= List of the oldest buildings in South Carolina =

This article attempts to list the oldest extant buildings surviving in the state of South Carolina in the United States of America, including the oldest houses in South Carolina and any other surviving structures. Some dates are approximate and based upon dendochronology, architectural studies, and historical records. Many sites on this list are considered American colonial architecture that date to the period before the American Revolutionary War. To be listed here a site must:

- date from prior to 1776; or
- be the oldest building in a town, city, or county; or
- be the oldest of its type (e.g., church or government building).

Building	Image	Location	Year built	Original use	Notes
Middleburg Plantation		Huger	1699	House	
Medway (Mount Holly, South Carolina)		Mount Holly	1704–1705	House	Main part of original house was actually built in 1686
Old St. Andrew's Parish Church		Charleston	1706	Church	Oldest church building in South Carolina
St. James Church (Goose Creek, South Carolina)		Goose Creek	1708	Church	
Col. William Rhett House		54 Hasell Street, Charleston	1712	House	
Pink House		17 Chalmers Street, Charleston	1712	House	
The Powder Magazine		79 Cumberland Street, Charleston	1713	The Powder Magazine of South Carolina	State's oldest public building. Daily visitation hours - www.PowderMag.org
Mulberry Plantation		U.S. 52, Moncks Corners	1714	House	
Hanover House		Clemson University, Anderson	1714	House	The house was relocated to Clemson University's campus when its original site in Berkeley County was inundated for the creation of Lake Moultrie in the 1940s.
John Lining House		106 Broad Street, Charleston	Before 1715	House	The house is now used as a law office.
Elizabeth O'Neill Verner House		38 Tradd Street, Charleston	1718	House	Often described together with adjacent 40 Tradd St. as the Bullock buildings.
Bullock Buildings – 40 Tradd Street		40 Tradd Street, Charleston	1718	House	Often described together with adjacent 38 Tradd St. as the Bullock buildings.
Nicholas Trott House		83 Cumberland Street, Charleston	1719	House	
John's Island Presbyterian Church		Johns Island, South Carolina	1719	Church	
William Bull House		35 Meeting Street, Charleston	1720	House	
Robert Brewton House		71 Church Street, Charleston	1721	House	
23 King Street		23 King Street, Charleston	1721–1755	House	The house has been divided in apartments.
Strawberry Chapel		Strawberry Chapel Road, near Cordesville	1725	Church	
Thomas Fleming House		65 Broad Street, Charleston	1725–1740	House	
Lamboll's Tenements		8-10 Tradd Street, Charleston	1726	House	
Christ Church		Mount Pleasant	1726	Church	
John Cowan House		50 King Street, Charleston	1729–1730	House	
Edgar Wells House		52 King Street, Charleston	1729–1730	House	
Fairfield Plantation		McClellanville	1730	House	
Fenwick Hall		Johns Island	1730	House	
Col. George Chicken House		49 Tradd Street, Charleston	1731	House	
Dr. William Cleland House		60 Tradd Street, Charleston	1732	House	
Dr. Peter Fayssoux House		126 Tradd Street, Charleston	1732	House	
Thomas Rose House		59 Church Street, Charleston	1733	House	
Thomas Dale House		73 Church Street, Charleston	1733	House	
Dr. Henry Frost Office		98 Broad Street, Charleston	1735	House	
Hampton Plantation		McClellanville	1735	House	The plantation is now operated as a state park.
Hopsewee		South of Georgetown	1735	House	
Hext Tenements		51-53 Tradd Street, Charleston	1736	House	
Allston-Read House		405 Front Street, Georgetown	1737	House	
William Elliott House		75 King Street, Charleston	Before 1739	House	
Thomas Lamboll House		19 King Street, Charleston	1739	House	A bed and breakfast operates out of the house.
Lucas Stearns House		719 Prince Street, Georgetown	1739	House	
Masonic Lodge		Georgetown	1740	Inn	
William Vanderhorst House		54 Tradd Street, Charleston	1740	House	
Clark Mills Studio		51–53 Broad Street, Charleston	1740	House	The building is now used as commercial space.
Benjamin Smith House		49 Broad Street, Charleston	1740	House	
George Ducat House		56 Tradd Street, Charleston	1740	House	
Alexander Gillon House		12 Gillon Street, South Carolina	1740	House	
Alexander Peronneau Tenements		141 Church Street, South Carolina	1740	House	Alexander Peronneau built both this single tenement house and the neighboring double tenement at 143-145 Church St. circa 1740.
Pirate House		143–145 Church Street, South Carolina	1740	House	Alexander Peronneau built both this double tenement house and the neighboring single tenement at 141 Church St. circa 1740.
George Sommers House		43 East Bay Street, Charleston	1740	House	
Isaac Holmes Tenement		107 Church Street, Charleston	1740	House	
Withers-Porter House		316 Screven Street, Georgetown	1740	House	
Hall-Sellars House		331 Screven Street, Georgetown	1740	House	
Anne Boone House		47 East Bay Street, Charleston	After 1740	House	
Othniel Beale Houses		97 and 99–101 East Bay Street, Charleston	After 1740	House	
Stiles-Hinson House		940 Paul Revere Drive, Charleston	1742	House	
Brunch-Hall House		36 Meeting Street, Charleston	1743	House	
George Eveleigh House		39 Church Street, Charleston	1743	House	
George Mathews House		37 Church Street, Charleston	1743	House	
John McCall House		19 Tradd Street, Charleston	1745	House	
Taylor-Haselden House		1032 Front Street, Georgetown	1745	House	
Brewton's Corner Dependencies		35 Tradd Street, South Carolina	Before 1747	House	
John Prue House		41 King Street, Charleston	1746	House	
Jonathan Badger Tenements		41–43 Tradd Street, Charleston	1746–1772	House	
John Drayton House		2 Ladson Street, Charleston	After 1746	House	
Capt. Francis Baker House		79 King Street, Charleston	1747–1749	House	
Drayton Hall		near Charleston	1747–1752	House	Drayton Hall is now open to the public as a museum house.
Thorntree		Kingstree	1749	House	
Cabbage Row		83–85 Church Street, Charleston	1749–1750	House	
David Ramsay House		92 Broad Street, Charleston	Before 1750	House	The house is used as a law office.
Capers-Motte House		69 Church Street, Charleston	1750	House	
Stewart-Congdon-Farrelly House		513 Prince Street, Georgetown	1750	House	
Ward-Bull House		614 Prince Street, Georgetown	1750	House	
Oakland Plantation		Mount Pleasant	1750	House	
Beneventum Plantation House		Georgetown	1750	House	
Daniel Cannon Tenement		45 Queen Street, Charleston	1750	House	
Prince George Winyah Parish Church		Broad and Highmarket Streets, Georgetown	1750	Church	
Grimke-Fraser House		102 Tradd Street, Charleston	Mid-18th century	House	
Reardon House		Kingstree	1750–1770	House	
Fleming-Jenkinson House		Academy Street, Kingstree	1750–1775	House	
St. Michael's Episcopal Church		80 Broad Street, Charleston	1751–1761	Church	
James Veree Houses		58 Church Street, Charleston	1754	House	James Veree built this house in 1754 and the neighboring house at 60 Church St. a decade later.
Middleton Place		Summerville	1755	House	The remaining structure was originally a guest house for a no-longer-standing plantation house. Middleton Place is open to the public for tours of its house and gardens.
Ralph Izard House		110 Broad Street, Charleston	Before September 1757	House	
Mansion House Hotel Annex		67–69 Broad Street, Charleston	1758–1765	House	
Ann Bocquet House		104 Broad Street, Charleston	After 1758	House	
Charles Elliott House		43 Legare Street, Charleston	1759	House	
Justinus Stoll House		7 Stoll's Alley, Charleston	1759	House	
Peter Leger House		90 Church Street, Charleston	1759–1760	House	
Edward Rutledge House		117 Broad Street, Charleston	1760	House	The house is used as a bed and breakfast.
Cleland-Wells House		58 Tradd Street, Charleston	1760	House	
James Simmons House		37 Meeting Street, Charleston	1760	House	
William Cooper House		Indiantown	1760	House	
Samuel Wainwright House		94 Tradd Street, Charleston	1760	House	
Thomas Hepworth House		214 New Street, Beaufort	1760	House	Possibly the oldest house in Beaufort, South Carolina. Could have been built as early as 1720.
Joseph H. Rainey House		909 Prince Street, Georgetown	1760	House	
Bolen-Bellune House		222 Broad Street, Georgetown	1760	House	
Harold Kaminski House		1003 Front Street, Georgetown	1760	House	
Pawley-Parker House		1019 Front Street, Georgetown	1760	House	
Humley-Miller House		331 Screven Street, Georgetown	1760	House	
Daniel Elliott Huger House		34 Meeting Street, Charleston	1760	House	
Pacey House		601 Highmarket Street, Georgetown	1760	House	
Daniel Legare House		79 Anson Street, Charleston	1760	House	
25 Meeting Street		25 Meeting Street, Charleston	1760	House	
Tucker-Smith-Tarbox House		15 Cannon Street, Georgetown	1760	House	
Cooper-Bee House		94 Church Street, South Carolina	1760–1765	House	
Thomas Elfe House		54 Queen Street, South Carolina	1760–1770	House	
Edward Blake House		1 Legare Street, Charleston	1760–1770	House	
Blake Tenements		2–4 Courthouse Square, Charleston	1760–1772	Rental townhouses	The houses are used as offices for Charleston County.
Grimke-Fraser Tenements		55 King Street, Charleston	1762	House	
Dewar-Lee-Pringle House		92 Tradd Street, Charleston	1762	House	
John Rutledge House		116 Broad Street, Charleston	1763	House	The house is used as a bed-and-breakfast.
Pompion Hill Chapel		Huger	1763	Church	
Charles Elliott House		22 Legare Street, Charleston	1764	House	
James Veree Houses		60 Church Street, Charleston	1764	House	James Veree built this house in 1764 and the neighboring house at 58 Church St. a decade earlier.
Guillebeau House		Willington	1764	House	
Fotheringham-McNeil Tenements		72 Tradd Street, Charleston	Before 1765	House	
Humphrey Sommers House		128 Tradd Street, Charleston	1765	House	
Walnut Grove Plantation		Roebuck	1765	House	
Branford-Horry House		59 Meeting Street, Charleston	Before 1767	House	
Old St. Michael's Rectory		39 Meeting Street, Charleston	1767	House	
McCrady's Tavern and Long Room		153 East Bay Street, Charleston	1767	House	A restaurant by the same name operates in the building.
St. Stephens Episcopal Church		St. Stephen	1767–1769	Church	
Exchange and Provost		122 East Bay Street, Charleston	1767-177	Royal custom house	The building is open as a museum.
William Washington House		8 South Battery, Charleston	1768	House	
Elizabeth Petrie House		3 Orange Street, Charleston	1768	House	
St. James Episcopal Church		McClellanville	1768	Church	
Miles Brewton House		27 King Street, Charleston	1769	House	
Charles Pinckney House		7 Orange Street, Charleston	1769	House	
Young-Keenan House		14 Water Street, Charleston	1769	House	
John Rose House		43 Church Street, Charleston	1769–1775	House	
Rev. Robert Smith House		6 Glebe Street, Charleston	1770	House	Residence of the president of the College of Charleston
Peter Bocquet, Jr. House		95 Broad Street, Charleston	1770	House	
McGrath House		220 Queen Street, Georgetown	1770	House	
Humley-Miller House		1024 Front Street, Georgetown	1770	House	
Fraser House		1028 Front Street, Georgetown	1770	House	
Simons Tenements		9–11 Orange Street, Charleston	1770	House	
Greenwich Plantation		320 St. James Street, Georgetown	1773	House	All of the original building that remains is the detached kitchen, later converted into an art studio and then house.
Young-Motte House		30 Meeting Street, Charleston	1770	House	
Albert Detmar House		23 Meeting Street, Charleston	1770	House	
Withers-Kaminski House		622 Highmarket Street, Georgetown	1770	House	
John Edwards House		15 Meeting Street, Charleston	1770	House	
Young-Johnson House		35 Church Street, Charleston	1770	House	
William Harvey House		58 Meeting Street, Charleston	1770	House	
James Vanderhorst House		46–48 Tradd Street, Charleston	1770	House	
Elliott House		Richburg	1770 c.	House	
Pegues Place		Wallace	1770 c.	House	
Laurance Corley House		231 Fox Street, Lexington	1771	House	Now located on the grounds of the Lexington County Museum. The oldest structure in the town of Lexington.
John Scott House		38 Coming Street, Charleston	1771	House	
Geiger House		54 Broad Street, Charleston	1771–1775	House	
Heyward-Washington House		87 Church Street, Charleston	1772	House	The house is open to the public as a museum operated by the Charleston Museum.
Colonel John Stuart House		104–106 Tradd Street, Charleston	1772	House	
John Fullerton House		15 Legare Street, Charleston	1772	House	
Unitarian Church		4 Archdale Street, Charleston	1772–1787	Church	
William Gibbes House		64 South Battery, Charleston	1772–1788	House	
Philip Porcher House		19 Archdale Street, Charleston	1773	House	
Lewisfield Plantation		Moncks Corner	1774	House	
Robert Pringle House		70 Tradd Street, Charleston	1774	House	
Robert Hayne House		30 King Street, Charleston	Before 1775	House	
Kincaid-Anderson House		Jenkinsville	1774	House	
Man-Doyle House		528 Front Street, Georgetown	1775	House	
Bonham House		Saluda, SC	1780	House	
Blocker House		Route 25, near Edgefield	1790 c.	House	
Seibels House		Columbia	1796	House	Oldest house in the state capital
Elizabeth Hext House		207 Hancock Street, Beaufort	1800	House	One of the earliest surviving houses using tabby concrete. Dated with dendochronology.
Congregation Kahal Kadosh Beth Elohim		Charleston	1840	Synagogue	Oldest Jewish synagogue in South Carolina

== See also ==
- Oldest buildings in the United States
- Oldest churches in the United States
- National Register of Historic Places listings in South Carolina
