= Isaac Holmes =

Isaac Holmes may refer to:

- Isaac Holmes (lieutenant governor) (1758–1812), lieutenant governor of South Carolina
- Isaac E. Holmes (1796–1867), U.S. representative from South Carolina

== See also ==
- Isaac Holmes Tenement, a pre-Revolutionary house in Charleston, South Carolina
