= Porcher (disambiguation) =

Porcher is surname of French origin.

Porcher may also refer to:

== Places ==
- Porcher House, a historic home in Cocoa, Florida
- Philip Porcher House, a historic home outside the city limits of Charleston, South Carolina
- Porcher Island, an island in the Hecate Strait, British Columbia, Canada
- Porchères, a commune in the Gironde département in Aquitaine in south-western France
- Porcheville, a village and commune in the Yvelines département of northern France
- Villeporcher, a commune in the Loir-et-Cher département of central France
- Saint-Porquier, a town and commune in the Tarn-et-Garonne département of France, in the Midi-Pyrénées region

== Ships ==
- Porcher was a merchant vessel that made one voyage for the British East India Company (EIC), was captured and recaptured, became Cambridge, then making several more voyages for the EIC. Eventually the Qing Dynasty purchased her for the Imperial Chinese Navy. The British Royal Navy destroyed her during the Battle of First Bar at the onset of the First Opium War.
- Henry Porcher was a merchant vessel that made three voyages to India for the British East India Company (EIC). On the second she first transported convicts to Sydney, New South Wales, Australia. Between these voyages for the EIC, Henry Porcher traded privately to India as a licensed ship. She made two further voyages as a convict transport, one to Sydney in 1834–35, and one to Hobart in 1836. She grounded in 1858 and was broken up in 1860.

== Businesses ==
- Porcher (brand), a brand of plumbing fixtures sold by Ideal Standard
