= George Mathews House =

Coordinates: 32°46′21.91″N 79°55′46.63″W

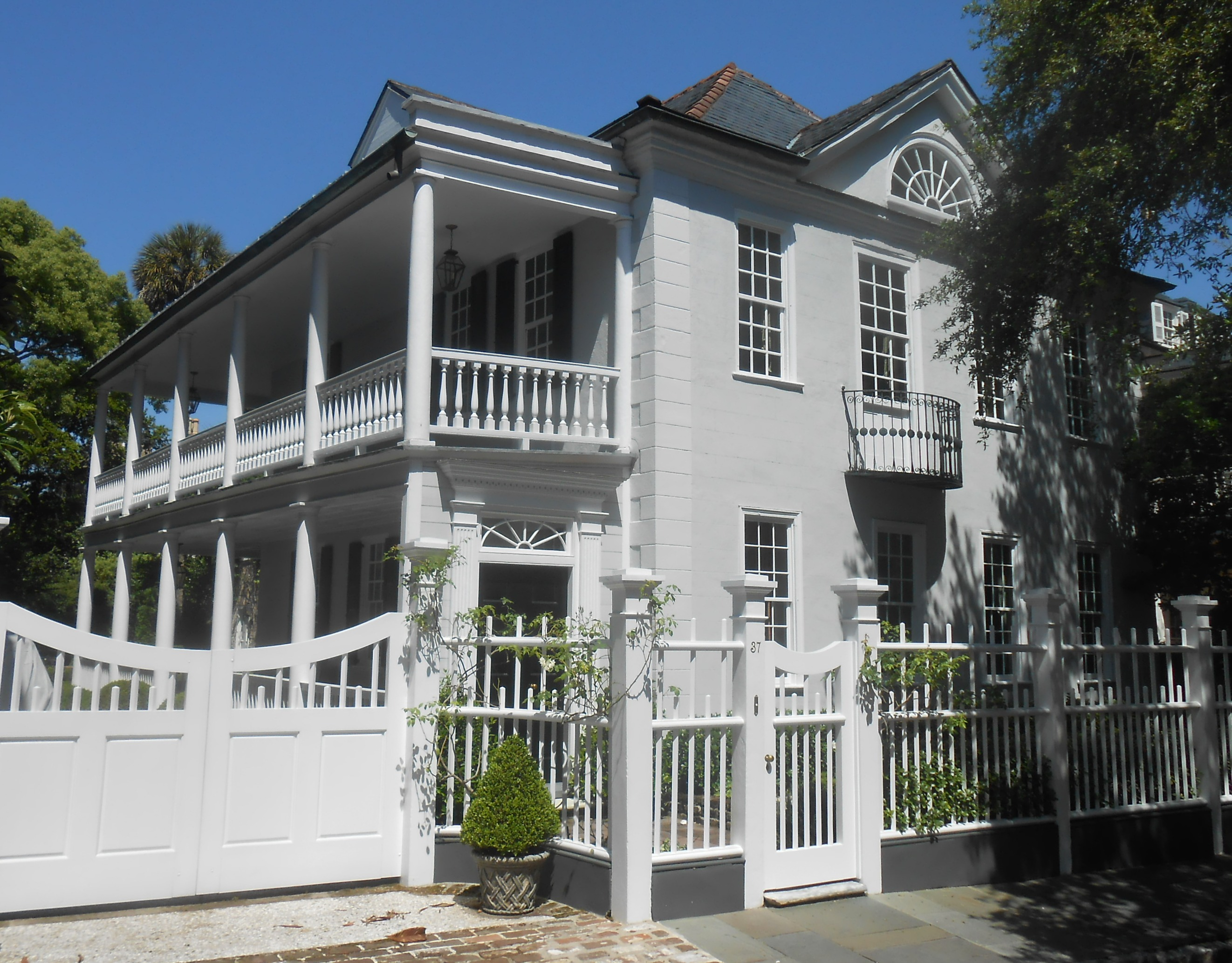
The George Mathews House at 37 Church Street, Charleston, South Carolina

The George Mathews House is an 18th-century house located at 37 Church Street, Charleston, South Carolina. George Mathews had purchased the lot in 1743; by 1768, when the executors of his estate sold the property, the sales price (and construction details of the house) strongly suggest that Mathews had the house built during his ownership. The floor plan of the house is an asymmetrical variation of a Charleston double house that is similar to (but a mirror image of) the nearby George Eveleigh House. The entrance to the house was moved from its Church Street facade to the southern facade when the piazzas were added. A separate kitchen house exists in the rear.

A popular story of Charleston folklore tells that the house was once home to John Vanderhorst, a sea captain who kept his money safe by hiding it in plain sight in a water barrel on the front of the house. The story, however, cannot possibly be true since Captain Vanderhorst died before the house was even built.
