= John's Island Presbyterian Church =

Historic church in South Carolina, United States

- U.S. National Register of Historic Places
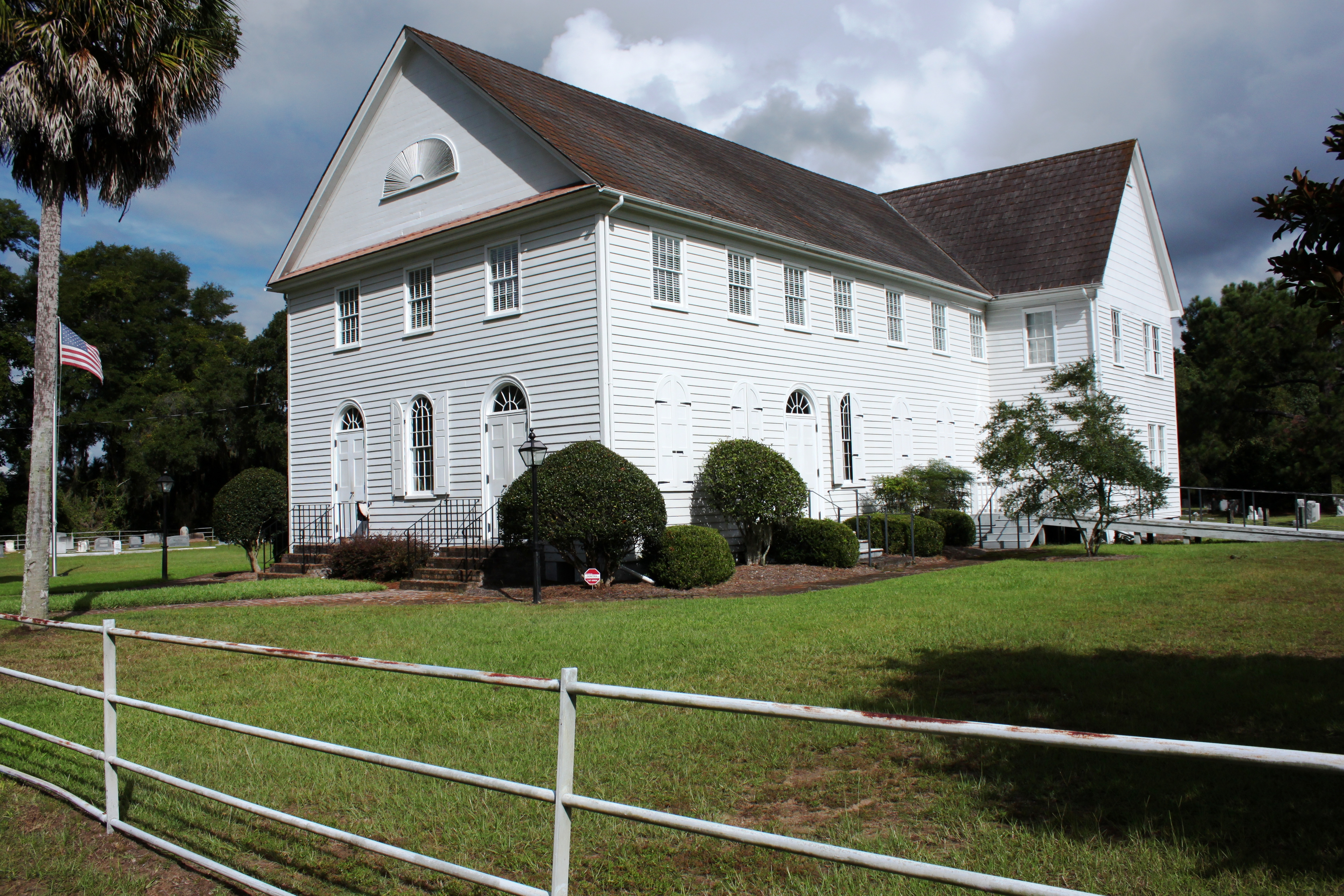

- Location within South Carolina Location within the United States
- Location: 10 miles west of Charleston on South Carolina Highway 20, Johns Island, South Carolina
- Coordinates: 32°41′12″N 80°4′56″W
- Area: 6 acres (2.4 ha)
- Built: 1719
- Architectural style: Colonial, "Meeting house" style
- NRHP reference No.: 75001692
- Added to NRHP: November 03, 1975

John's Island Presbyterian Church is a historic Presbyterian church located on Johns Island, Charleston County, South Carolina. It was founded in 1719 by Rev Archibald Stobo, a Church of Scotland minister. It was remodeled in 1792 and extended in 1823. It is a T-shaped, frame meeting house-style church sheathed in clapboard.

It was added to the National Register of Historic Places in 1975.

== Gallery ==
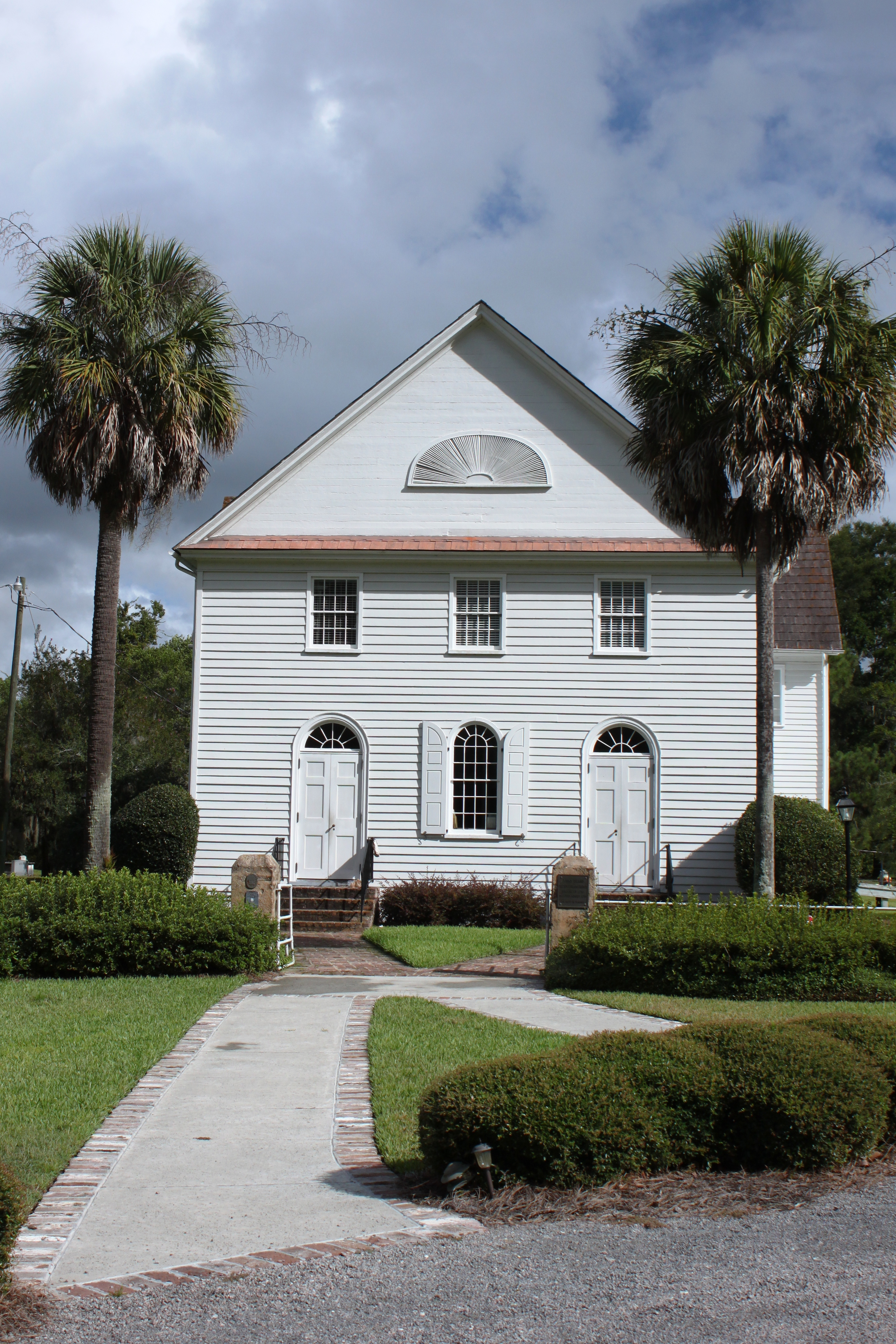
Front Door

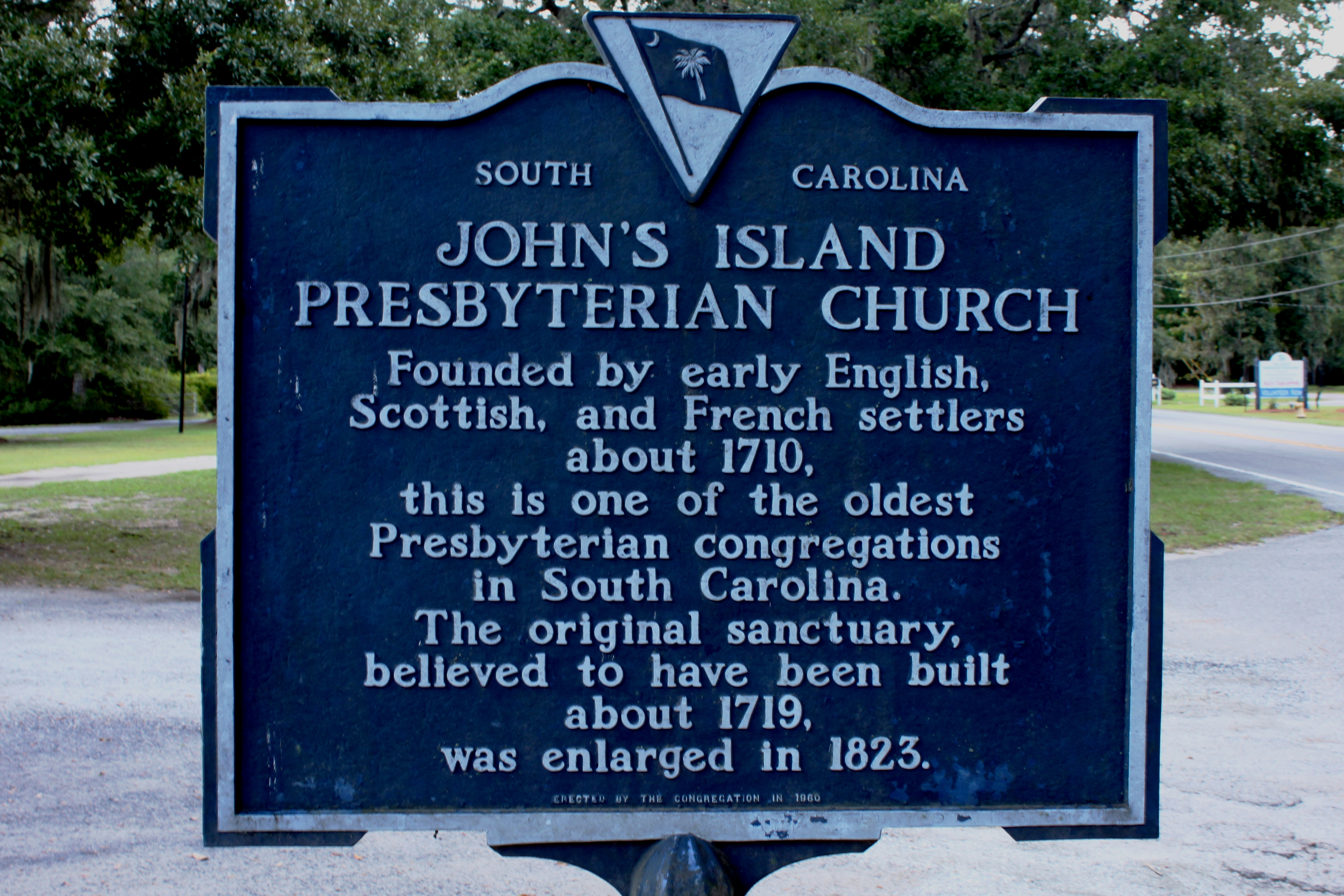
Historical Marker

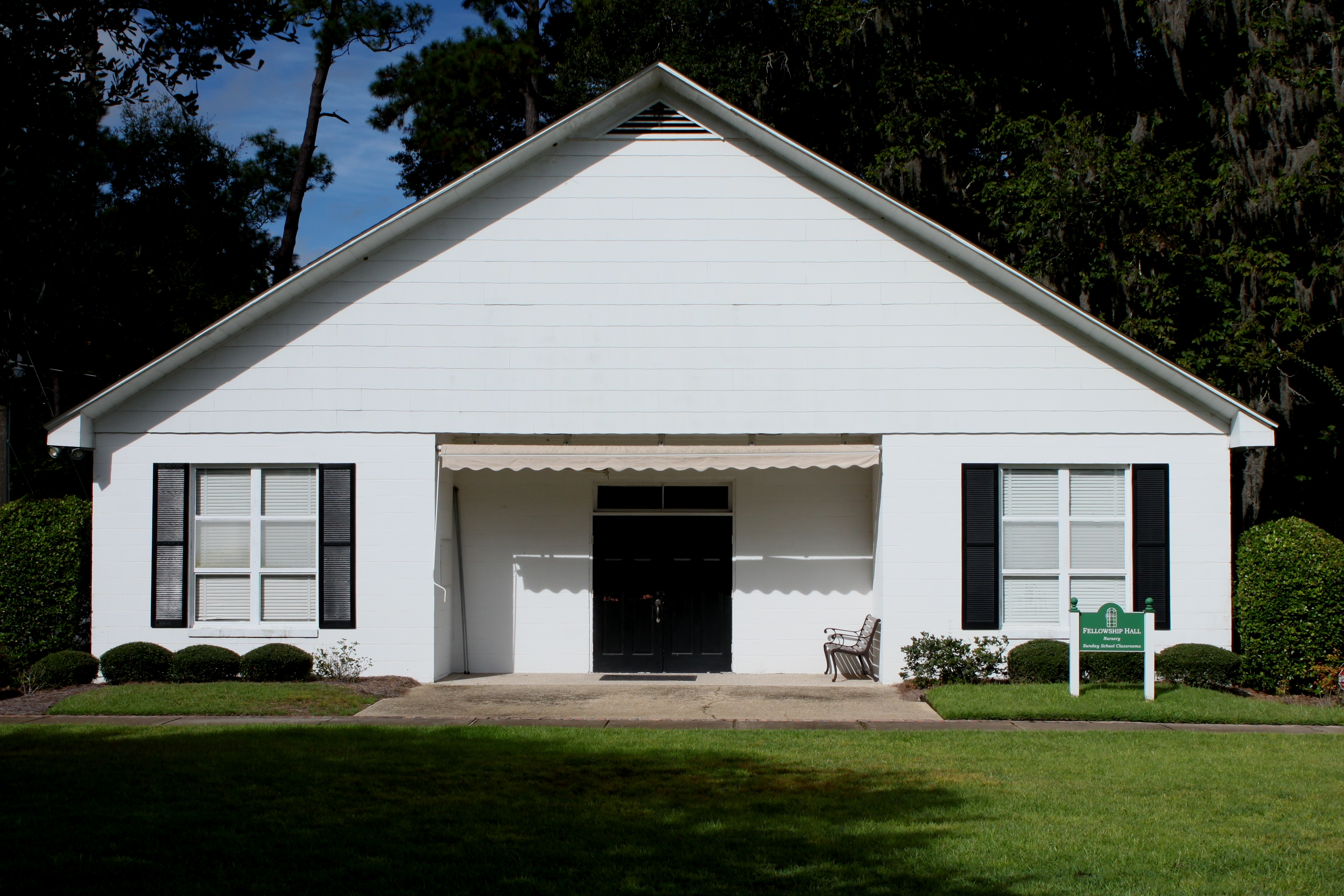
Fellowship Hall

== See also ==
- List of the oldest buildings in South Carolina
