= Isaac Holmes Tenement =

Coordinates: 32.776317°N 79.929344°W

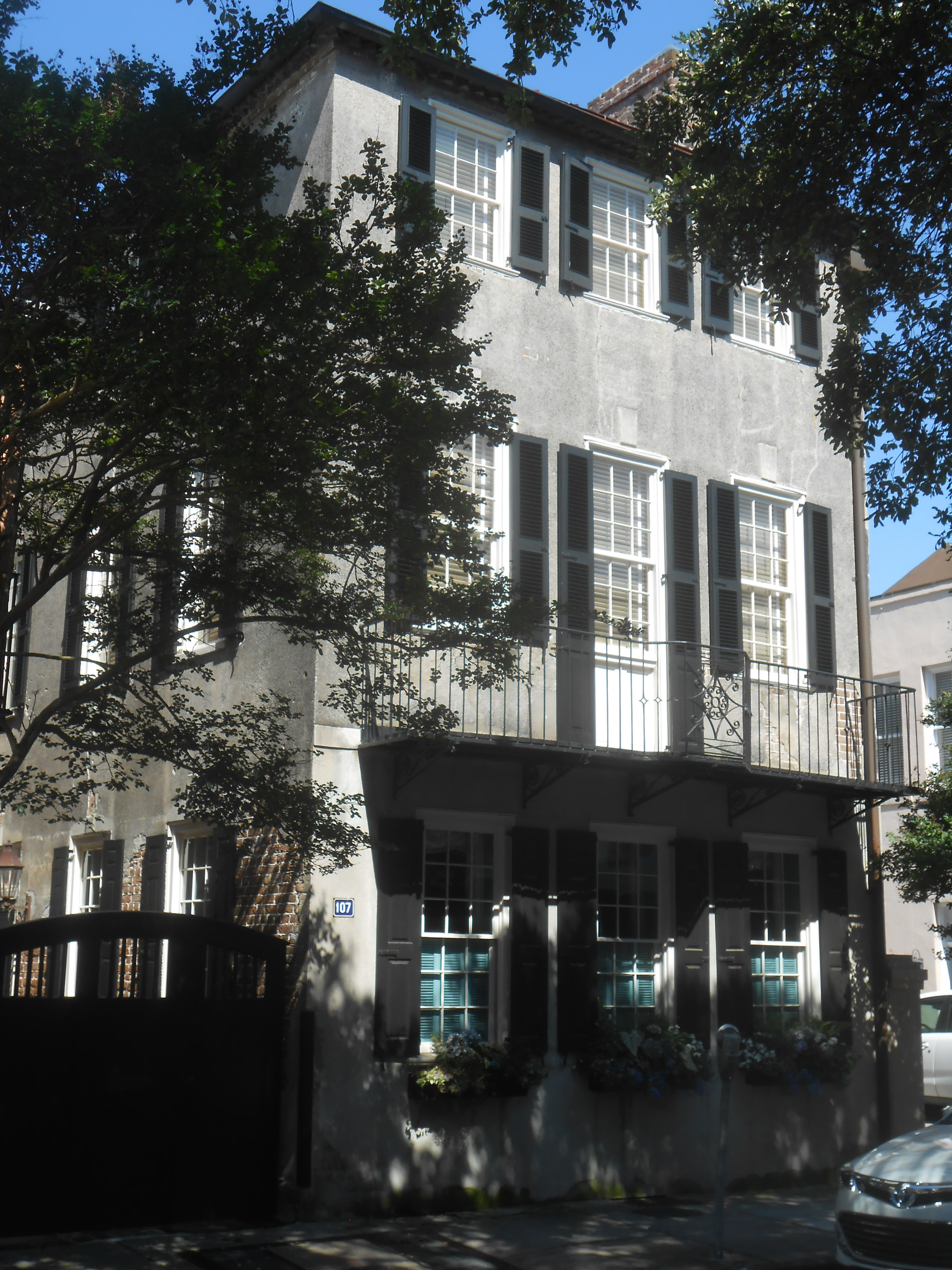
The Isaac Holmes Tenement is at 107 Church Street, Charleston, South Carolina.

The Isaac Holmes Tenement is a pre-Revolutionary house in Charleston, South Carolina. In 1721, Isaac Holmes acquired the parcel upon which 107 Church Street was built. It appears that he built a house on the land, but whatever structure he had built was lost in a fire in 1740 that wiped out many buildings in the area.

The current house was likely built soon after that fire. The house has Georgian interiors similar to those found in the George Eveleigh House and Thomas Rose House.

When Isaac Holmes prepared his will in 1754, the house was being occupied by a family of no apparent relation to Isaac Holmes.
