= Humphrey Sommers House =

Coordinates: 32.774404°N 79.935211°W

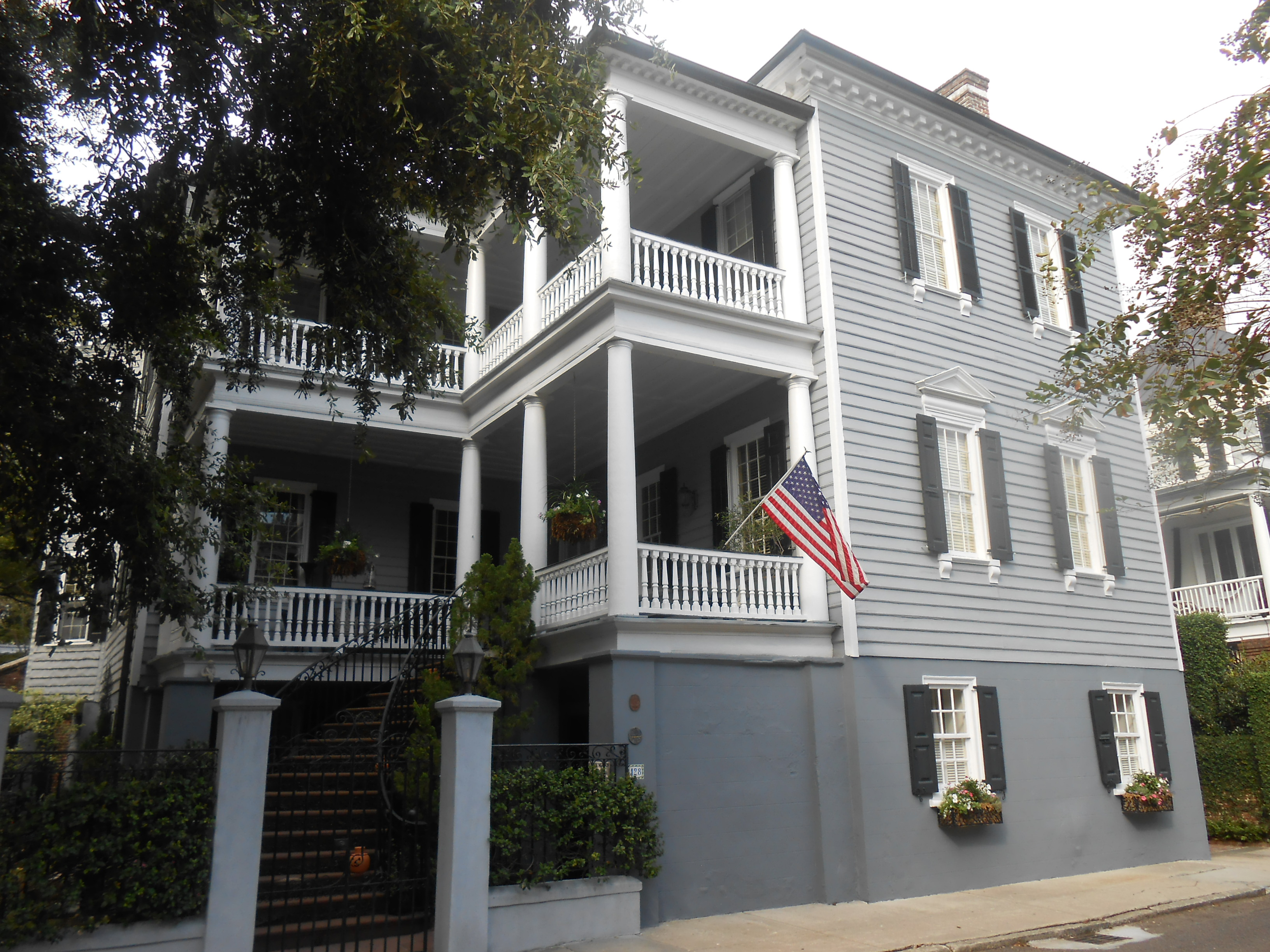
The Humphrey Sommers Houses is at 128 Tradd Street in Charleston, South Carolina.

The Humphrey Sommers House is a pre-Revolutionary house in Charleston, South Carolina. Humphrey Sommers, who worked as the main contractor for St. Michael's Episcopal Church, is said to have built the house while working on the church; if so, the house can be dated to 1753 to 1762. The house began as a traditional Charleston single house, and it was entered through the ground floor. The L-shape of the house, formed by an addition at the northwest corner of the house, was in place by 1788 when the house can be seen on a map of the city. Still later, broad piazzas were added to the west side of the house, and the main entrance was relocated to the second floor of the house atop a curving staircase to the second level of the piazzas. The piazzas were not present when the house was sold in 1830 to the widow of United States Representative William Lowndes.
