= William Bull House =

Coordinates: 32.772961°N 79.930719°W

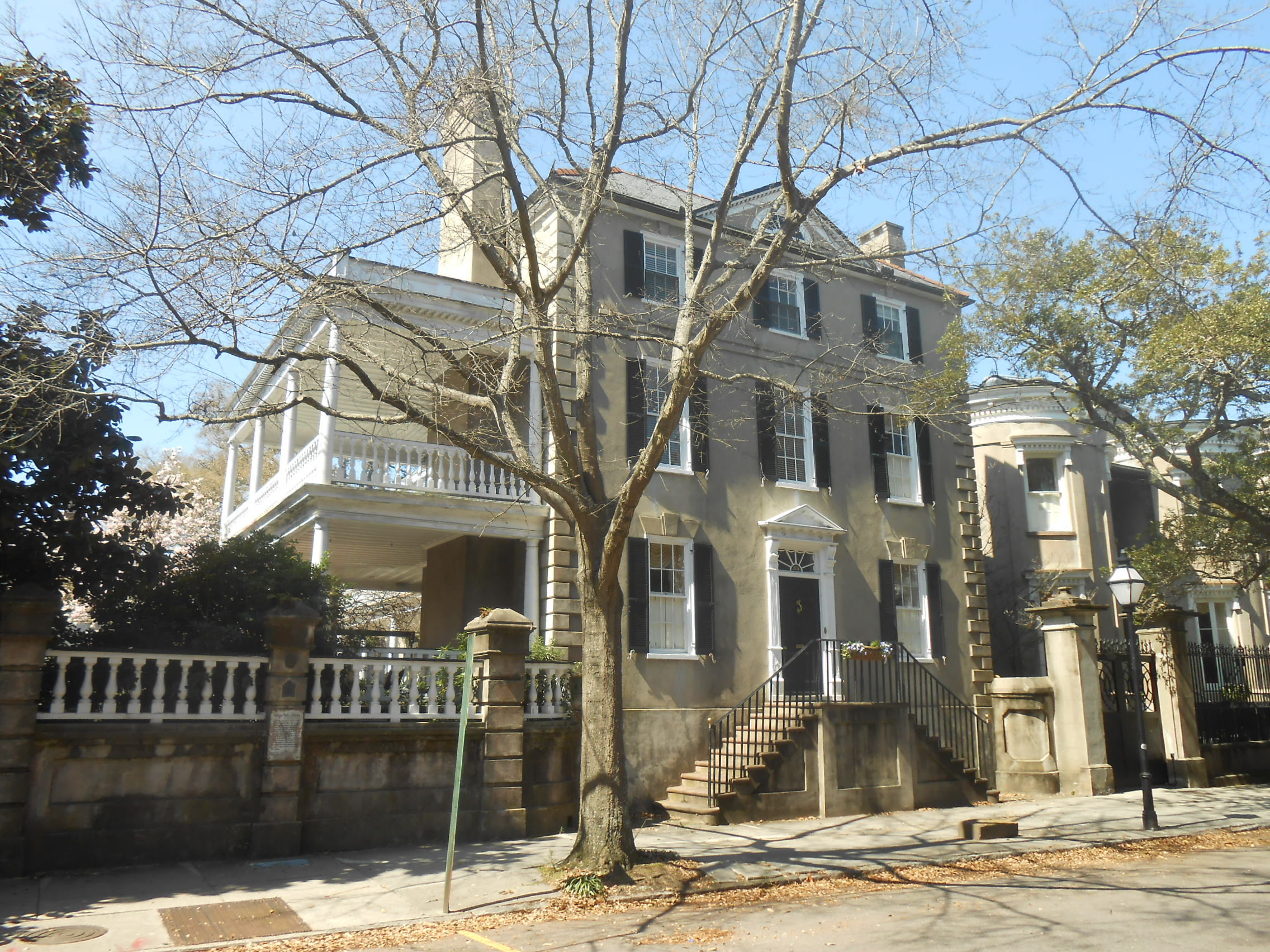
The William Bull House is at 35 Meeting Street, Charleston, South Carolina.

The William Bull House is built on property acquired by Stephen Bull in 1694. The piazzas on the south side are a later addition.

The house was built about 1720 by Lt. Gov. William Bull, the first lieutenant governor of the royal colony of South Carolina, and was later home to his son, William Bull II, who also served as lieutenant governor. The three-and-one-half story brick house sits on a high foundation.
