= David Ramsay House =

Coordinates: 32.776620°N 79.931892°W

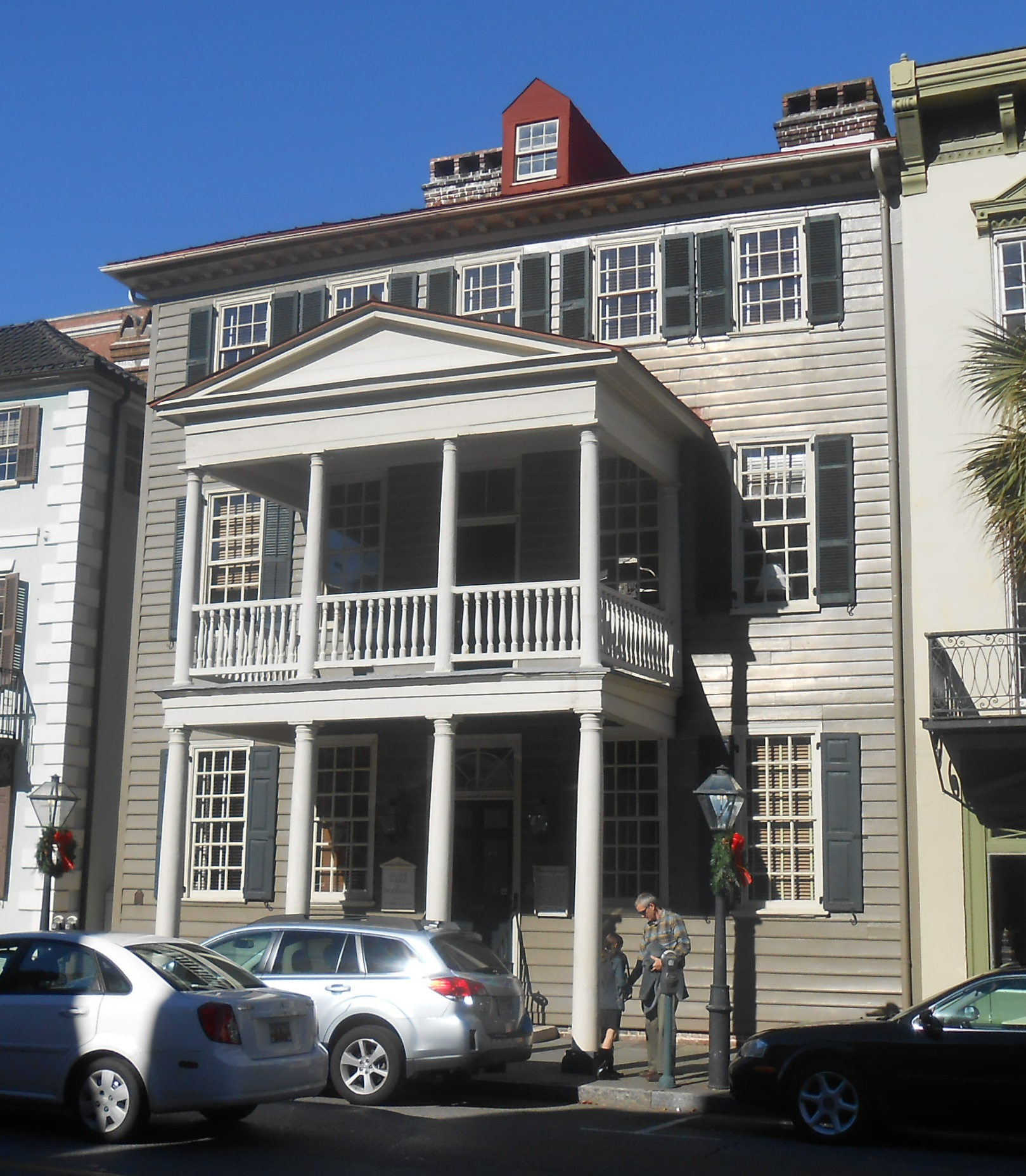
The David Ramsay House is at 92 Broad Street in Charleston, South Carolina.

The David Ramsay House is an historic home in Charleston, South Carolina. It was built before 1740.

Dr. David Ramsay (historian) arrived in Charleston in 1773 after graduating from the University of Pennsylvania and made his home at 92 Broad Street soon after. He practiced as a doctor; he was the first person to introduce a smallpox vaccine into Charleston. But he is better known for his political service. Dr. Ramsay also served in the Continental Congress from 1782 to 1786 and in the South Carolina House of Representatives from 1776 to 1783. Later, from 1801 to 1815, he was a state senator.

The Georgian woodwork in the house, especially in the main parlor on the first floor, is particularly fine. It has been described by architects as "the most perfect example of Georgian paneling in America." In 1934, the house was recorded by the CWA.
