= Nicholas Trott House =

1719 American house

Coordinates: 32.779437°N 79.930178°W

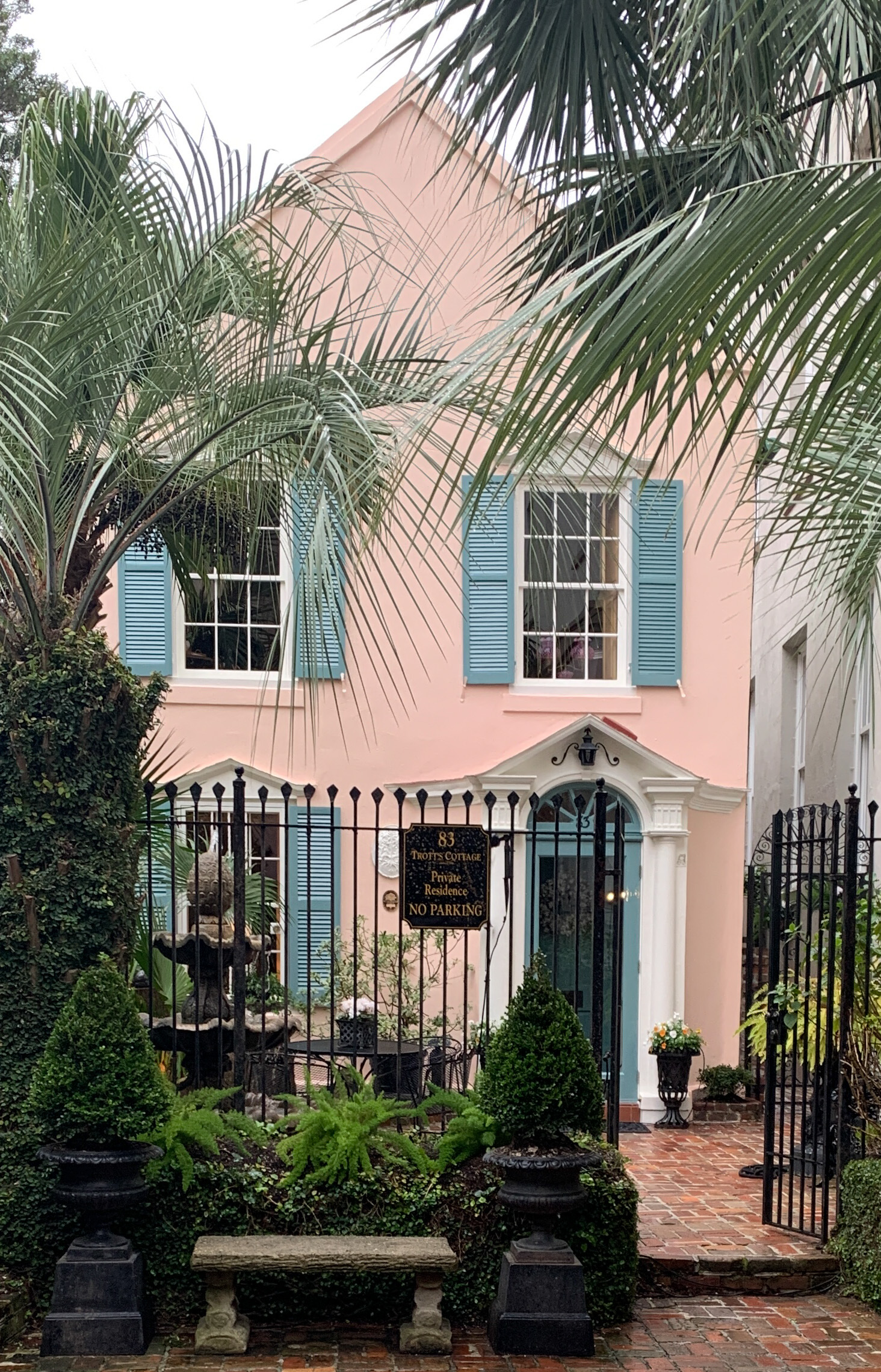
Nicholas Trott House

The Nicholas Trott House was built of English brick by 1719. The two-story brick building at 83 Cumberland Street is said to be the oldest brick house in Charleston, South Carolina.

The house is named for its first owner, Nicholas Trott, who arrived in Charleston from Bermuda where his cousin (also named Nicholas Trott) served as governor. Trott was the first attorney general for the Carolina province and served as the chief justice from 1713 to 1719. Among the trials he presided over was the trial of Stede Bonnet, a notorious pirate.
