= William Vanderhorst House =

Coordinates: 32.775013°N 79.929961°W

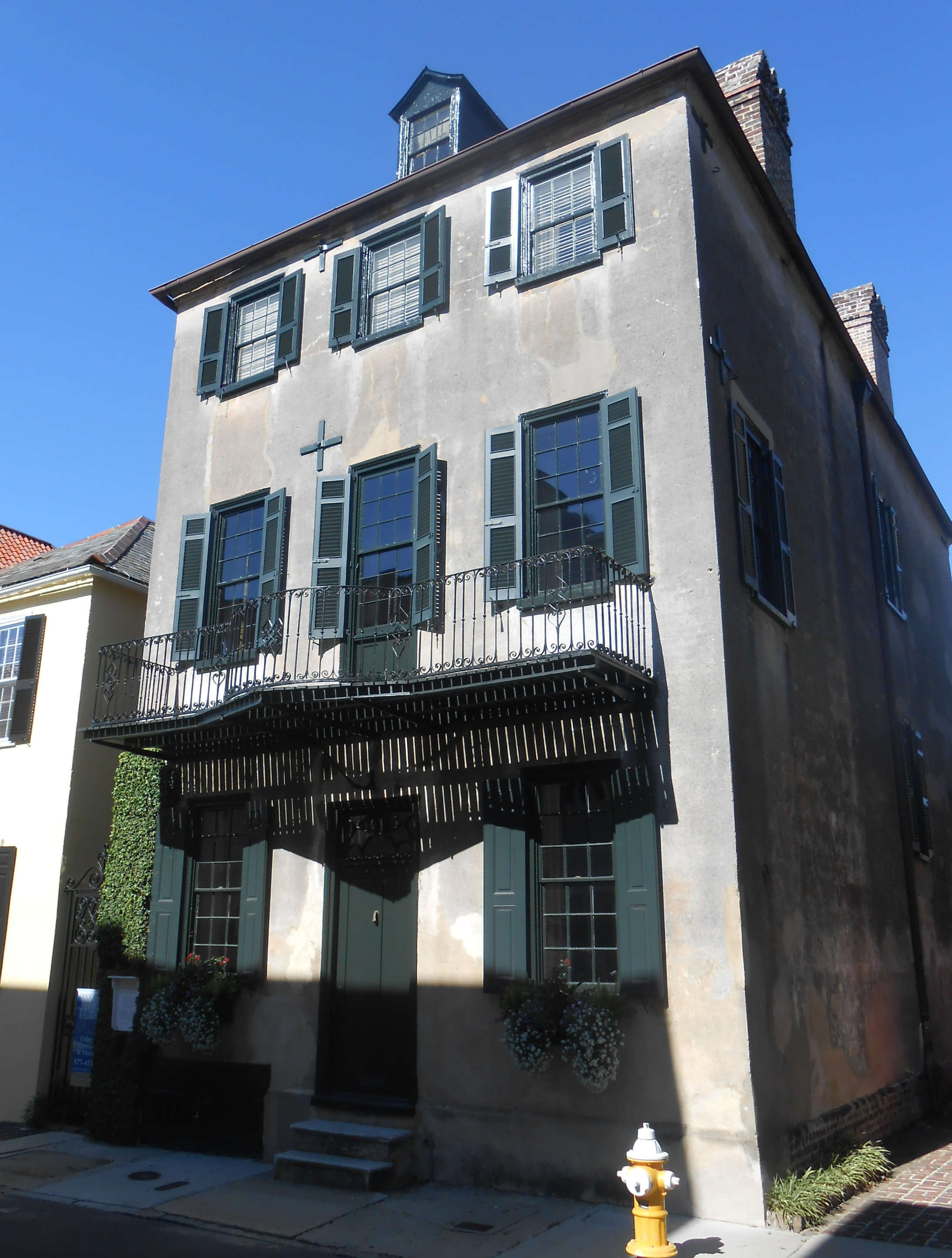
The William Vanderhorst House is at 54 Tradd Street, Charleston, South Carolina.

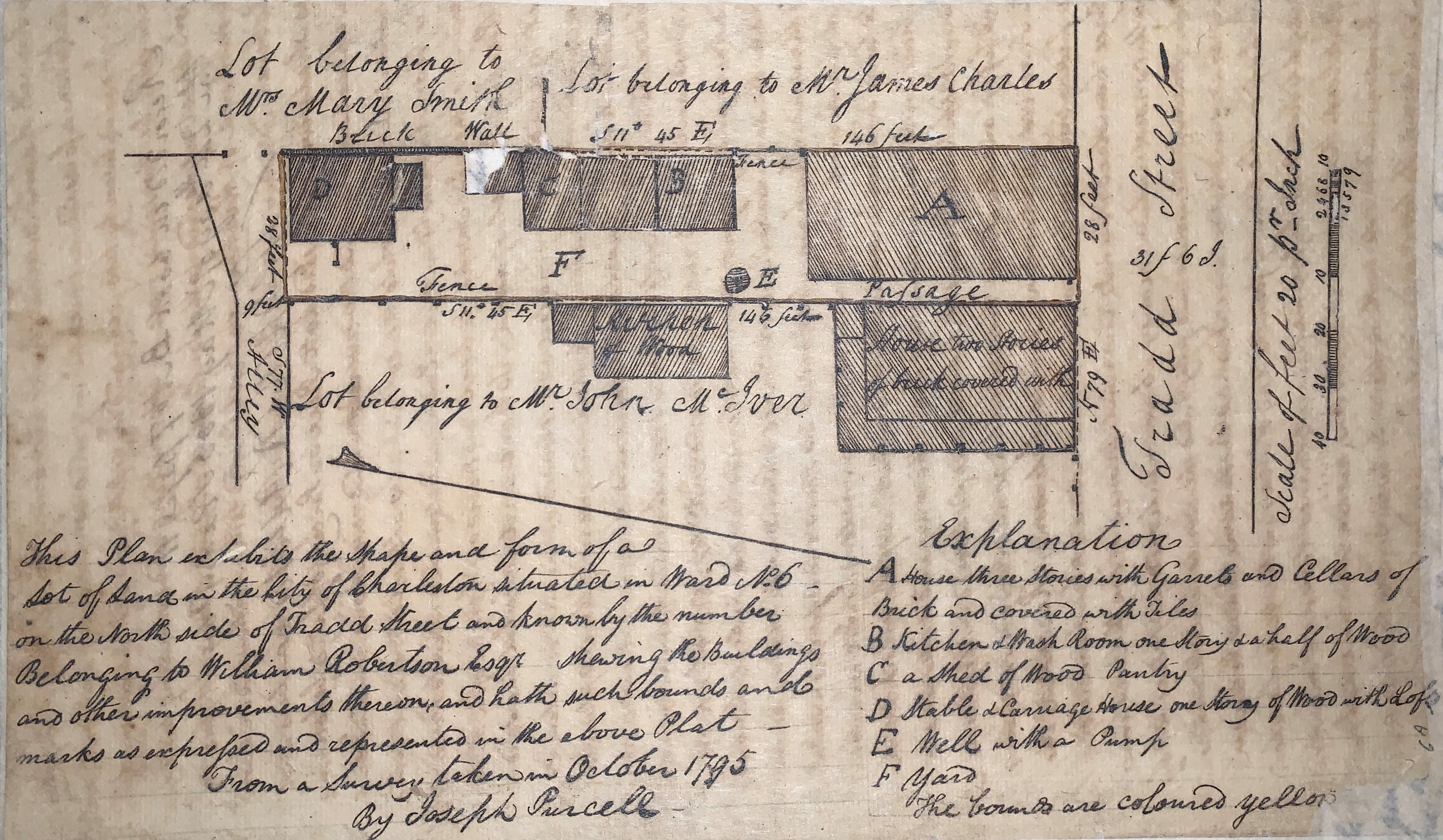
The William Vanderhorst House was shown in a plat drawn in 1795 and marked with an A.

The William Vanderhorst House was used as the first post office in Charleston, South Carolina before 1753. Eleazer Philips was the first postmaster of Charleston to have a dedicated office for the handling of the mail, and he used 54 Tradd Street for that purpose. Earlier postmasters handled the mail in their own houses. The house was used as a post office until after 1791 when Peter Bacot relocated the operation to 84 Broad Street.

The house was built by William Vanderhorst about 1740 on property inherited by his wife from her grandfather.

(as of 2025) It is still privately owned.
