= Samuel Wainwright House =

Coordinates: 32.77460°N 79.93239°W

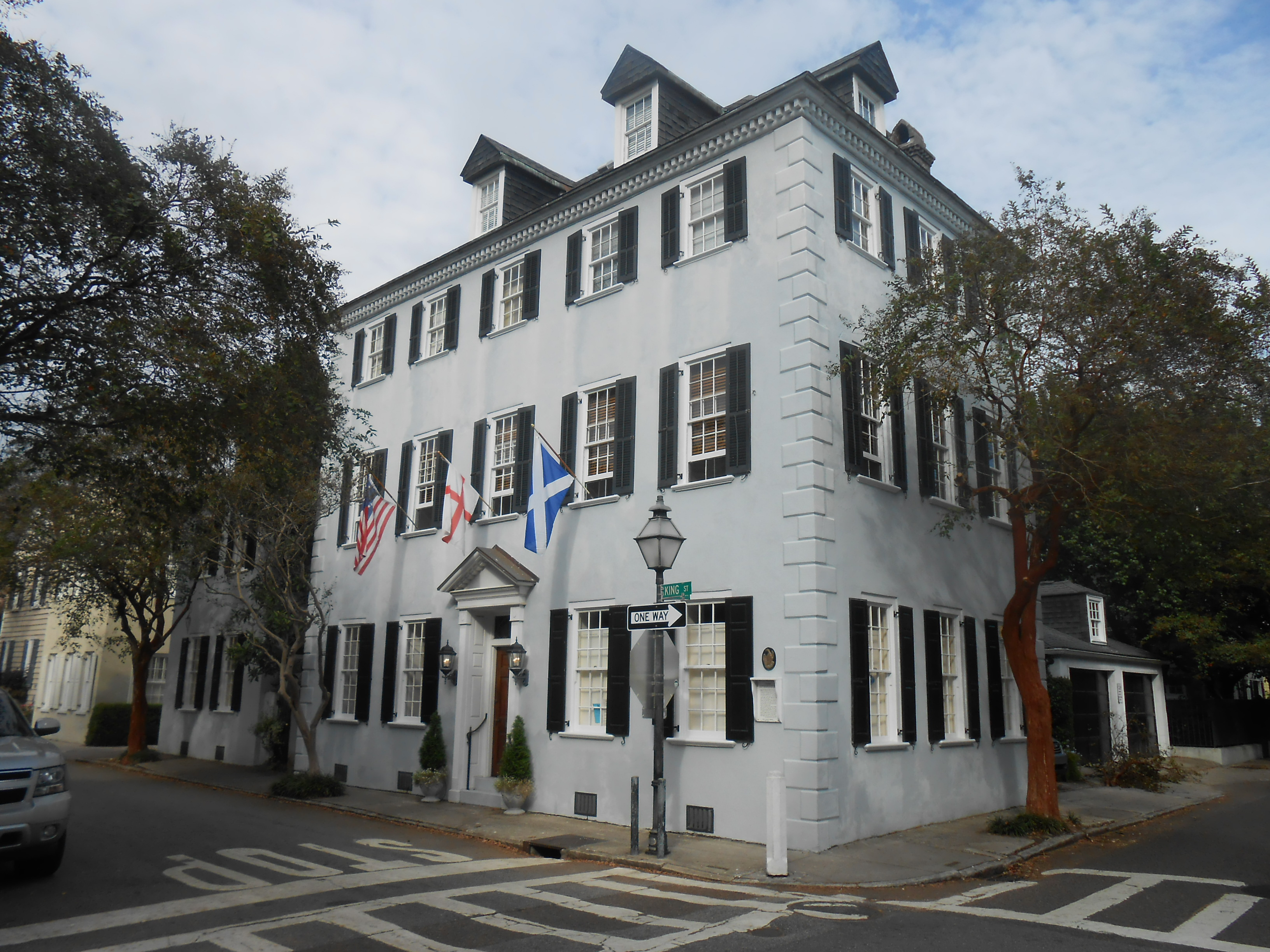
The Samuel Wainwright House was the studio of Samuel Morse for a few years.

The Samuel Wainwright House is a 3 1/2-story, pre-Revolutionary, Georgian Charleston single house at 94 Tradd St., Charleston, South Carolina. The house has tall windows on the first two floors with smaller windows on the third and dormers on the roof. The house has quoined corners and a modillioned cornice.

Samuel Wainwright arrived in South Carolina in the 1740s and rose quickly to become a wealthy planter and serve in the state legislature. Around 1760, he built his imposing house at 94 Tradd St. at the northeast corner of King St. He died in 1780 without children, and the house passed to other members of the Wainwright and Bacot families.

For much of the house's history, it has been used as both a residential and commercial property including periods as a bakery and grocery. The Tradd Street Pharmacy was the final commercial tenant, leaving in 1970. Residential tenants included Samuel Morse, who painted a portrait of Mrs. Daniel DeSaussure Bacot in his second-floor studio which hangs in the Metropolitan Museum of Art.

In the 1955, the house was bought by Mrs. James M. Wilson who undertook the restoration of the house as a single family house in the 1970s following the issuance of building code citations over the condition of the house. The work included removing an exterior staircase to the second floor from the east side.
