= Blake Tenements =

Historic residential buildings in South Carolina, United States

- U.S. National Register of Historic Places
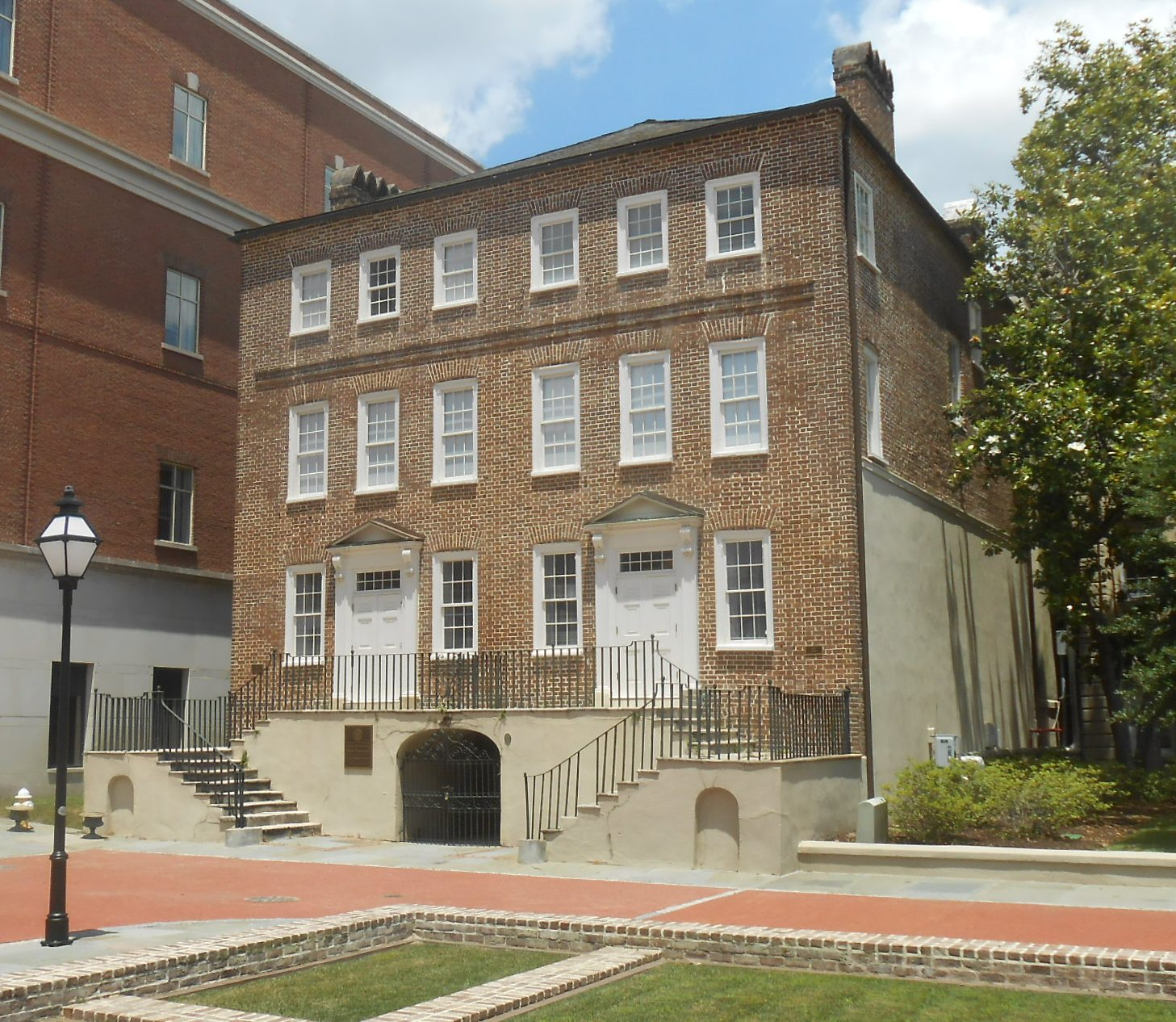

- Location within South Carolina Location within the United States
- Location: 2--4 Courthouse Sq., Charleston, South Carolina
- Coordinates: 32°46′36″N 79°55′55″W
- Built: 1760
- NRHP reference No.: 70000572
- Added to NRHP: August 25, 1970

The Blake Tenements were built between 1760 and 1772 by Daniel Blake, a planter from Newington Plantation on the Ashley River. The building was named to the National Register of Historic Places in 1970. The building was renovated for use as an annex to a nearby county office building in 1969.

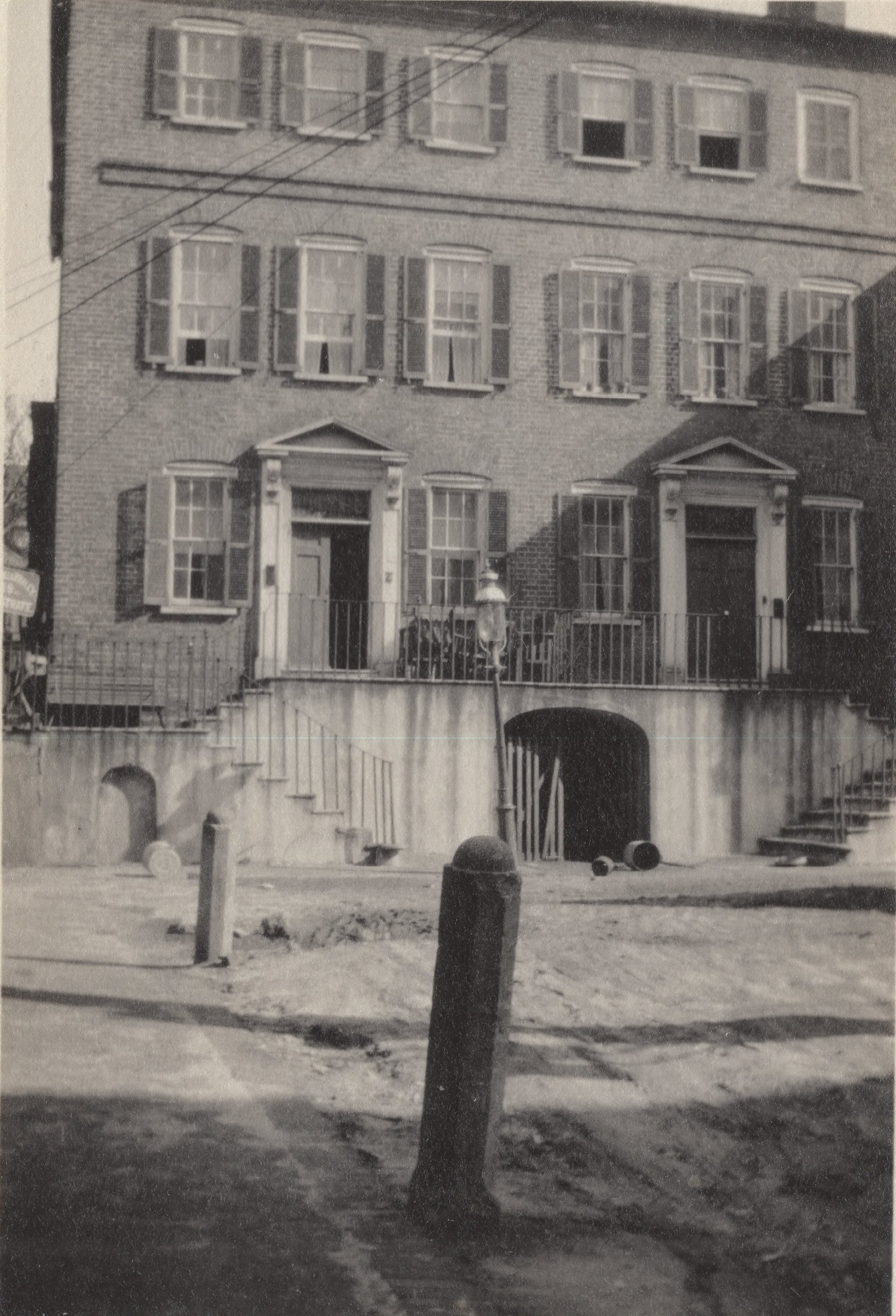
The Blake Tenements were photographed in 1925.

== Architecture ==
The double tenement is three and one-half stories of brick on a high brick basement. The brickwork is laid in Flemish bond on the facade with English bond on the sides. The building was acquired by Charleston County in 1967 and used for county offices.

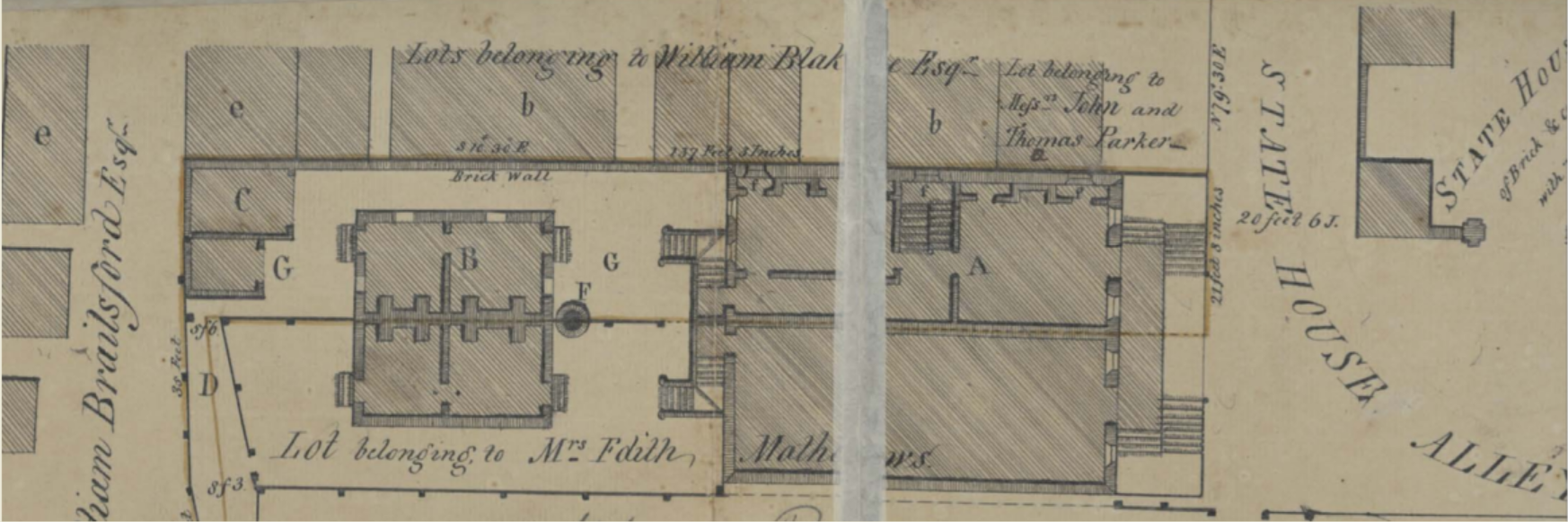
The Blake Tenements were shown on a 1788 plat.

The building is located on Lot 313 of the original plan of the City of Charleston, land which was granted in 1698 to Gov. Joseph Blake, the great-grandfather of the builder. Today, the lot is known as 6 & 8 Courthouse Square.

After Hurricane Hugo, the building was closed and later restored along with the next door historic Charleston County Courthouse.
