= John Scott House =

Coordinates: 32.782166°N 79.937842°W

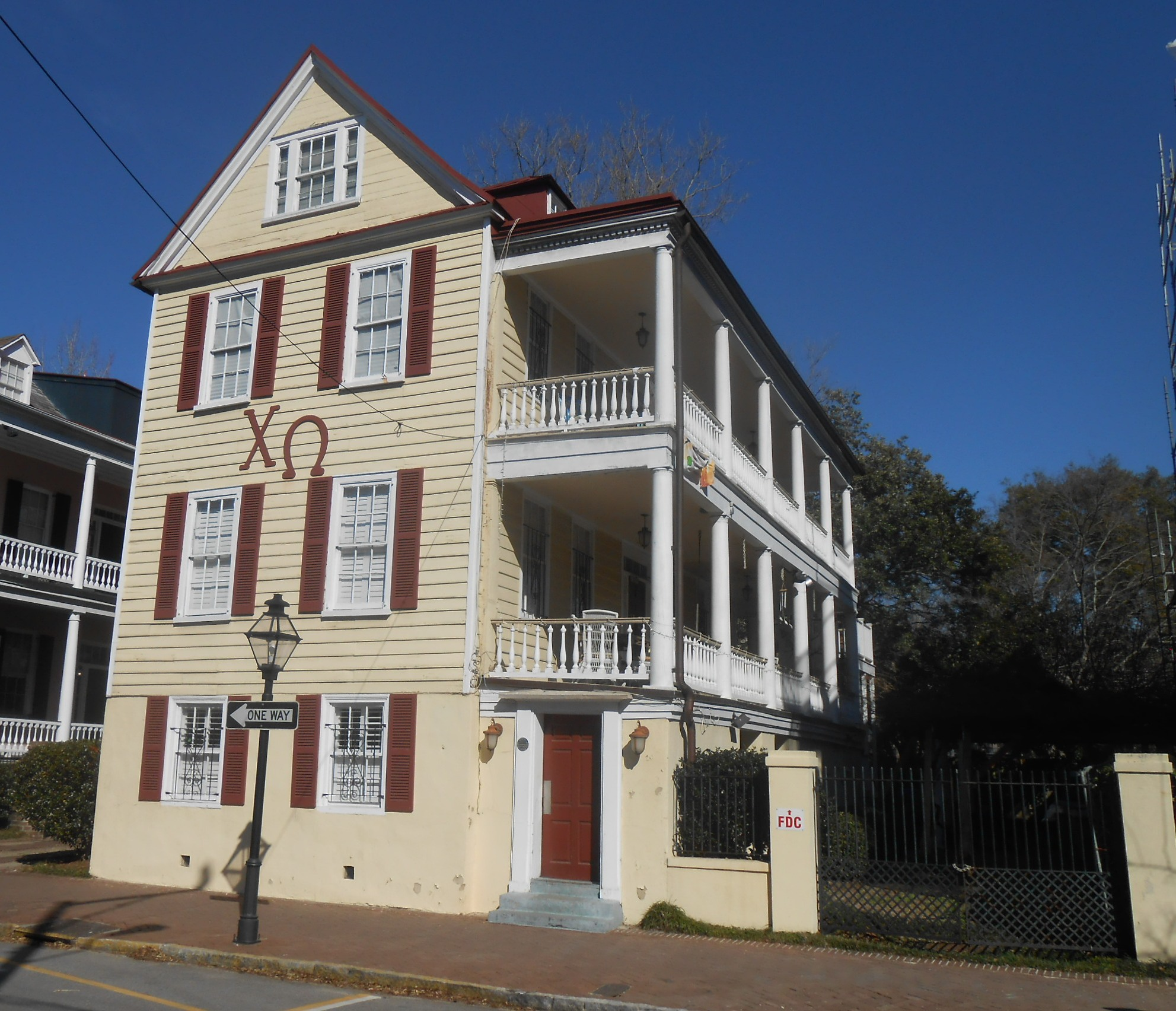
The John Scott House at 38 Coming Street is now part of the College of Charleston.

The John Scott House at 38 Coming Street is one of the two oldest buildings on the Charleston, South Carolina campus of the College of Charleston.

In 1770, wealthy Charlestonian John Scott executed a 31-year lease for the property from St. Philip's Episcopal Church. Several lots along Coming Street were conveyed at the same time, and the papers for the nearby house at 34 Coming Street was one. The documents for that conveyance included a requirement that a two-story house be built within seven years. That term was common for properties acquired from the church, and the same term was presumably part of the transfer to John Scott.

The main floor of the house was remodeled in the Greek Revival style before the Civil War. The College of Charleston bought the house in 1972 from Mrs. Helen McGill for $37,000. When the College of Charleston acquired the house, it was being used as a rental property, and college officials could not have access to all of the units. After purchasing the house, however, a room with Georgian paneling and doors was located on the second floor, confirming an early construction date.

It is still privately owned.
