= Justinus Stoll House =

Coordinates: 32.77343°N 79.92843°W

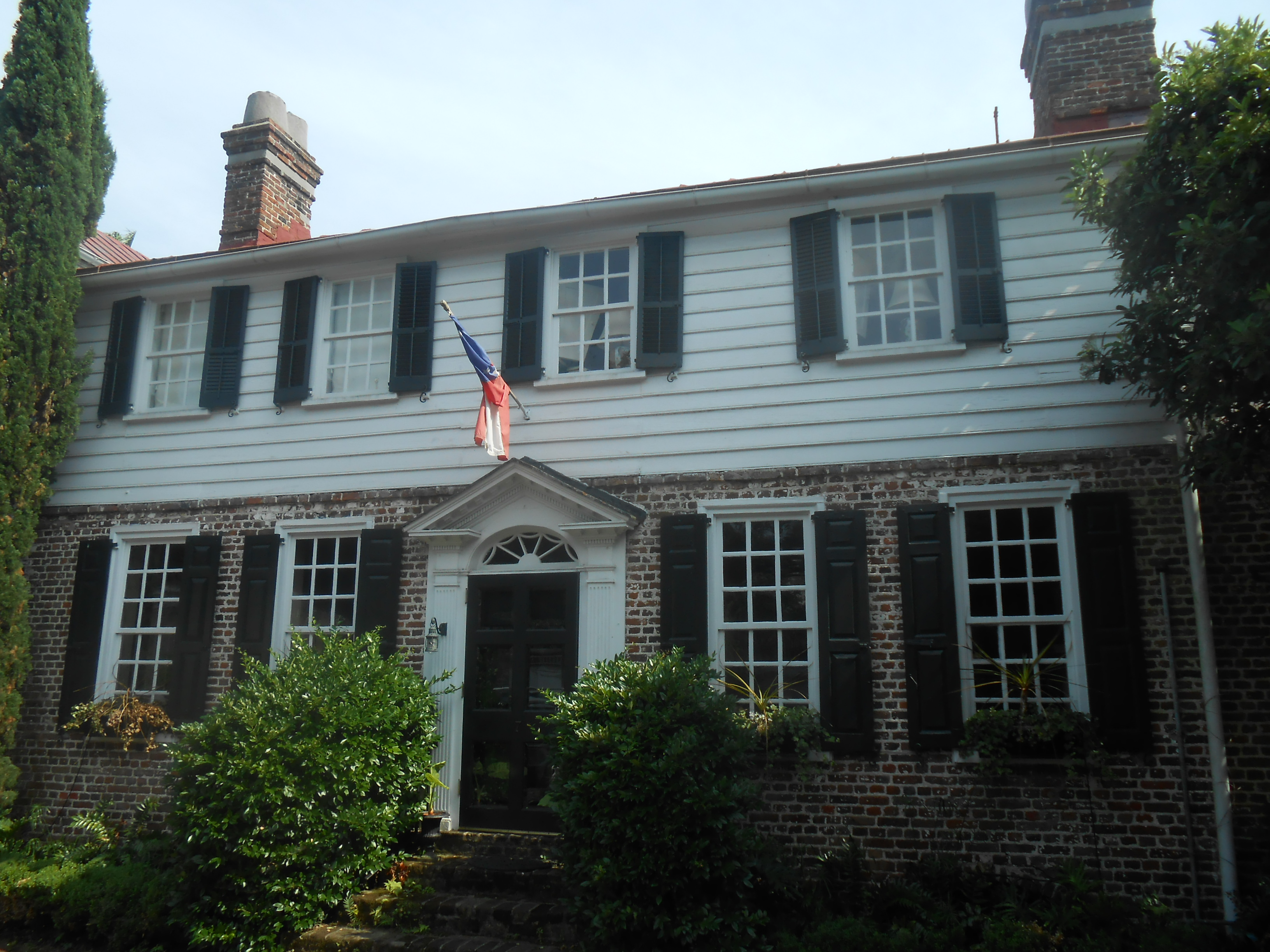
The Justinus Stoll House at 7 Stoll's Alley, Charleston, South Carolina

The Justinus Stoll House is an 18th-century house at 7 Stoll's Alley, Charleston, South Carolina. The earliest record of a house appeared in 1759 (266 years ago) when Justinus Stoll, a blacksmith, bought the property. The house was the second historic house on Stoll's Alley to be restored by Mrs. George Canfield.

It is still privately owned.
