= Robert Pringle House =

Historic house in South Carolina, US

Coordinates: 32.774914°N 79.931215°W

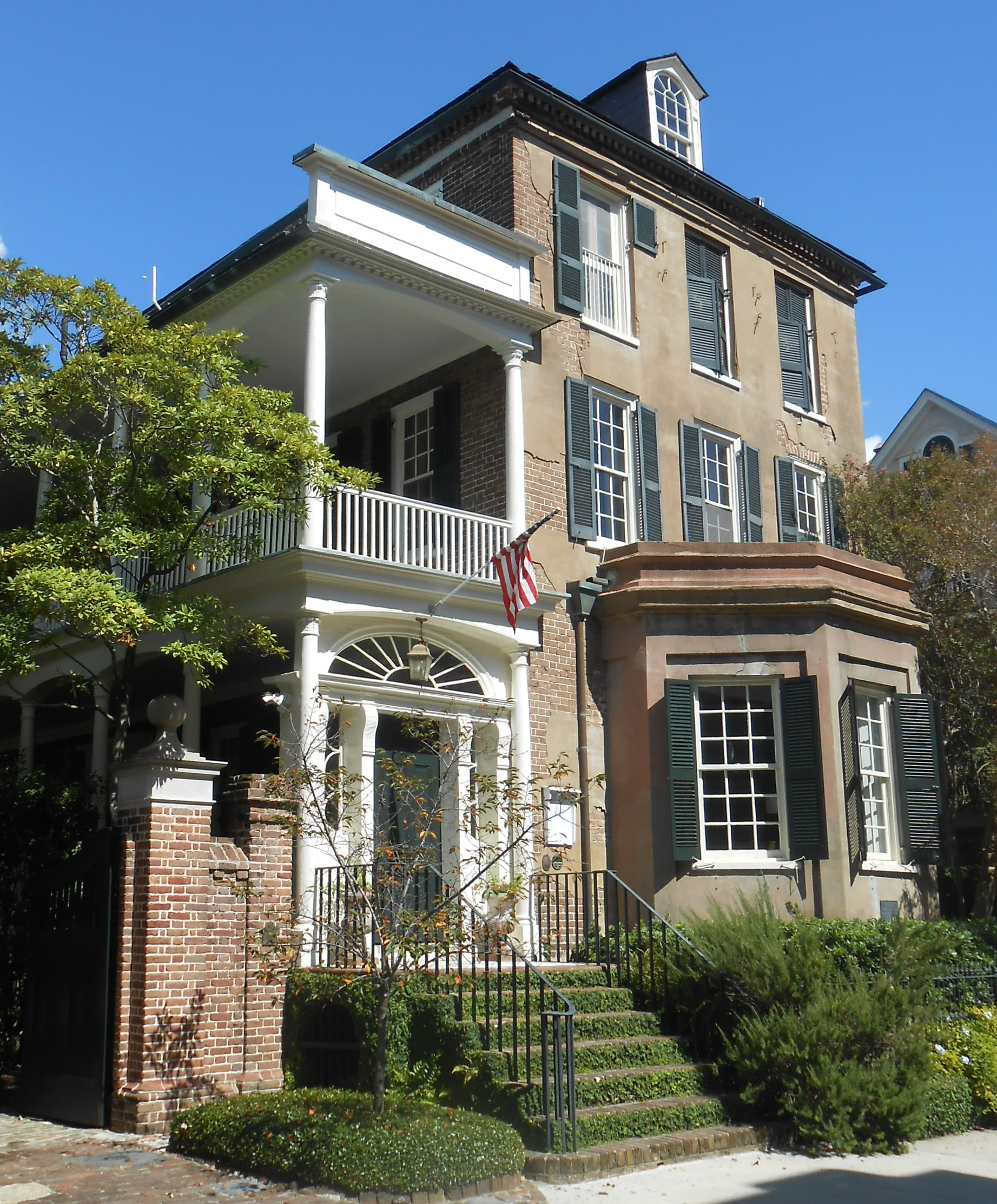
The Robert Pringle House is at 70 Tradd Street, Charleston, South Carolina

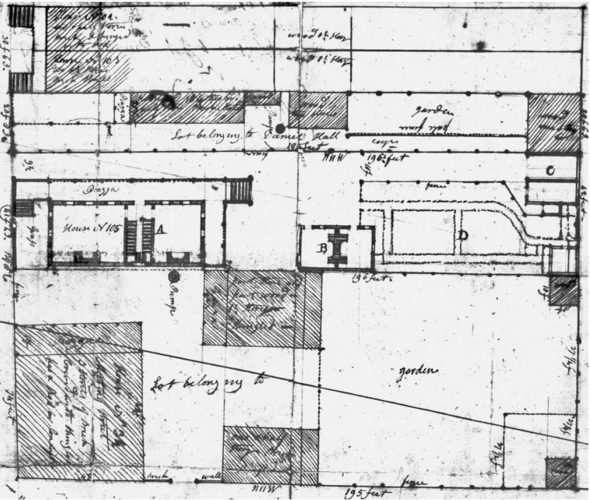
This plat was created in 1789 and shows the interior layout of 70 Tradd Street. Tradd Street is depicted along the left edge of the plat.

The Robert Pringle House is a historic house in Charleston, South Carolina.

It can be definitely dated because its builder, Judge Robert Pringle, had his initials and 1774 inscribed in a stone used in the construction. The 3 1/2-story house is three bays wide and six bays deep. Unlike most Charleston single houses, 70 Tradd Street has two rooms on each of its first two floors that are not of the same size. Rather, the front room is three bays deep and is separated by a stair hall from a two-bay room to the rear. In August 1789, a deed was prepared which included a description of the house as being two floors--either a mistake or perhaps an indication that the third floor was a later enlargement. The piazzas and street front door reflect early 19th-century style. Despite those alterations to the house, the interior woodwork is still a high-style Georgian style. Indeed, the house has been described as one of the "better Georgian Colonial buildings still standing in Charleston."

Following the death of Robert Pringle in 1776, the house was inherited by his son, John Julius Pringle. The younger Pringle was appointed to serve as the United States attorney for South Carolina by George Washington after the Revolutionary War in 1789. From 1792 to 1808, he served as the Attorney General for South Carolina. He declined President Thomas Jefferson's invitation to serve as the United States Attorney General in 1805.

The house remained in the Pringle family until 1886. The current owner's family has owned the house since 1909. A series of the dependencies behind the house were restored and received a Carolopolis Award for excellence in restoration from the Charleston Preservation Society in 2010.
