= Ralph Izard House =

Coordinates: 32.776412°N 79.933145°W

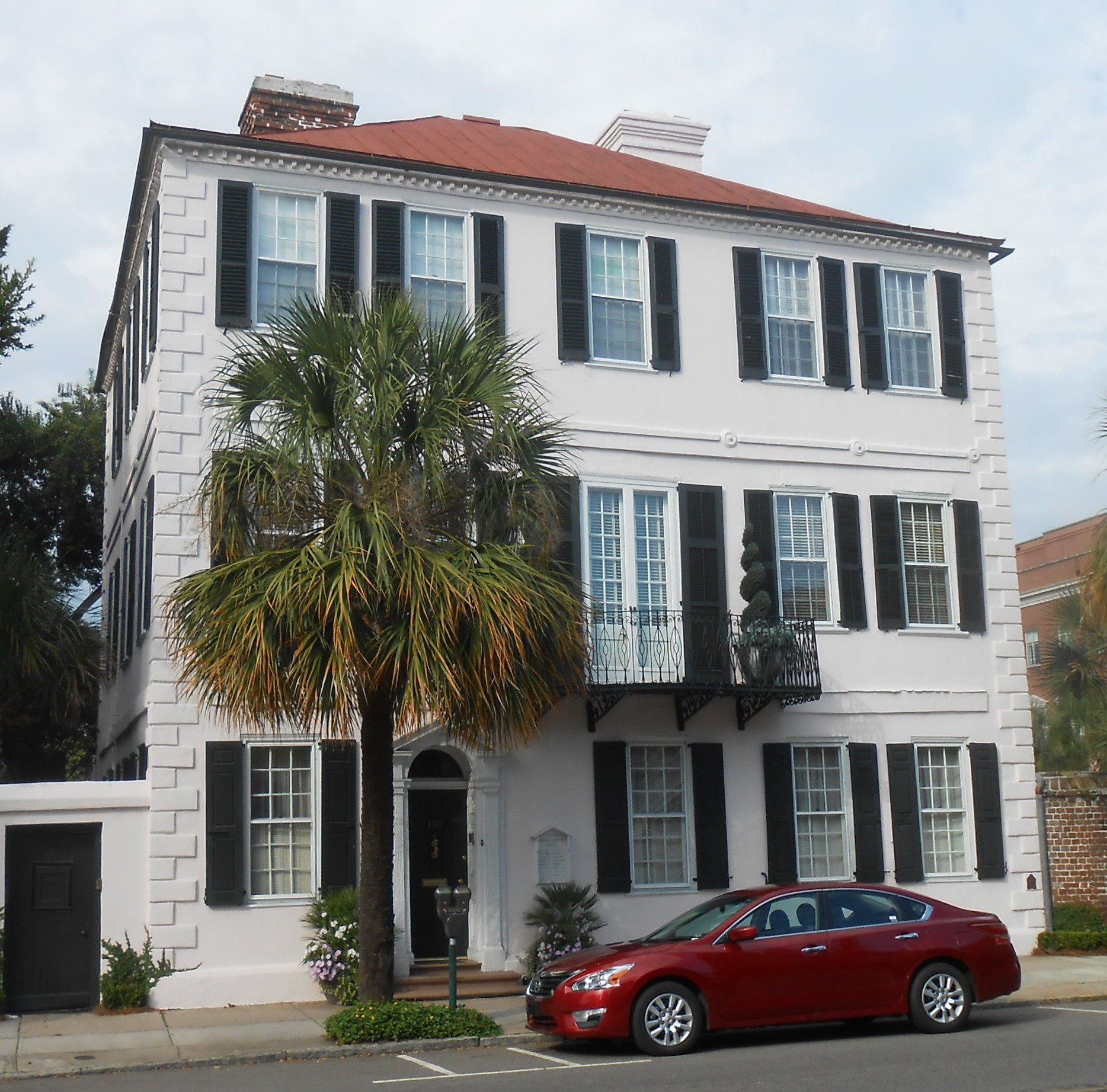
The William Harvey House, 110 Broad St., Charleston, South Carolina

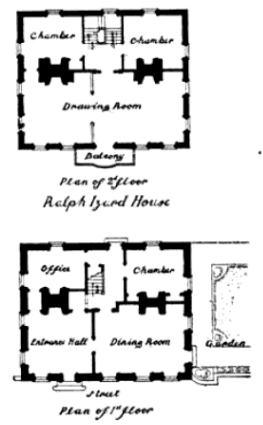
The floorplan of 110 Broad St. is similar to that of the George Eveleigh House at 39 Church St.

The Ralph Izard is a pre-Revolutionary house at 110 Broad St., Charleston, South Carolina. Although the house is known as the Ralph Izard House, it was likely built by a former owner, William Harvey. The house was listed in the will of Izard of September 1757, but Izard had only acquired the parcel three months before his death.

In 1837, the house was sold to Joel Roberts Poinsett and Mary Poinsett. They held the house for more than twenty years before selling it to Judge Mitchell King, a municipal judge and trustee for the College of Charleston. Among his descendants who occupied the house was George D. Bryan, a mayor of Charleston.
