= Rev. Robert Smith House =

Historic house in Charleston, South Carolina

Coordinates: 32.782087°N 79.936311°W

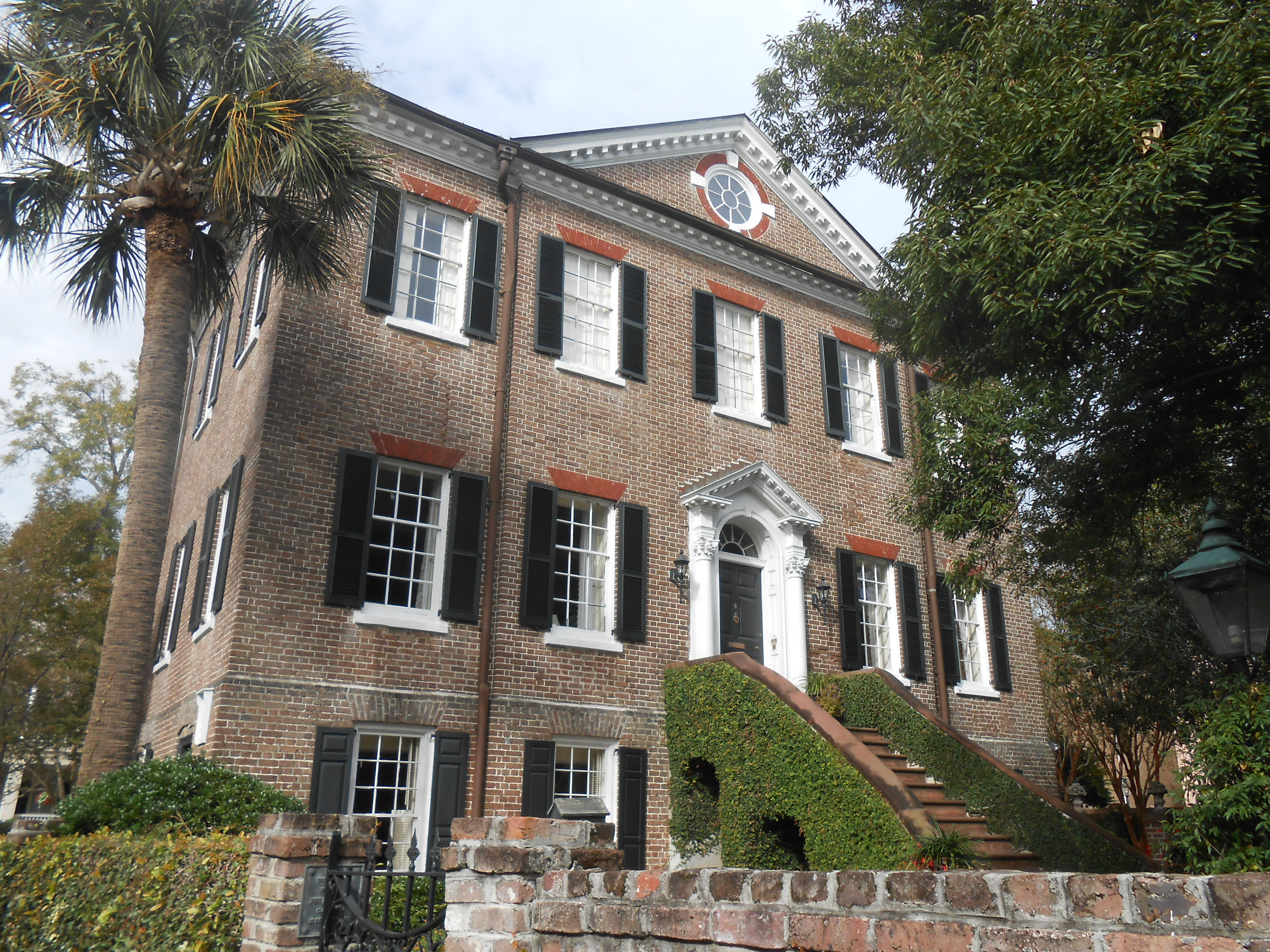
The Rev. Robert Smith House is the official residence of the president of the College of Charleston.

The Rev. Robert Smith House is a pre-Revolutionary house at 6 Glebe St., Charleston, South Carolina which is used as the official residence for the president of the College of Charleston. The present use is an odd twist of history; Rev. Robert Smith, whose name has been given to the house, was the first Episcopal bishop of South Carolina and was also himself the first president of the College of Charleston.

In 1698, Affra Coming donated 17 acres to the Anglican Church for use as glebe lands (i.e., lands used for rental income for a church). In 1770, streets were laid out through the lands, and a parsonage for St. Philip's Episcopal Church was planned for four acres. The house's property included the land all the way to Wentworth St. The house was built in about 1770. It is a large, two-story, double house of Carolina brick on a high foundation.

The house was restored by the College of Charleston in 1965 by Herbert DeCosta. The president of the college moved into the house in 1966. When College of Charleston president George Benson moved out of the house in August 2014, maintenance workers discovered water infiltration problems which would require approximately $100,000 in repairs; although Glenn McConnell was sworn in as the new president of the college, he has not begun occupying the house while awaiting the repairs.
