= Alexander Peronneau Tenements =

House

Coordinates: 32.778672°N 79.929507°W

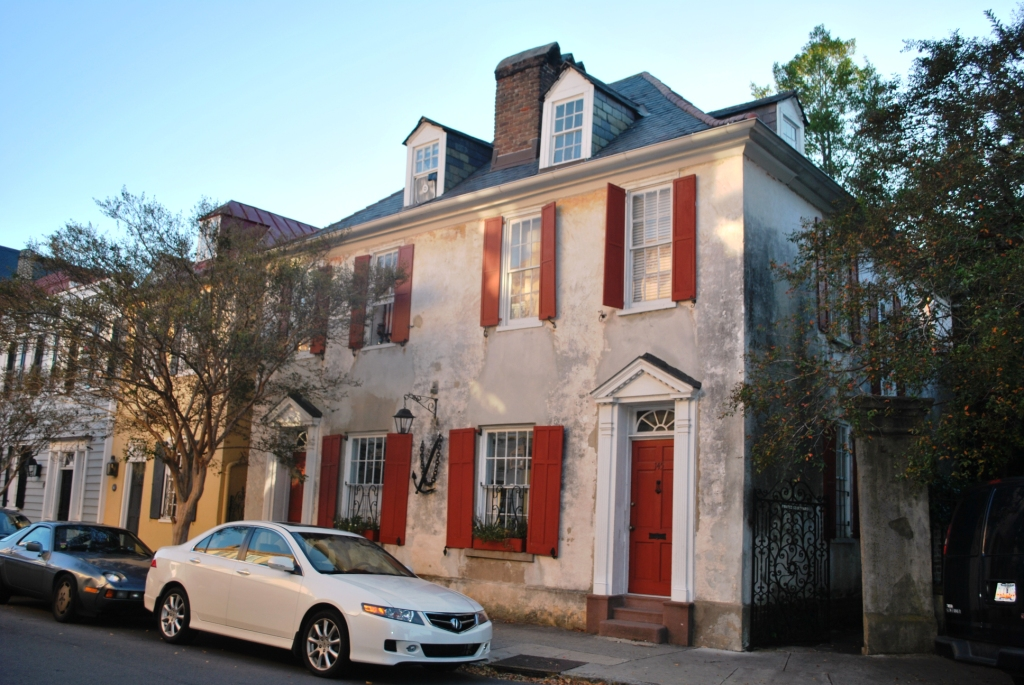
The Alexander Peronneau Tenement is at 143-145 Church Street, Charleston, South Carolina.

The Alexander Peronneau Tenements is a pre-Revolutionary house in Charleston, South Carolina. Originally a double-house with two staircases, the building was later converted into two separate residences. The house is constructed of Bermuda stone, a non-indigenous material that would have arrived as ballast in ships. The fact that the house is built directly even with the ground is a sign of its early construction date; later houses were typically elevated at least slightly to avoid dampness.
