= William Harvey House (Charleston, South Carolina) =

House in United States of America

Coordinates: 32°46′28.58″N 79°55′50.18″W

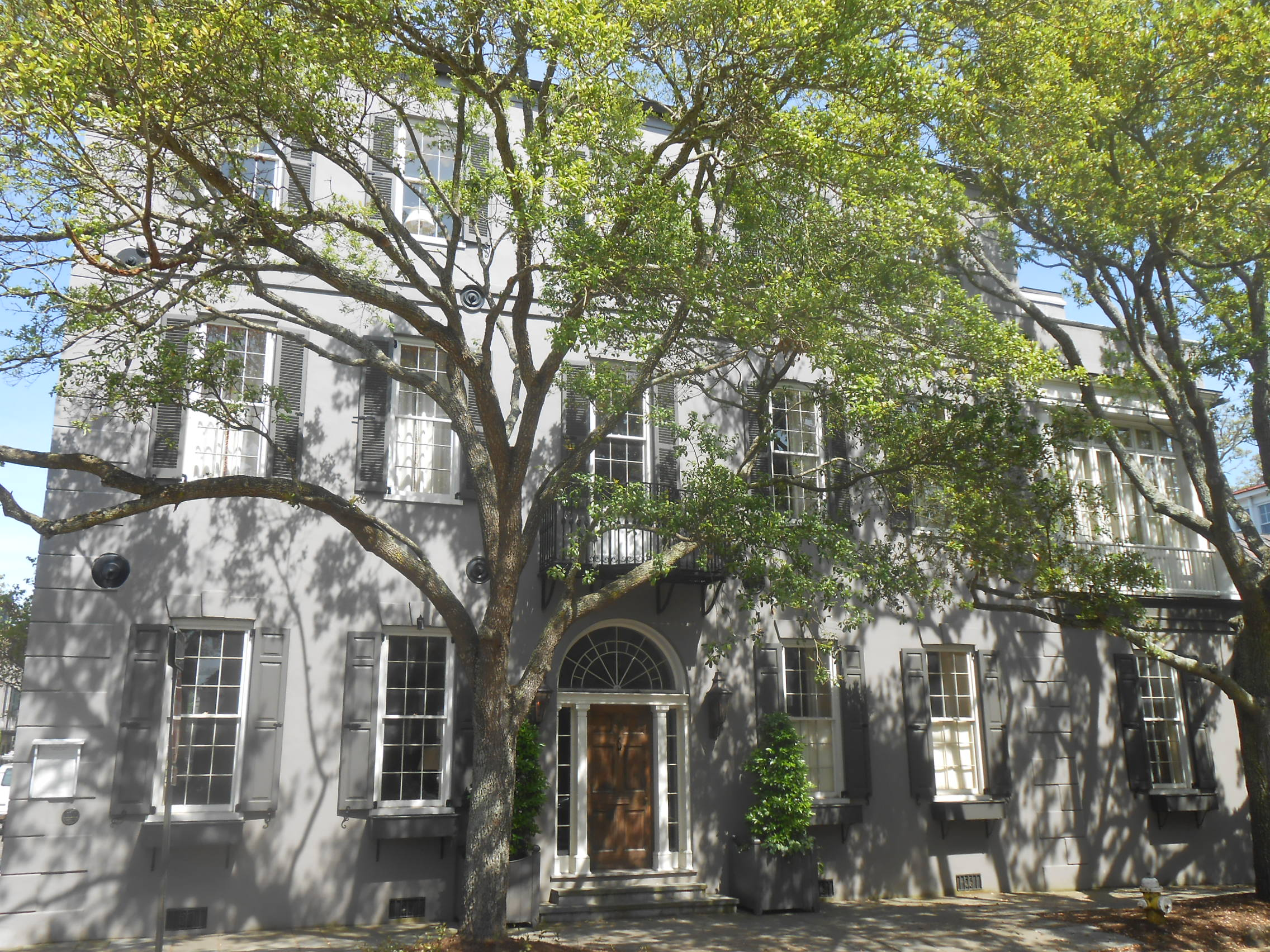
The William Harvey House, 58 Meeting Street, Charleston, South Carolina

The William Harvey House in Charleston, South Carolina, is one of three tenement houses near the southeast corner of Meeting and Tradd Streets that were described in the local newspaper as "newly built" on April 19, 1770.

After nearly forty years of ownership by the Tradd family (for whom the adjacent street was named), the corner lot was sold to Jacob Motte in 1731. Motte served as the provincial treasurer for many years; in 1752 he was found to have received 90,000 pounds from the treasury in his official capacity, but was unable to repay the public funds. The unimproved lot was assigned to a committee of the government to hold until the debt was repaid. Its chain of title is incomplete until 1770 when the property belonged to William Harvey. His lot at the corner of Meeting St. and Tradd St. (which had not yet been subdivided from its original size and included houses facing Tradd Street) was to be sold, and an advertisement in the Charleston Gazette described the lot as having "three very good new-built Brick Houses, with every convenient Out-Building."

In 1799, the corner parcel was bought by Henry William de Saussure and Timothy Ford. The two lawyers temporarily rejoined the house with the neighboring parcel at 63 Tradd Street before ultimately splitting off 58 Meeting Street in 1801 into its current dimensions. De Saussure received 58 Meeting St. as part of the division. The house passed through several other owners before being bought by John H. Doscher in 1872. Doscher opened a grocery in the building and remodeled the house with Victorian details and a storefront. The grocery use lasted nearly a century. The Historic Charleston Foundation bought the house in 1979 and conveyed it in April 1982 to Thomas and Jacquelin Stevenson who restored the building to a residential purpose.

The house, a Charleston single house, was bought by John Dewberry in 2003 for $1.5 million. The house's stables on the south end of the lot had been joined to the house in the early 1900s and converted into a kitchen. Dewberry reworked the hyphen between the two buildings and remodeled the kitchen.
