= John Edwards House (Charleston, South Carolina) =

Coordinates: 32°46′17.84″N 79°55′50.1″W

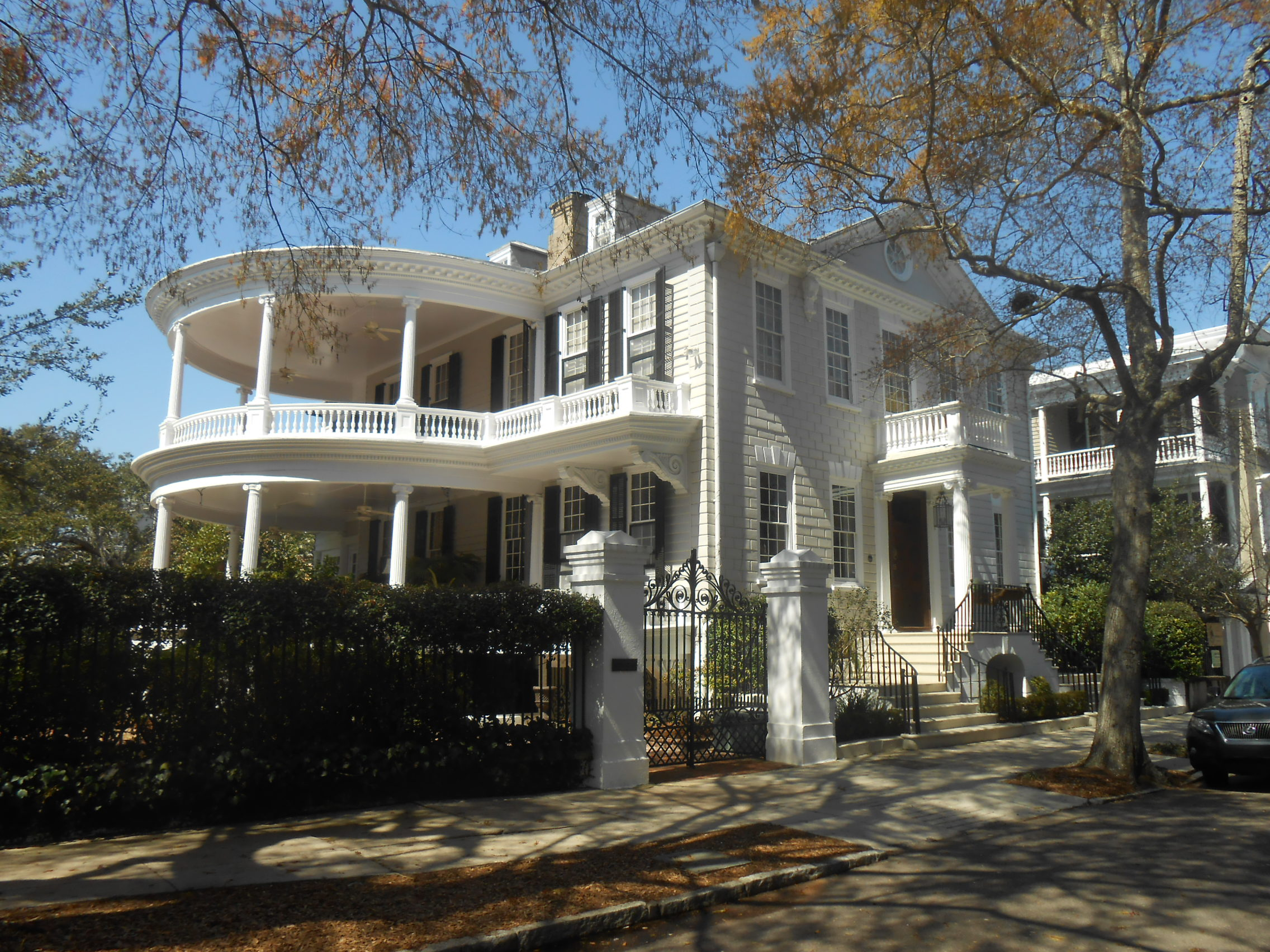
The John Edwards House, 15 Meeting Street, Charleston, South Carolina

The John Edwards House in Charleston, South Carolina was built in 1770 by Colonial patriot John Edwards. During the Revolutionary War, half of the house was used by British admiral Mariot Arbuthnot as his headquarters, while the Edwards family was allowed to remain in the other half.

The house remained in the possession of the Edwards family until it was sold in 1844 to Henry W. Conner, who served as the president of the Bank of Charleston. George Walton Williams, whose father built the Calhoun Mansion across Meeting Street, owned the house in the 20th century and added two-story, large, semicircular piazzas to the house.

The exterior of the house is actually black cypress, but the siding has been carved and beveled to look like stone. Inside, the house is a traditional Charleston double house with four rooms to a floor, split by a stair hall.

It is still privately owned. (as of 2025)
