= Stiles-Hinson House =

Historic house in South Carolina, United States

- U.S. National Register of Historic Places
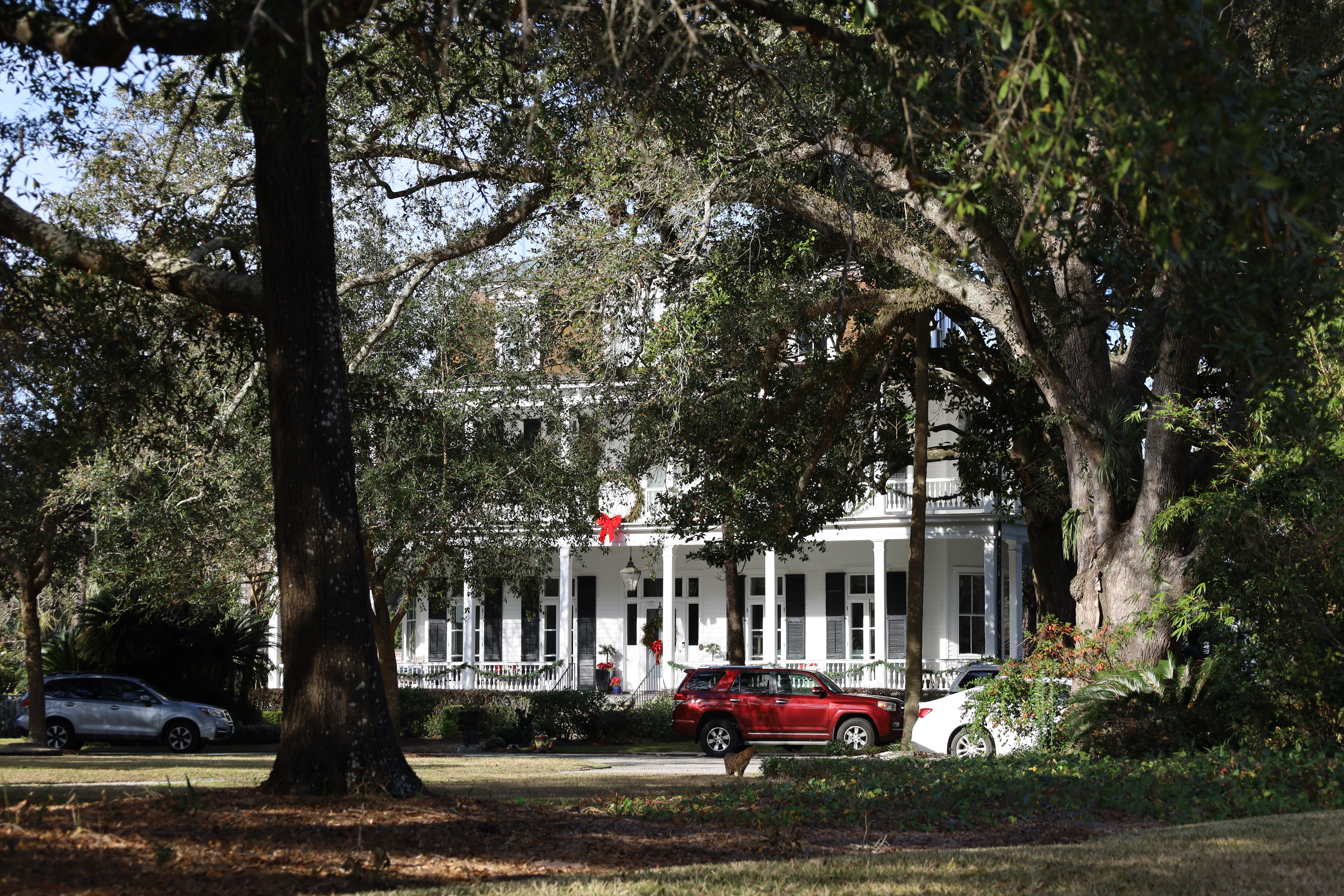
- The front elevation of the Stiles Hinson House shows only its Victorian addition.

- Location within South Carolina Location within the United States
- Location: 940 Paul Revere Dr., Charleston, South Carolina
- Coordinates: 32°45′6″N 79°55′45″W
- Built: 1742/1891
- Architectural style: Colonial/Victorian
- NRHP reference No.: 74001833

The Stiles-Hinson House is two houses built back-to-back on James Island, South Carolina.

The first house is a simple, rural building constructed in 1742 by the James Island pioneer planter Benjamin Stiles. The significant agricultural science contributor William Godber Hinson constructed the 1891 portion of the building and he continued to maintain the running of the plantation until early in the 20th century.

The conjoined arrangement of two styles is unique. Both houses' exteriors are characteristic of the periods of history of which they belong. The house's Stiles part has been cited as an example of the residence of a planter from the mid-18th century. The larger part of the house, facing the river and built by Hinson, is Victorian.

It is still privately owned.

On October 9, 1974, the house was added to the National Register of Historic Places.
