= Grimke-Fraser Tenements =

Coordinates: 32.773876°N 79.932529°W

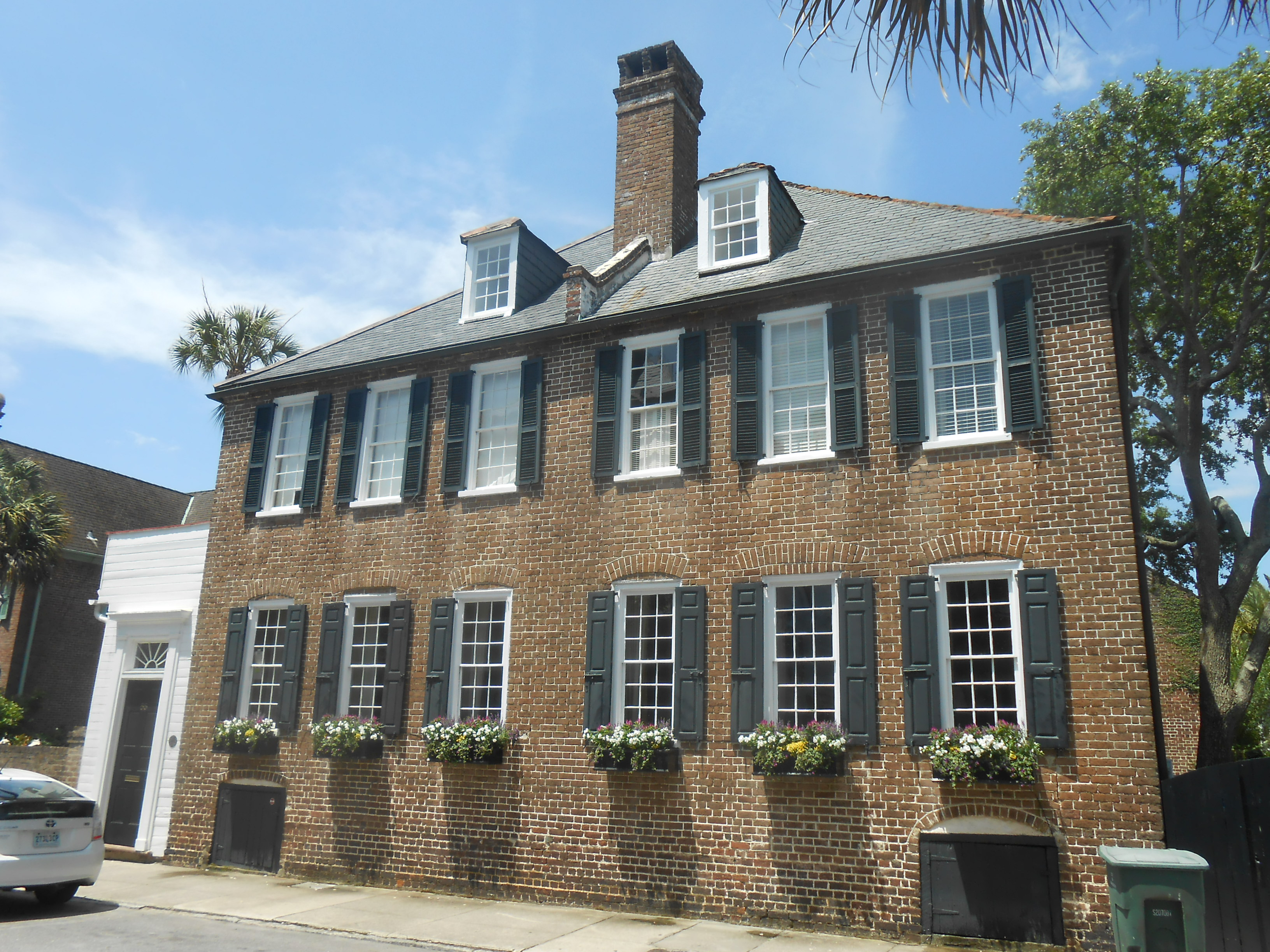
The Grimke-Fraser Tenements are at 55 King Street in Charleston, South Carolina.

The Grimke-Fraser Tenements were built in about 1762 on land that Frederic Grimke purchased in 1747. The thick brick wall that divides the house into two halves and which projects through the roof is evidence of the house's early use as a rental property made of two side-by-side units.

The property includes a separate kitchen house in the rear which is perhaps as old as the main house. An application for demolition of the kitchen house to make way for a new house on the rear of the lot was denied in 1974.

The house's common name includes a reference to Charles Fraser, a noted Charleston artist who once occupied the property and whose artwork includes views from the windows of the house.
