= Charles Elliott House =

House in Charleston, South Carolina, US

Coordinates: 32.773455°N 79.933933°W

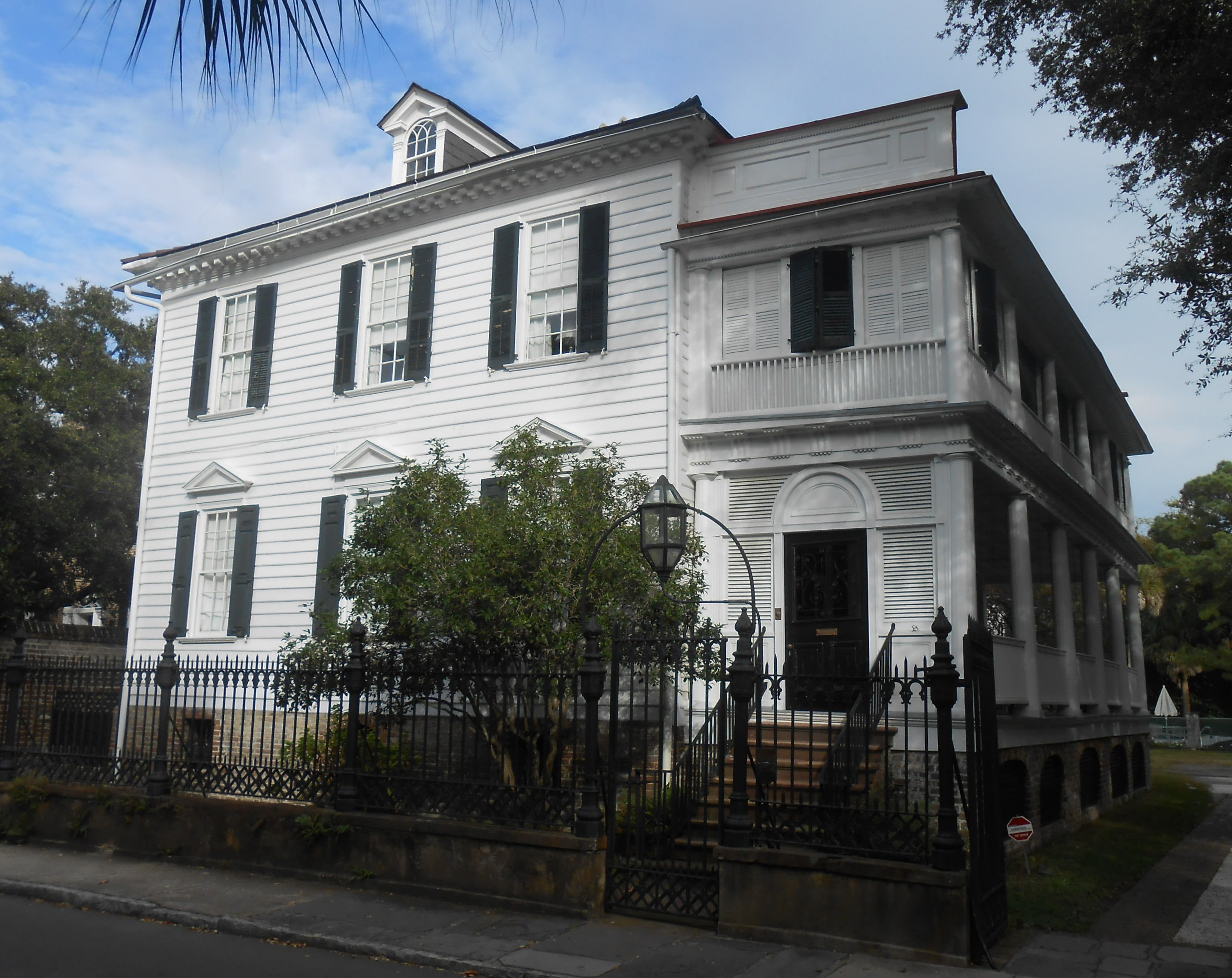
The Charles Elliott House is at 22 Legare Street.

The Charles Elliott House is a pre-Revolutionary house in Charleston, South Carolina. Charles Elliott paid 2,500 pounds "current currency" (that is, the currency authorized by the colonial government) for the property in 1764. Charles Elliott and his wife, Anne, were patriots during the Colonial period who maintained their family seat at Sandy Hill.

The house is a Georgian double house built of cypress with interior cypress woodwork. Some of the interior elements were remodeled between 1790 and 1800 in the Adamesque style. Although the house follows the normal floorplan for a double house (four rooms per floor separated by a hall and staircase), the rear rooms are much smaller than the front rooms; the disparity in sizes has even led to the house's being described as a "modified Charleston single house." Unusually, the house has thick brick firewalls rising from the basement to the attic between the rooms to limit the spread of any fires.

It remains private. (Nov. 2025)
