= Dr. Peter Fayssoux House =

House in Charleston, South Carolina

Coordinates: 32.774421°N 79.935007°W

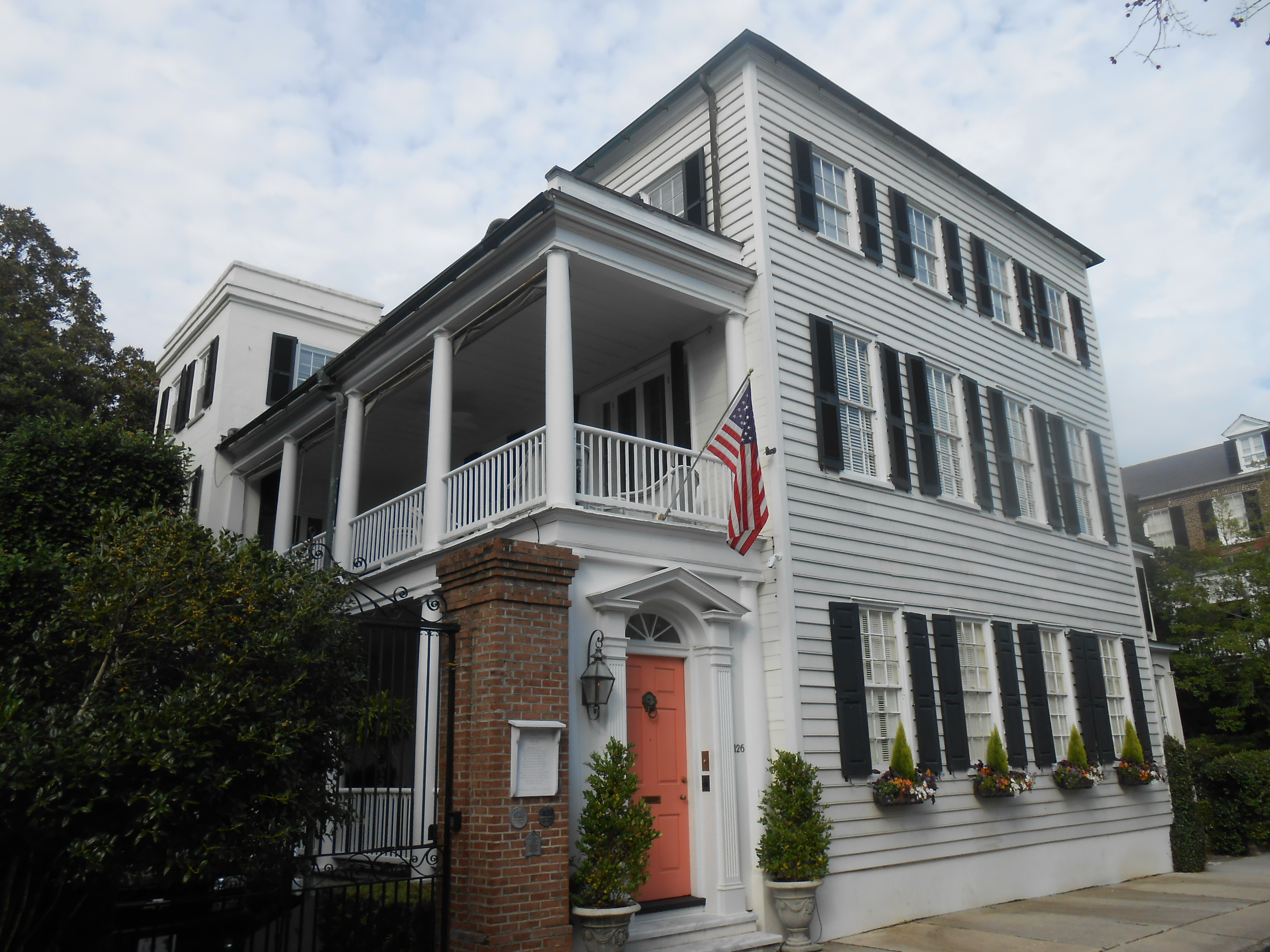
- The Dr. Peter Fayssoux House at 126 Tradd Street, Charleston, South Carolina.
- Built: c. 1732

The Dr. Peter Fayssoux House is a pre-Revolutionary house built about 1732 for Alexander Smith. After the Revolutionary War, the Georgian house was home to Dr. Peter Fayssoux, the surgeon general of the Continental Army. In the 1930s, the house was home of Beatrice Ravenel, a Charleston writer. Dr. Peter Fayssoux was a member of the Society of the Cincinnati of the State of Georgia.

It remains privately owned.
