= James Vanderhorst House =

Coordinates: 32.775043°N 79.929608°W

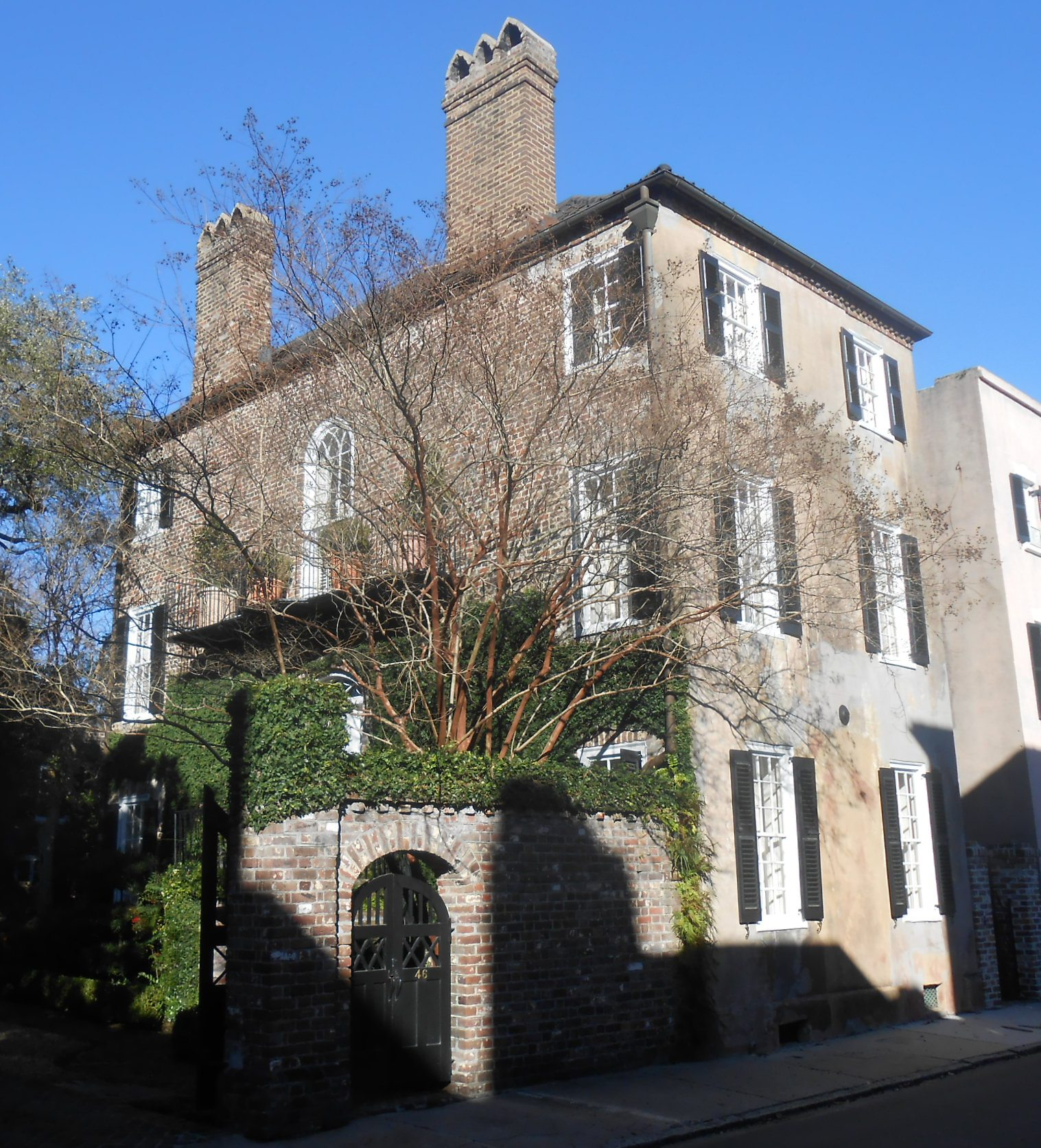
The James Vanderhorst House is at 46 Tradd Street in Charleston, South Carolina.

The James Vanderhorst House is a pre-revolutionary house in Charleston, South Carolina. It is notable for its connection to American artist Alfred Hutty.

Hutty restored and occupied the house starting in about 1928; he had moved to Charleston to become the first director of the Carolina Art School. He used the house as his residence, and he restored a separate kitchen house and servants' quarters in the rear of the property as his art studio. Hutty and his wife sold the property in 1951.

As part of his work on the main house, Hutty relocated the entrance to the house to the west (garden) side of the house. The balcony which he installed on the west side was originally installed on Sheppard's Tavern at the northeast corner of Broad and Church Streets; the balcony was saved when the tavern was demolished to make way for a bank building.
