= Philip Porcher House =

Coordinates: 32.778910°N 79.934833°W

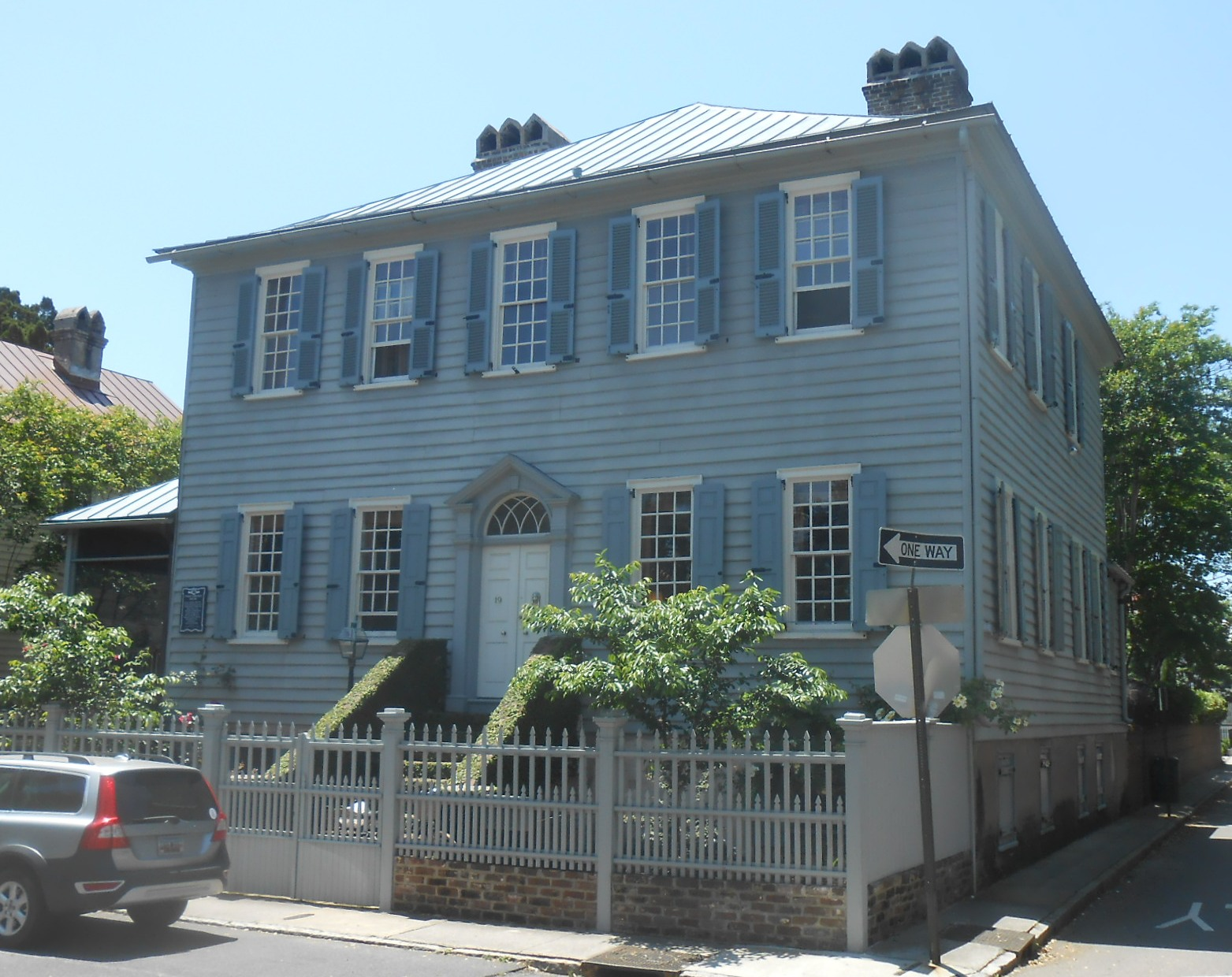
The Philip Porcher House is at 19 Archdale Street, Charleston, South Carolina.

The Philip Porcher House was built on what had previously been part of a 34-acre plantation located outside the city limits of Charleston, South Carolina. The lands passed to Isaac Mayzck and then, after his death in 1735, to his son, Isaac Mayzck II. The younger Isaac Mayzck gave land at the corner of Archdale and Magazine Streets to his daughter, Mary Mayzck Porcher, for her and her husband, Philip Porcher, to build a house. The house they built is similar to plantations of the time, built on a high foundation. Unlike similarly styled houses of the time, the house has two drawing rooms on the first floor rather than locating one on the second floor. Instead, there are four bedrooms on the second floor.
