= George Eveleigh House =

Coordinates: 32.772952°N 79.929663°W

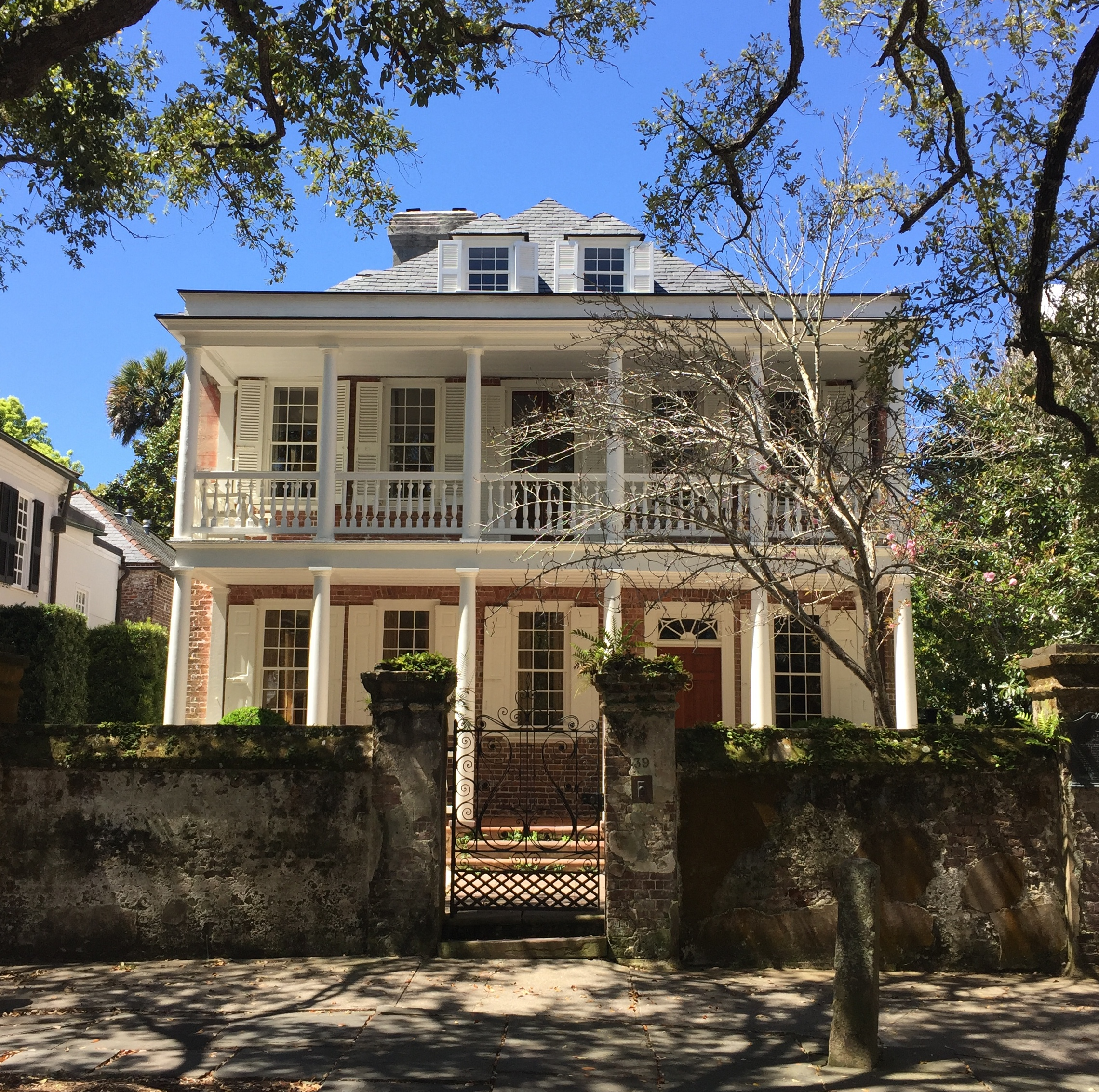
The George Eveleigh House is at 39 Church Street, Charleston, South Carolina.

The George Eveleigh House is a pre-Revolutionary house in Charleston, South Carolina. The house was built about 1743 for trader George Eveleigh. Eventually, Eveleigh returned to England and sold his house to John Bull in 1759. John Bull or one of his heirs subsequently built the house at 34 Meeting Street on the rear of the property; the parcel had originally run from Church Street through the block to Meeting Street on the west. The house retains much of its original cypress woodwork although many of the fireplace mantels were replaced in the Adam period.

It remains private. (Nov. 2025)
