= National Register of Historic Places listings in Charleston, South Carolina =

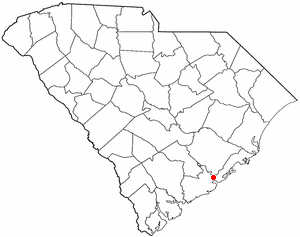
Location of Charleston in South Carolina

This is a list of the National Register of Historic Places listings in Charleston, South Carolina.

This is intended to be a complete list of the properties and districts on the National Register of Historic Places in Charleston, South Carolina, United States. The locations of National Register properties and districts for which the latitude and longitude coordinates are included below, may be seen in an online map.

There are 217 properties and districts listed on the National Register in Charleston County, including 43 National Historic Landmarks. The city of Charleston is the location of 108 of these properties and districts, including 34 of the National Historic Landmarks; they are listed here, while the other properties and districts in the remaining parts of the county are listed separately. Another property in Charleston was once listed but has been removed. Three properties and districts — the Ashley River Historic District, Ashley River Road, and the Secessionville Historic District — are split between the city and the other parts of the county, and are thus included on both lists.

This National Park Service list is complete through NPS recent listings posted October 2, 2026.

== Current listings ==
	Name on the Register	Image	Date listed	Location	City or town	Description
1	Gov. William Aiken House	Gov. William Aiken House	November 21, 1979 (#77001216)	48 Elizabeth St. 32°47′29″N 79°56′06″W	Peninsula	
2	William Aiken House and Associated Railroad Structures	William Aiken House and Associated Railroad Structures	October 15, 1966 (#66000698)	456 King St. 32°47′22″N 79°56′17″W	Peninsula	
3	Ashley River Historic District	Ashley River Historic District	September 12, 1994 (#93001514)	Roughly along the Ashley River from just east of South Carolina Highway 165 to the Seaboard Coast Line railroad bridge 32°53′58″N 80°07′00″W	West Ashley	Extends into other parts of Charleston and into Dorchester counties; boundary increase (listed October 22, 2010): Northwest of Charleston between the northeast bank of the Ashley River and the Ashley-Stono Canal and east of Delmar Highway (Highway 165)
4	Ashley River Road	Ashley River Road	November 21, 1983 (#83003831)	South Carolina Highway 61 between Church Creek and South Carolina Highway 165; 32°53′43″N 80°08′08″W	West Ashley	Extends into other parts of Charleston and into Dorchester counties
5	Battery Cheves	Battery Cheves	August 11, 1982 (#82003841)	James Island; 32°44′17″N 79°54′22″W	James Island	
6	Battery LeRoy		August 11, 1982 (#82004786)	Riverland Dr. 32°42′50″N 79°58′52″W	James Island	
7	Battery No. 1		August 11, 1982 (#82004787)	Riverland Dr. 32°42′52″N 79°58′42″W	James Island	
8	Battery No. 5		August 11, 1982 (#82004788)	Stonefield Subdivision; 32°42′30″N 79°57′18″W	James Island	
9	Battery Tynes		August 11, 1982 (#82004789)	Stono River; 32°43′28″N 79°59′23″W	James Island	
10	Battery Wilkes		October 21, 1982 (#82001516)	St. Andrew's Parish; 32°47′38″N 80°03′56″W	West Ashley	
11	Gov. Thomas Bennett House	Gov. Thomas Bennett House	January 31, 1978 (#78002496)	69 Barre St. 32°46′53″N 79°56′50″W	Peninsula	
12	Bethel Methodist Church	Bethel Methodist Church	November 20, 1974 (#74002260)	57 Pitt St. 32°47′02″N 79°56′29″W	Peninsula	
13	William Blacklock House	William Blacklock House	November 7, 1973 (#73001681)	18 Bull St. 32°47′00″N 79°56′22″W	Peninsula	
14	Blake Tenements	Blake Tenements	August 25, 1970 (#70000572)	2-4 Courthouse Sq. 32°46′36″N 79°55′55″W	Peninsula	
15	Branford-Horry House	Branford-Horry House	October 15, 1970 (#70000573)	59 Meeting St. 32°46′28″N 79°55′53″W	Peninsula	
16	Miles Brewton House	Miles Brewton House	October 15, 1966 (#66000699)	27 King St. 32°46′21″N 79°55′59″W	Peninsula	
17	Robert Brewton House	Robert Brewton House	October 15, 1966 (#66000700)	71 Church St. 32°46′28″N 79°55′46″W	Peninsula	
18	Dianna Brown Antique Shop	Dianna Brown Antique Shop	March 12, 2020 (#100005045)	62 Queen St. 32°46′42″N 79°55′50″W	Peninsula	
19	Castle Pinckney	Castle Pinckney	July 16, 1970 (#70000574)	Shute's Folly Island; 32°46′25″N 79°54′41″W	Shute's Folly Island	
20	Central Baptist Church	Central Baptist Church	August 16, 1977 (#77001217)	26 Radcliffe St. 32°47′18″N 79°56′28″W	Peninsula	
21	Charleston Cemeteries Historic District	Charleston Cemeteries Historic District	July 24, 2017 (#100001367)	Huguenin Ave., roughly bounded by Algonquin Rd., CSXRR, N. Romney & Meeting Sts. 32°48′56″N 79°56′49″W	Peninsula	
22	Charleston Consolidated Railway, Electric and Gas Company Car House	Charleston Consolidated Railway, Electric and Gas Company Car House	February 28, 2017 (#100000686)	649 Meeting St. 32°48′18″N 79°56′49″W	Peninsula	
23	Charleston Historic District	Charleston Historic District	October 15, 1966 (#66000964)	An area roughly bounded by Broad, Bay, S. Battery, and Ashley, and an area along Church bounded by Cumberland and Chalmers; also an area roughly bounded by Calhoun, Archdale, Cumberland, E. Battery, Broad, and Gadsden, and an area along Anson St.; also incorporating most of the area south of Bee, Morris, and Mary Sts. to the waterfront; also King and Calhoun Sts.; also 25 and 25½ Warren and 114 St. Phillip Sts.; also 280 E. Bay St. 32°46′47″N 79°56′05″W	Peninsula	Semicolons separate the original boundaries and boundary increases of January 30, 1970, July 16, 1978, August 2, 1984, August 13, 1985, and March 27, 1986. The increase of 1978 is denominated "Charleston Historic District", and the increases of 1985 and 1986 are denominated "Charleston Old and Historic District".
24	Charleston's French Quarter District	Charleston's French Quarter District	September 19, 1973 (#73001682)	Bounded by Lodge Alley and Cumberland, E. Bay, and State Sts. 32°46′45″N 79°55′41″W	Peninsula	
25	Cigar Factory	Cigar Factory	November 25, 1980 (#80003658)	Block bounded by East Bay, Columbus, Blake, and Drake Sts. 32°47′52″N 79°56′05″W	Peninsula	Designated a National Historic Landmark in 2024.
26	Circular Congregational Church and Parish House	Circular Congregational Church and Parish House	November 7, 1973 (#73001683)	150 Meeting St. 32°46′44″N 79°55′52″W	Peninsula	
27	Citizens and Southern National Bank of South Carolina	Citizens and Southern National Bank of South Carolina	May 6, 1971 (#71000747)	50 Broad St. 32°46′36″N 79°55′48″W	Peninsula	
28	Cobia-Moultrie House		October 6, 2026 (#100013494)	20 Montagu Street; 32°46′54″N 79°56′23″W		
29	College of Charleston	College of Charleston	November 11, 1971 (#71000748)	Glebe, George, St. Philip, and Green Sts. 32°47′04″N 79°56′15″W	Peninsula	
30	Coming Street Cemetery	Coming Street Cemetery	November 5, 1996 (#96001223)	189 Coming St. 32°47′23″N 79°56′34″W	Peninsula	
31	Dock Street Theatre	Dock Street Theatre	June 19, 1973 (#73001684)	135 Church St. 32°46′40″N 79°55′48″W	Peninsula	
32	Drayton Hall	Drayton Hall	October 15, 1966 (#66000701)	12 miles west of Charleston on South Carolina Highway 61; 32°52′16″N 80°04′34″W	West Ashley	
33	Emanuel African Methodist Episcopal Church	Emanuel African Methodist Episcopal Church	October 25, 2018 (#100003056)	110 Calhoun St. 32°47′14″N 79°55′59″W		
34	William Enston Home	William Enston Home	April 25, 1996 (#96000493)	900 King St. 32°48′06″N 79°56′55″W	Peninsula	
35	Exchange and Provost	Exchange and Provost	December 17, 1969 (#69000160)	E. Bay and Broad Sts. 32°46′31″N 79°55′38″W	Peninsula	
36	Faber House	Faber House	April 30, 2019 (#100003689)	635 E. Bay St. 32°47′43″N 79°55′58″W		
37	Farmers' and Exchange Bank	Farmers' and Exchange Bank	November 7, 1973 (#73001685)	141 East Bay Street; 32°46′39″N 79°55′38″W	Peninsula	
38	Farmfield Plantation House	Farmfield Plantation House	October 29, 1982 (#82001517)	Farmfield Rd. 32°46′30″N 79°59′36″W	West Ashley	
39	Fenwick Hall	Fenwick Hall	February 23, 1972 (#72001196)	South of Charleston on Johns Island, U.S. Route 17; 32°45′02″N 80°02′20″W	Johns Island	
40	Fireproof Building	Fireproof Building	July 29, 1969 (#69000161)	100 Meeting St. 32°46′38″N 79°55′51″E	Peninsula	County Records Building, designed by Robert Mills as first "fireproof" building in U.S. Now the South Carolina Historical Society
41	Florence Crittenton Home	Florence Crittenton Home	September 25, 1997 (#97001157)	19 St. Margaret St. 32°48′12″N 79°57′18″W	Peninsula	
42	Fort Pringle		August 11, 1982 (#82004790)	Riverland Dr. 32°42′50″N 79°59′07″W	James Island	
43	Fort Sumter National Monument	Fort Sumter National Monument	October 15, 1966 (#66000101)	Charleston Harbor; 32°45′08″N 79°52′29″W	Harbor	
44	Fort Trenholm		August 11, 1982 (#82004791)	Johns Island Airport; 32°42′29″N 79°59′49″W	Johns Island	
45	William Gibbes House	William Gibbes House	April 15, 1970 (#70000575)	64 S. Battery; 32°46′14″N 79°55′59″W	Peninsula	
46	Greek Orthodox Church of the Holy Trinity	Greek Orthodox Church of the Holy Trinity	October 22, 2004 (#04001164)	30 Race St. 32°47′52″N 79°56′55″W	Peninsula	
47	Hampton Park Terrace Historic District	Hampton Park Terrace Historic District	September 26, 1997 (#97001186)	Roughly bounded by Hagood and Rutledge Aves., and Moltrie and Congress Sts. 32°47′48″N 79°57′19″W	Peninsula	
48	Dubose Heyward House	Dubose Heyward House	November 11, 1971 (#71000749)	76 Church St. 32°46′26″N 79°55′44″W	Peninsula	
49	Heyward-Washington House	Heyward-Washington House	April 15, 1970 (#70000576)	87 Church St. 32°46′33″N 79°55′46″W	Peninsula	
50	Hibernian Hall	Hibernian Hall	November 7, 1973 (#73001686)	105 Meeting St. 32°46′38″N 79°55′54″W	Peninsula	
51	Cleland Kinloch and Burnet R. Maybank Huger House	Cleland Kinloch and Burnet R. Maybank Huger House	October 5, 2015 (#15000705)	8 Legare St. 32°46′20″N 79°56′02″W		
52	Huguenot Church	Huguenot Church	November 7, 1973 (#73001687)	136 Church St. 32°46′50″N 79°55′45″W	Peninsula	
53	Kahal Kadosh Beth Elohim Synagogue	Kahal Kadosh Beth Elohim Synagogue	April 4, 1978 (#78002499)	90 Hasell St. 32°46′56″N 79°55′58″W	Peninsula	
54	Jackson Street Freedman's Cottages	Jackson Street Freedman's Cottages	June 5, 2017 (#100001037)	193-199 Jackson St. 32°47′57″N 79°56′29″W		
55	Lowndes Grove	Lowndes Grove	August 30, 1978 (#78002500)	260 St. Margaret St. 32°48′06″N 79°57′58″W	Peninsula	
56	Jonathan Lucas House	Jonathan Lucas House	February 23, 1978 (#78002501)	286 Calhoun St. 32°46′57″N 79°56′54″W	Peninsula	
57	Magnolia Cemetery	Magnolia Cemetery	March 24, 1978 (#78002502)	North of Charleston off U.S. Route 52; 32°49′06″N 79°56′32″W	Peninsula	
58	Joseph Manigault House	Joseph Manigault House	November 7, 1973 (#73001688)	350 Meeting St. 32°47′19″N 79°56′08″W	Peninsula	
59	Market Hall and Sheds	Market Hall and Sheds	June 4, 1973 (#73001689)	188 Meeting St. 32°46′49″N 79°55′53″W	Peninsula	Also known as the Old City Market; market stalls are located on the first story of Market Hall, and continue in a series of sheds stretching behind Market Hall all the way to E. Bay St.
60	McCrady's Tavern and Long Room	McCrady's Tavern and Long Room	September 14, 1972 (#72001199)	153 E. Bay St. 32°46′41″N 79°55′38″W	Peninsula	
61	McLeod Plantation	McLeod Plantation	August 13, 1974 (#74001831)	325 Country Club Dr. 32°45′46″N 79°58′21″W	James Island	
62	Isaac Jenkins Mikell House	Isaac Jenkins Mikell House	March 11, 2014 (#14000056)	94 Rutledge Ave. 32°46′51″N 79°56′31″W	Peninsula	
63	Clark Mills Studio	Clark Mills Studio	October 15, 1966 (#66000703)	51 Broad St. 32°46′34″N 79°55′48″W	Peninsula	A studio of the self-taught sculptor Clark Mills on Broad Street.
64	Robert Mills Manor	Robert Mills Manor	September 24, 2021 (#100006991)	Bounded by Queen, Smith, and Logan Sts.; Including Cromwell Alley, Wilson St., and portions of Franklin St. 32°46′40″N 79°56′15″W		
65	Andrew B. Murray Vocational School	Andrew B. Murray Vocational School	May 30, 2002 (#02000569)	3 Chisolm St. 32°46′26″N 79°56′33″W	Peninsula	
66	James Nicholson House	James Nicholson House	August 30, 1974 (#74001832)	172 Rutledge Ave. 32°47′12″N 79°56′44″W	Peninsula	
67	Old Bethel United Methodist Church	Old Bethel United Methodist Church	April 21, 1975 (#75001693)	222 Calhoun St. 32°47′03″N 79°56′33″W	Peninsula	
68	Old Marine Hospital	Old Marine Hospital	November 7, 1973 (#73001690)	20 Franklin St. 32°46′40″N 79°56′14″W	Peninsula	
69	Old Slave Mart	Old Slave Mart	May 2, 1975 (#75001694)	6 Chalmers St. 32°46′38″N 79°55′48″W	Peninsula	
70	Porter Military Academy	Porter Military Academy	June 21, 1996 (#96000685)	175-181 Ashley Ave. 32°47′12″N 79°56′52″W	Peninsula	
71	Powder Magazine	Powder Magazine	January 5, 1972 (#72001200)	79 Cumberland St. 32°46′45″N 79°55′51″W	Peninsula	
72	Presqui'ile	Presqui'ile	December 8, 1978 (#78002503)	2 Amherst St. 32°47′43″N 79°56′00″W	Peninsula	
73	Read Building	Read Building	October 11, 2022 (#100008253)	593 King St. 32°47′34″N 79°56′29″W	Peninsula	
74	Robert Barnwell Rhett House	Robert Barnwell Rhett House	November 7, 1973 (#73001691)	6 Thomas St. 32°47′10″N 79°56′33″W	Peninsula	
75	William Robb House	William Robb House	September 8, 1983 (#83002186)	12 Bee St. 32°47′14″N 79°56′50″W	Peninsula	
76	Robert William Roper House	Robert William Roper House	November 7, 1973 (#73001692)	9 E. Battery St. 32°46′15″N 79°55′43″W	Peninsula	
77	Thomas Rose House	Thomas Rose House	October 15, 1970 (#70000892)	57-59 Church St. 32°46′24″N 79°55′46″W	Peninsula	
78	Nathaniel Russell House	Nathaniel Russell House	August 19, 1971 (#71000750)	51 Meeting St. 32°46′26″N 79°55′53″W	Peninsula	
79	Edward Rutledge House	Edward Rutledge House	November 11, 1971 (#71000751)	117 Broad St. 32°46′34″N 79°56′02″W	Peninsula	
80	Gov. John Rutledge House	Gov. John Rutledge House	November 7, 1971 (#71000752)	116 Broad St. 32°46′34″N 79°56′01″W	Peninsula	
81	Old St. Andrew's Parish Church	Old St. Andrew's Parish Church	October 15, 1973 (#73001694)	5 miles northwest of Charleston on South Carolina Highway 61; 32°50′19″N 80°02′57″W	West Ashley	
82	St. Mark's Episcopal Church		January 23, 2026 (#100012609)	16 Thomas Street; 32°47′13″N 79°56′34″W		
83	St. Mary's Roman Catholic Church	St. Mary's Roman Catholic Church	November 7, 1976 (#76001697)	93 Hasell St. 32°46′54″N 79°55′58″W	Peninsula	
84	St. Michael's Episcopal Church	St. Michael's Episcopal Church	October 15, 1966 (#66000704)	80 Meeting St. 32°46′34″N 79°55′51″W	Peninsula	
85	St. Philip's Episcopal Church	St. Philip's Episcopal Church	November 7, 1973 (#73001695)	146 Church St. 32°46′45″N 79°55′45″W	Peninsula	
86	Secessionville Historic District	Secessionville Historic District	October 1, 1979 (#79002378)	North of Folly Beach; 32°42′18″N 79°56′35″W	James Island	Extends into Folly Beach, elsewhere in Charleston County
87	James Stocker Simmons House	James Stocker Simmons House	January 14, 2022 (#100006553)	122 Rutledge Ave. 32°46′59″N 79°56′37″W		
88	Simmons-Edwards House	Simmons-Edwards House	January 25, 1971 (#71000753)	12-14 Legare St. 32°46′21″N 79°56′03″W	Peninsula	
89	Philip Simmons House & Workshop and Rosetta Simmons Residence		September 30, 2026 (#100013446)	30 and 30 ½ Blake Street; 32°47′53″N 79°56′12″W		
90	Site of Old Charles Towne	Site of Old Charles Towne	December 17, 1969 (#69000162)	Albemarle Point; 32°48′27″N 79°59′13″W	West Ashley	Now part of a state historic site
91	Sixth Naval District Training Aids Library	Sixth Naval District Training Aids Library	October 16, 2017 (#100001747)	1056 King St. 32°48′18″N 79°57′03″W		
92	Giovanni Sottile House	Giovanni Sottile House	April 30, 2019 (#100003690)	81 Rutledge Ave. 32°46′48″N 79°56′31″W		
93	South Carolina National Bank of Charleston	South Carolina National Bank of Charleston	June 4, 1973 (#73001693)	16 Broad St. 32°46′37″N 79°55′39″W	Peninsula	
94	South Carolina State Arsenal	South Carolina State Arsenal	July 16, 1970 (#70000577)	2 Tobacco Street, Marion Square; 32°47′14″N 79°56′11″W	Peninsula	
95	James Sparrow House	James Sparrow House	January 30, 1998 (#98000045)	65 Cannon St. 32°47′20″N 79°56′42″W	Peninsula	
96	Spring Street Methodist Church		October 8, 2024 (#100010910)	68 Spring St. 32°47′31″N 79°56′38″W		
97	Standard Oil Company Headquarters	Standard Oil Company Headquarters	February 3, 2015 (#14001243)	1600 Meeting St. 32°49′18″N 79°57′05″W		
98	Stiles-Hinson House	Stiles-Hinson House	October 9, 1974 (#74001833)	940 Paul Revere Dr. 32°45′06″N 79°55′45″W	James Island	
99	Col. John Stuart House	Col. John Stuart House	October 22, 1970 (#70000578)	104-106 Tradd St. 32°46′27″N 79°56′01″W	Peninsula	
100	Sword Gate House	Sword Gate House	December 18, 1970 (#70000579)	32 Legare St. and 111 Tradd St. 32°46′25″N 79°56′03″W	Peninsula	
101	Josiah Smith Tennent House	Josiah Smith Tennent House	November 27, 1979 (#79002377)	729 E. Bay St. 32°47′55″N 79°56′06″W	Peninsula	
102	U.S. Customhouse	U.S. Customhouse	October 9, 1974 (#74001834)	200 E. Bay St. 32°46′50″N 79°55′37″W	Peninsula	
103	U.S. Post Office and Courthouse	U.S. Post Office and Courthouse	August 13, 1974 (#74001835)	83 Broad Street; 32°46′33″N 79°55′54″W	Peninsula	
104	Unitarian Church	Unitarian Church	November 7, 1973 (#73001696)	6 Archdale St. 32°46′20″N 79°56′02″W	Peninsula	
105	Unnamed Battery		August 11, 1982 (#82003846)	St. Andrew; 32°48′07″N 80°03′14″W	West Ashley	
106	Denmark Vesey House	Denmark Vesey House	May 11, 1976 (#76001698)	56 Bull St. 32°46′56″N 79°56′28″W	Peninsula	
107	Wehaken		January 16, 2026 (#100012567)	1400 Old Towne Road; 32°48′26″N 79°59′46″W		
108	West Point Rice Mill	West Point Rice Mill	January 20, 1995 (#94001569)	Junction of Lockwood Dr. and Calhoun St. 32°46′44″N 79°57′04″W	Peninsula	

== Former listing ==
	Name on the Register	Image	Date listed	Date removed	Location	City or town	Description
1	Shaw Community Center		April 11, 1973 (#73002235)	October 1, 1974	22 Mary St.	Peninsula	Demolished to make way for new Boys & Girls Club building

== See also ==
- Timeline of Charleston, South Carolina
- List of National Historic Landmarks in South Carolina
- National Register of Historic Places listings in South Carolina
