= Trenholm =

Trenholm may refer to:

== People ==
- Trenholm (surname), including a list of persons with the surname
- Frank Trenholm Coffyn (1878–1960), American aviator

== Places ==
- Fort Trenholm, a historic (1864) artillery battery located at Johns Island, Charleston, South Carolina
- H. Councill Trenholm State Community College, Montgomery, Alabama
- Trenholm, Virginia, an unincorporated community in Powhatan County
- Trenholm, one of two islands comprising Cape Jourimain
- Trenholm Point, an ice-covered point northwest of Eldred Point on the coast of Marie Byrd Land
