= Sparrow House =

Sparrow House may refer to:

- Sparrow House (Portland, Maine), listed on the National Register of Historic Places in Portland, Maine
- Richard Sparrow House, Plymouth, Massachusetts, listed on the NRHP in Plymouth County, Massachusetts
- James Sparrow House, Charleston, South Carolina, listed on the National Register of Historic Places in Charleston, South Carolina
- Sparrow House (Montreal), a residence in the Îlot-Trafalgar-Gleneagles historic block in Montreal
