= Clark Mills Studio =

Clark Mills first sculpture studio, Charleston, SC (1837-1848)

- U.S. National Register of Historic Places
- U.S. National Historic Landmark
- U.S. National Historic Landmark District – Contributing property
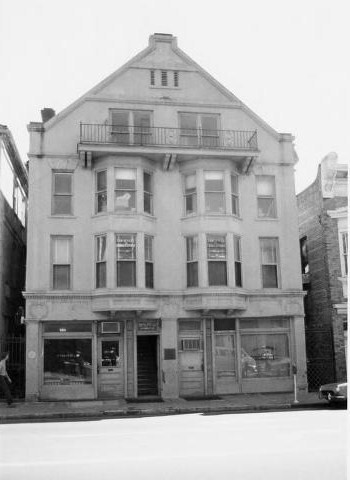
- Clark Mills Studio

- Location within South Carolina Location within the United States
- Location: 51 Broad St., Charleston, South Carolina
- Coordinates: 32°46′33.89″N 79°55′47.66″W
- Part of: Charleston Historic District (ID66000964)
- NRHP reference No.: 66000703

Significant dates
- Added to NRHP: October 15, 1966
- Designated NHL: December 21, 1965
- Designated NHLDCP: October 9, 1960

The Charleston, South Carolina, studio of sculptor Clark Mills (December 13, 1810 – January 12, 1883), was his first—he worked there from 1837 to 1848, when he moved to Washington, DC. The Charleston studio was designated as a National Historic Landmark in 1965. Before it became Mills' studio, the building, located at 51 Broad Street, Charleston originally served as a tenement house, and now houses professional offices.

In 1848, Mills moved his studio and residence from Charleston to Washington, D.C., when he won a major contract to cast the equestrian bronze statue of Andrew Jackson—now in Lafayette Square, Washington, D.C., which made his name and foundry famous. With the success of the 1852 Andrew Jackson sculpture, Mills studio was awarded other major contracts, created in Clark Mills Studio and Foundry in Bladensburg Road, Maryland, eight miles from the Capital in Washington.

== Mills Charlston studio (1837 – 1848) ==
The former Mills Studio building is located Charleston's old city, on the south side of Broad Street just west of Church Street. It is a four-story masonry structure, built out of stuccoed brick. Its front facade is now commercial, with store fronts on the ground floor, projecting bay windows on the second and third floors. The interior is also reflective of its modern uses, having been converted into professional offices around the turn of the 20th century. The building was originally built as a tenement house, and had two tenants in the 1830s, one of whom, Erastus Bulkeley, maintained a yard nearby from which he sold marble. When the other tenant moved out in 1837, Clark Mills rented that space, and established his residence and studio there.

It is believed that it is here that the self-taught Mills produced his first significant work, a marble bust of South Carolina politician John C. Calhoun.

The Broad Street building was assigned the National Historic Landmark designation on December 21, 1965, by the Office of Archeology and Historic Preservation (OAHP). It was included in the National Register of Historic Places Inventory in 1976 under The Clark Mills Studio, and as Stoney and Stoney Law Office .

== Mills Studio and Foundry in Washington, D.C. (1848) ==
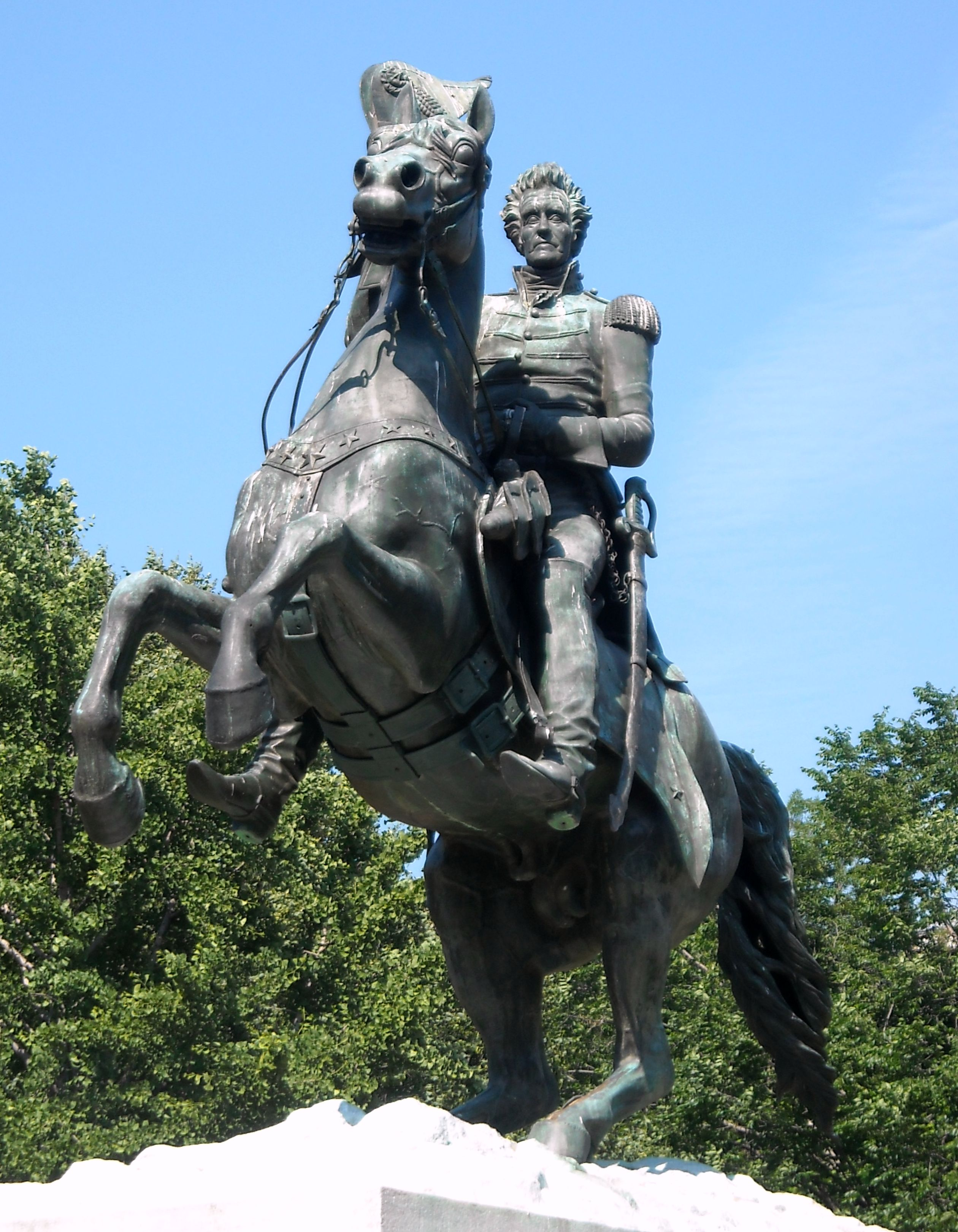
Equestrian statue of Andrew Jackson in Washington, D.C.

In 1848, Mills Foundry was selected by the Jackson Monument Committee to create an equestrian statue of Andrew Jackson. The memorial statue to Andrew Jackson is in Lafayette Square, near the White House in Washington, D.C.

For this contract Mills moved to Washington from Charleston, bringing with him eleven slaves including the master craftsman, Philip Reid, who had become Mills' apprentice. They erected a temporary foundry south of the White House for the casting. According to the Smithsonian's James M. Goode, Mills with the assistance of his apprentice, Reid and laborers, produced six castings of the equestrian statue. When the bronze casting was completed in 1852, it was considered to be the "first bronze statue ever cast in America", according to The Architect of the Capitol . They had made it through "trial and error" making its "accomplishment" quite extraordinary—none of the workers, including Mills had any formal training. It has been described as the first equestrian statue made in America, and possibly the first equestrian statue of a horse rearing on two legs in which no additional support was added.

== See also ==
- List of National Historic Landmarks in South Carolina
- National Register of Historic Places listings in Charleston, South Carolina
