= William Blacklock House =

Historic house in South Carolina, United States

- U.S. National Register of Historic Places
- U.S. National Historic Landmark
- U.S. National Historic Landmark District – Contributing property
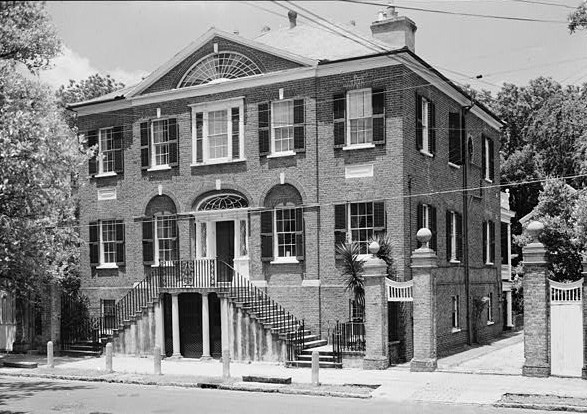
- William Blacklock House

- Location within South Carolina Location within the United States
- Location: 18 Bull St., Charleston, South Carolina
- Coordinates: 32°47′0″N 79°56′22″W
- Built: 1800
- Architectural style: Federal
- Part of: Charleston Historic District (ID66000964)
- NRHP reference No.: 73001681

Significant dates
- Added to NRHP: November 7, 1973
- Designated NHL: November 7, 1973
- Designated NHLDCP: October 9, 1960

The William Blacklock House is a historic house at 18 Bull Street in Charleston, South Carolina. A National Historic Landmark, this brick house, built in 1800 for a wealthy merchant, is one of the nation's finest examples of Adamesque architecture. It is now owned by the College of Charleston, housing its Office of the foundation.

== Description and history ==
The Blacklock House is set on the southern edge of the College of Charleston campus in central Charleston, on the north side of Bull Street. The house is a two-story brick house, set on a high brick basement. Its roof is hipped, with a gable above the center entrance. The entrance is reached by a double flight of stairs with iron railings, and is flanked by sidelight windows, with a fanlight window above. The windows in the bays on either side of the entrance have round-arch tops, while the remaining windows have flat lintels with keystones. The window above the door is a larger window with sidelights, and the gable above has a large fanlight lunette in it. The property includes two outbuildings, each of which have Gothic Revival features.

The house was built by William Blacklock who, on September 24, 1794, purchased two lots in the newly laid out Harleston Village. Although likely built in 1800, Blacklock was first listed as living in the house in 1802 according to a city directory (based on the prior year's information). The house's design has similarities to the work of Gabriel Manigault, but no attribution has ever been confirmed. Blacklock was a member of the committee responsible for the construction of a bank (now City Hall) which was designed by Manigault in the same year. Other design elements of 18 Bull St. are similar to those uses in other Manigault designs.

The house underwent a major restoration in 1937, and was acquired by the College of Charleston in 1974. It was declared a National Historic Landmark in 1973.

== See also ==
- List of National Historic Landmarks in South Carolina
- National Register of Historic Places listings in Charleston, South Carolina
