= Dubose Heyward House =

Historic house in South Carolina, United States

- U.S. National Register of Historic Places
- U.S. National Historic Landmark
- U.S. National Historic Landmark District – Contributing property
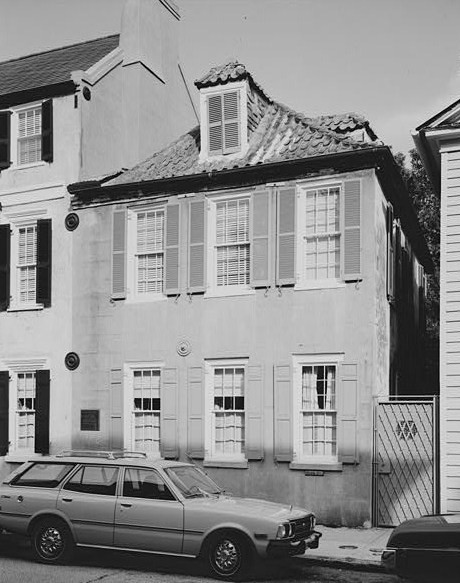
- 76 Church Street, Charleston, South Carolina

- Location within South Carolina Location within the United States
- Location: 76 Church St., Charleston, South Carolina
- Coordinates: 32°46′26″N 79°55′44″W
- Built: 1919
- Part of: Charleston Historic District (ID66000964)
- NRHP reference No.: 71000749

Significant dates
- Added to NRHP: November 11, 1971
- Designated NHL: November 11, 1971
- Designated NHLDCP: October 9, 1960

The Dubose Heyward House is a historic house at 76 Church Street in Charleston, South Carolina. Now a wing of a larger house, this modest two-story structure was the home from 1919 to 1924 of author Dubose Heyward (1885–1940), author of Porgy, one of the first works to portray Southern African-Americans in a positive light. The house was declared a National Historic Landmark in 1971.

== Description and history ==
The Heyward House is located in the Charleston Historic District, on the east side of Church Street south of Trade Street. It is a two-story structure, with a tile roof and stuccoed exterior. It is now attached as a wing to the house immediately to its left, a three-story building. The house is not architecturally distinguished, and has principally been modified since the period of Heyward's residence by the removal of intervening walls with the adjacent house to create enlarged dining and bedrooms.

Dubose Heyward was born in 1885 into an aristocratic Charleston family, which fell upon hard times, leading him to engage in a number of low-wage jobs early in life. He was a significant early figure in the renaissance of Southern literature in the 1910s, helping found the Poetry Society of South Carolina in 1920. In 1925 he moved to North Carolina, where he wrote Porgy, his most significant claim to fame. It was unique at the time in present a southern African-American in a well-rounded and human light, and not as either a comic foil or propaganda piece. Porgy was the inspiration for George Gershwin's popular folk opera Porgy and Bess, cementing the character's place in American culture. Heyward lived in this house between about 1919 and 1924.

== See also ==
- List of National Historic Landmarks in South Carolina
- National Register of Historic Places listings in Charleston, South Carolina
