= Standard Oil Company Headquarters =

- U.S. National Register of Historic Places
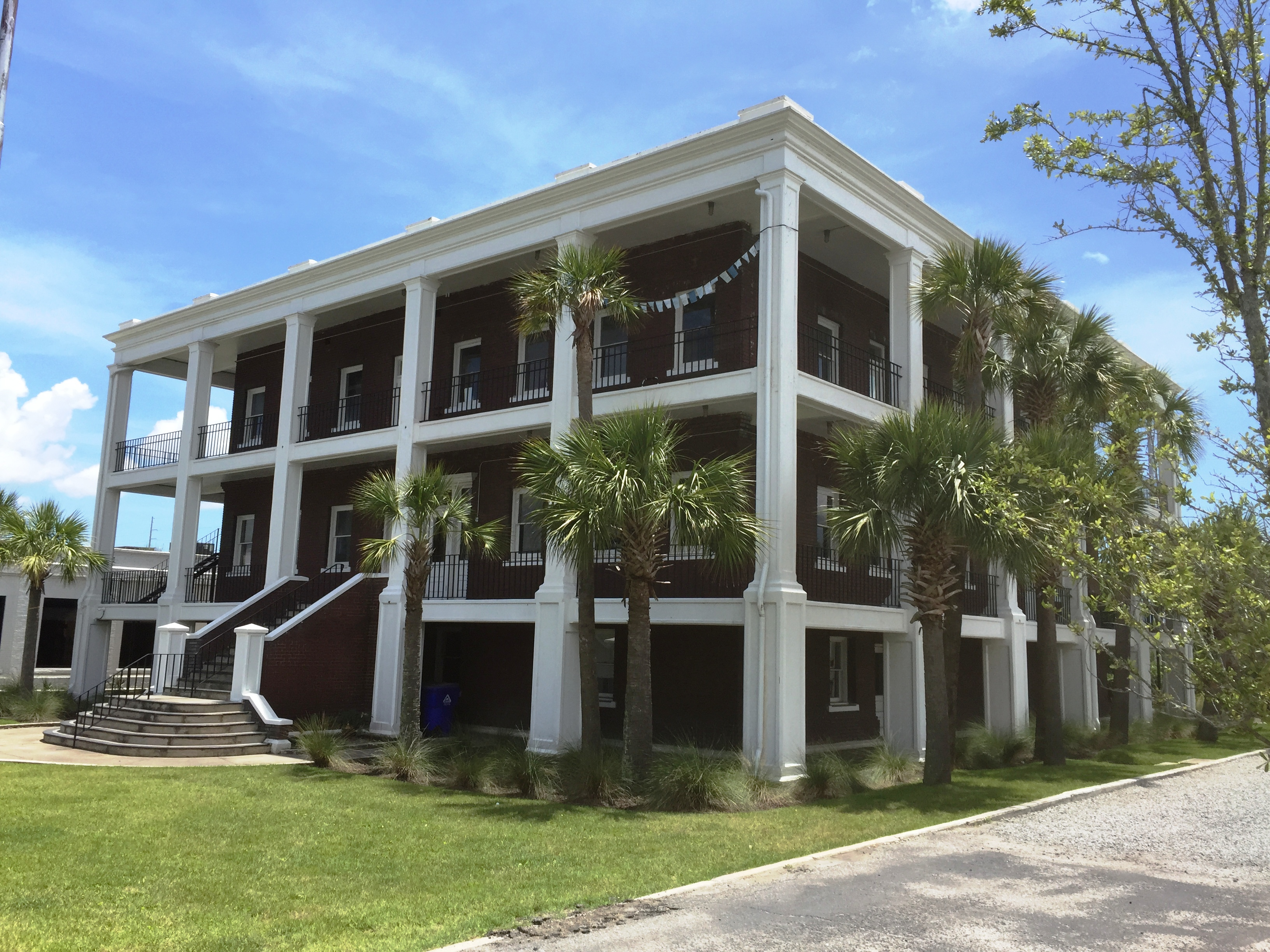

- Location within South Carolina Location within the United States
- Location: 1600 Meeting St., Charleston, South Carolina
- Coordinates: 32°49′18″N 79°57′5″W
- Area: 2.4 acres (0.97 ha)
- Built: 1926
- NRHP reference No.: 14001243
- Added to NRHP: February 3, 2015

The Standard Oil Company Headquarters are a cluster of historic commercial buildings at 1600 Meeting Street in Charleston, South Carolina. The main building is a distinctive commercial take on Charleston's residential architecture, with a two-story porch wrapping around its north and west sides. The three buildings were built in 1926 for the Standard Oil Company of New Jersey, housing management and other facilities associated with the adjacent Charleston Refinery.

The complex was listed on the National Register of Historic Places in 2015.

== See also ==
- National Register of Historic Places listings in Charleston, South Carolina
