= Unnamed Battery =

- U.S. National Register of Historic Places
- Location within South Carolina Location within the United States
- Location: Shaftsbury Townhouses, St. Andrew’s Parish, West Ashley, Charleston, South Carolina
- Coordinates: 32°48′7″N 80°3′14″W
- Area: 1 acre (0.40 ha)
- Built: 1862
- MPS: Civil War Defenses of Charleston TR
- NRHP reference No.: 82003846
- Added to NRHP: August 11, 1982

Unnamed Battery is an historic artillery battery located at West Ashley, Charleston, South Carolina. It was built in 1862, to protect the exterior western lines running from the Stono River on the south to the Ashley River at Bee's Ferry. It has emplacements for two guns. It measures approximately 160 feet by 160 feet with a 10-foot parapet and a 15-foot powder magazine.

It was listed on the National Register of Historic Places in 1982.
