= Battery No. 1 =

- U.S. National Register of Historic Places
- Location within South Carolina Location within the United States
- Location: Riverland Dr., James Island, Charleston, South Carolina
- Coordinates: 32°42′52″N 79°58′42″W
- Area: 16.5 acres (6.7 ha)
- Built: 1863
- MPS: Civil War Defenses of Charleston TR
- NRHP reference No.: 82004787
- Added to NRHP: August 11, 1982

Battery No. 1 is a historic artillery battery located at James Island, Charleston, South Carolina. It was built in 1863, as part of the James Island Siege Line. At the close of the war it was armed with five pieces of artillery. The earthen redoubt's right face is about 240 feet, the center face approximately 160 feet, and the left face 280 feet in length. It has a 15-foot-high parapet wall and a 20-foot-high powder magazine.

It was listed on the National Register of Historic Places in 1982.
