= Equestrian statue of Andrew Jackson (Washington, D.C.) =

Equestrian statue by Clark Mills in Washington, D.C., U.S.

Andrew Jackson
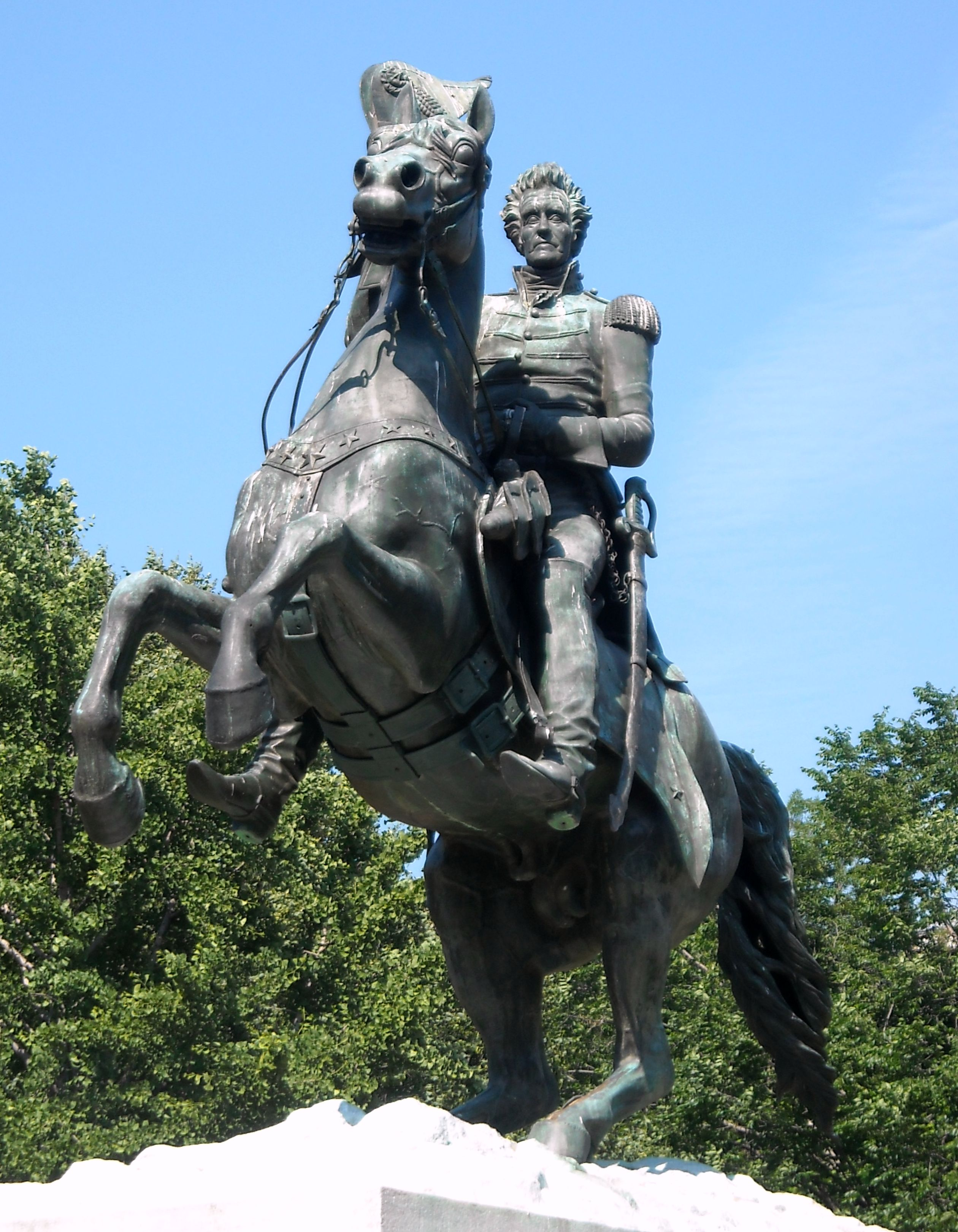
- Statue in 2008
- Artist: Clark Mills
- Year: 1852; 174 years ago
- Type: Bronze
- Dimensions: 2.4 m × 3.7 m (8 ft × 12 ft)
- Location: Washington, D.C., United States; 38°53′58.3″N 77°02′11.6″W
- Owner: National Park Service

Andrew Jackson is a bronze equestrian statue by Clark Mills mounted on a white marble base in the center of Lafayette Square within President's Park in Washington, D.C., just to the north of the White House. Jackson is depicted dressed in military uniform, raising his hat with his right hand, while controlling the reins with his left hand as his horse rises on its rear legs.

Other original castings stand in Jackson Square in New Orleans, Louisiana, and at the Tennessee State Capitol building in Nashville, Tennessee.

== Description ==
The statue depicts Andrew Jackson, the general who commanded US forces in the Battle of New Orleans on January 8, 1815, and who served as the seventh president of the United States from 1829 to 1837. It was commissioned in May 1847, almost two years after Jackson's death at The Hermitage, his plantation near Nashville, Tennessee, by the Jackson Monument Committee chaired by John Peter Van Ness, who died before the statue was completed. Although Mills had never met Jackson and had never seen an equestrian statue, his proposal won the commission ahead of Hiram Powers and Robert Mills. Mills taught himself the technical skills to finalize the design and cast the statue.

Jackson's horse at the Battle of New Orleans was named Duke. Mills modeled the horse on his own horse, named Olympus. Mills trained his horse to pose on its haunches. He also borrowed Jackson's uniform from the U.S. Patent Office, where it was being preserved. He completed a plaster model, and he established a new bronze foundry to produce the casting at his studio on 15th Street and Pennsylvania Avenue NW, south of the Treasury Building.

Mills produced six castings of the statue of Andrew Jackson until the final one was completed, with ten pieces, six for Jackson and four for the horse. In his casting, he was assisted by an enslaved apprentice, Phillip Reid, who also assisted Mills with other castings, including the 1860-1862 casting of the Statue of Freedom designed by Thomas Crawford which sits atop the United States Capitol dome. The casting was completed 1852, making this the first equestrian statue made in the US, and also the first bronze statue cast in the US.

It has been described as the first equestrian statue made with the horse rearing on two legs with no additional support – earlier equestrian bronzes, such as Pietro Tacca's statue of Philip IV, and Étienne Maurice Falconet's statue of Peter the Great, use the horse's tail as a third support. Tests in 1993 showed that the rear legs have central cores of iron covered with bronze, giving them additional strength and weight to support and counterbalance the suspended parts of the statue.

The statue is about a third larger than life, and weighs about 15 tons. It was installed on a tapering rectangular marble base on a raised circular grassed area with railings on the alignment of the North Portico of the White House and 16th Street NW. The narrow face of the marble base, to the west, bears the inscriptions "JACKSON" and "OUR FEDERAL UNION / IT MUST BE PRESERVED", the latter added in 1909 and quoting a toast offered by Jackson at a Democratic Party banquet in 1830 to celebrate the birthday of Thomas Jefferson. The south face has the inscription "CLARK MILLS".

The marble base is surrounded by four cannons that Jackson captured from the Spanish at Pensacola, Florida in 1818. The original intention was to cast the statue itself using metal from captured cannons, but the tin content was too high. The metal barrels of the cannons initially rested on the grass for several years, before they were raised on new wooden gun carriages, subsequently replaced several times.

== History ==
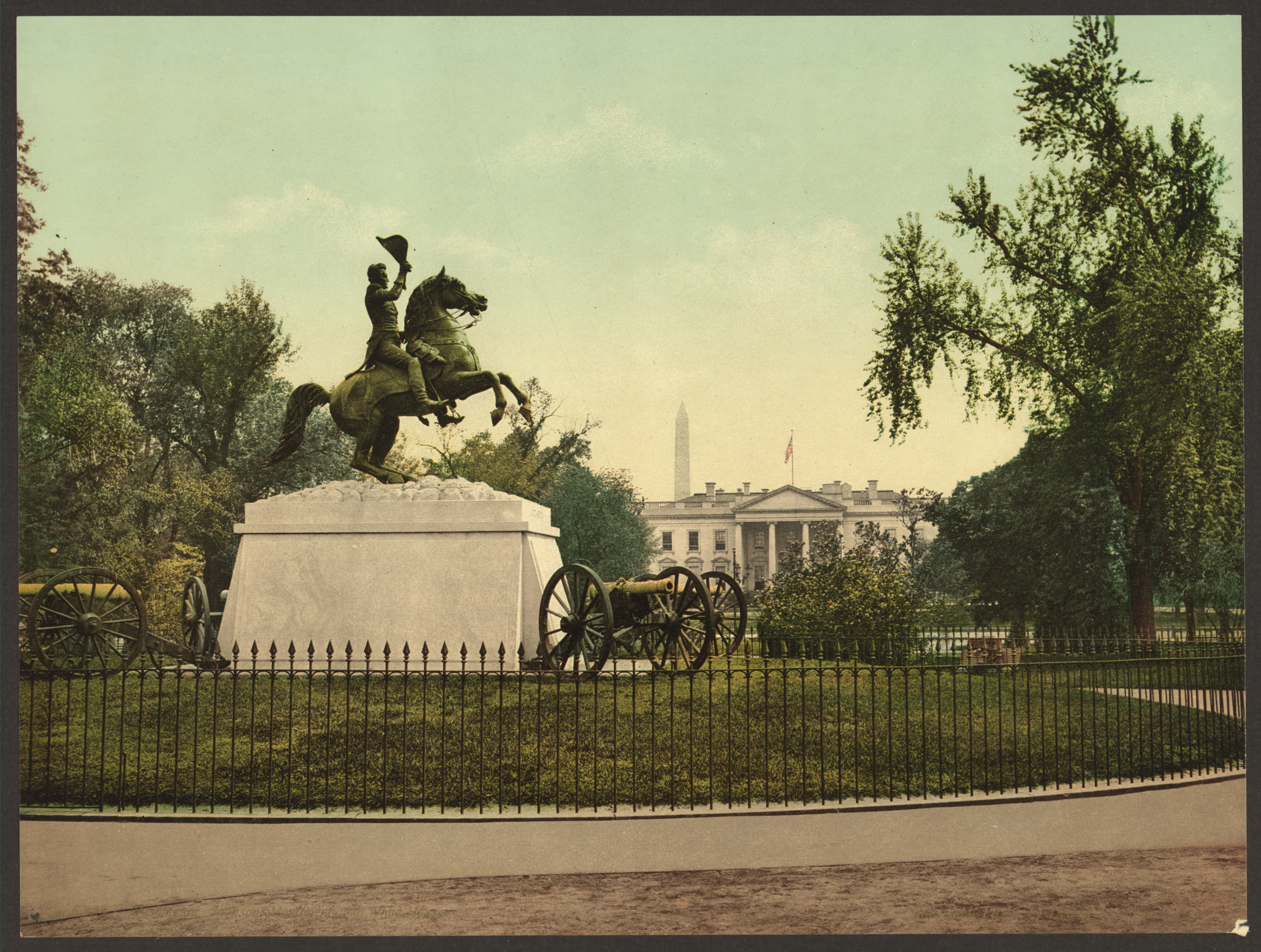
The Jackson Monument and White House in 1898 (photochrom print)

The statue was dedicated on January 8, 1853, the 38th anniversary of the Battle of New Orleans, with procession from Judiciary Square followed by an address delivered by Senator Stephen A. Douglas to a crowd of 20,000 people, including President Fillmore, Major General Winfield Scott, members of his cabinet and of Congress, the monument committee, and the sculptor. Cannons from the US Army fired a salute. Mills reputedly quelled concerns about the stability of the statue by throwing himself against the raised front legs of the horse at the dedication: it did not move.

Over time, the landscaping of the square has been simplified. Statues of figures from the American Revolutionary War have been added, one in each corner of the square. In 1891, a Statue of the Marquis de Lafayette, after whom the square is named, was erected in the south east corner. In 1902, working clockwise, a statue of Rochambeau was added. In 1910, statues of Von Steuben and Kościuszko were erected. The view from the White House is now framed by the bronze Navy Yard Urns, cast in the Washington Navy Yard and based on the ancient Medici Vase, each mounted on a marble plinth.

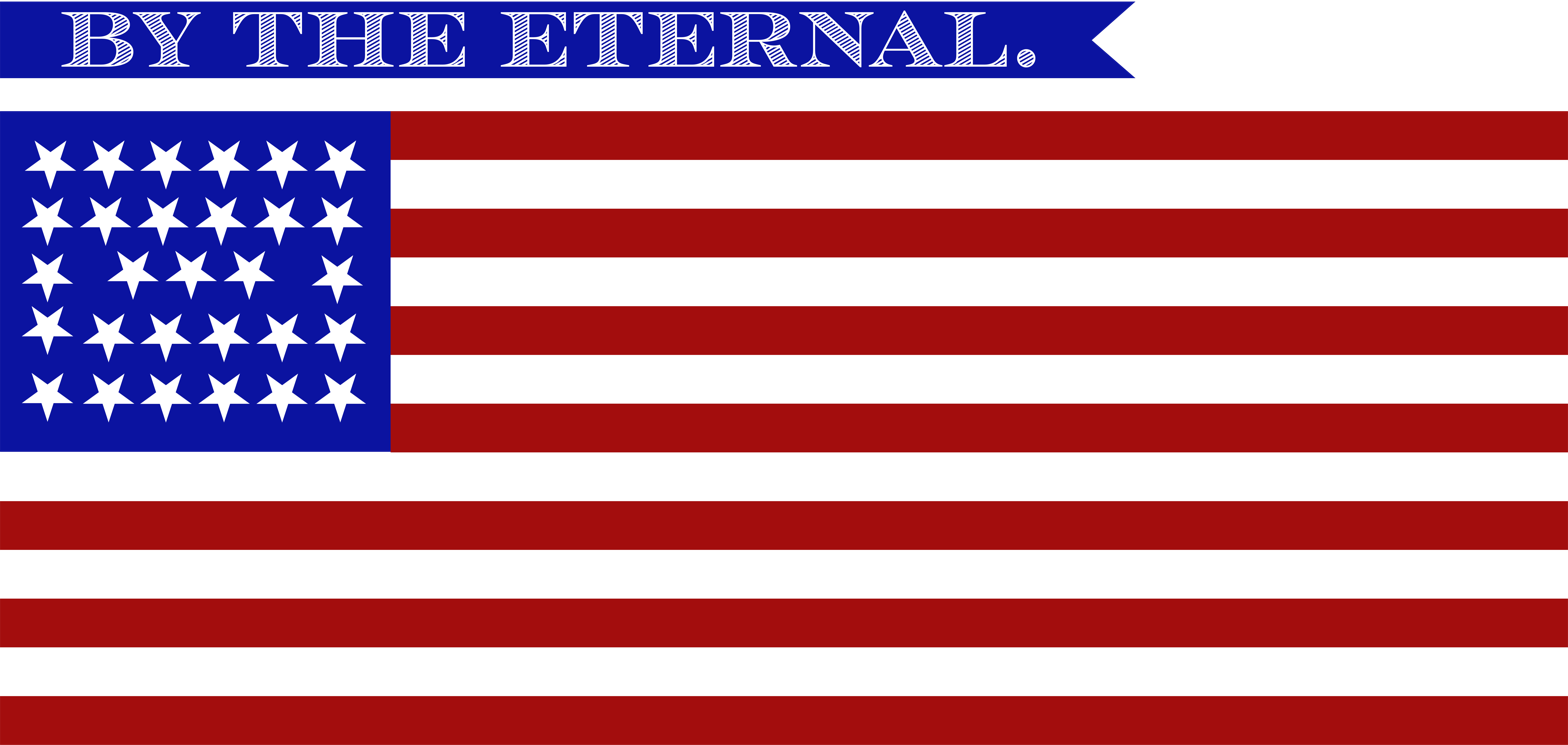
A digital reconstruction of the flag flown from the statue during the American Civil War

The statue of Jackson faced a bronze statue of Thomas Jefferson that was installed on the White House North Lawn in 1847, until Jefferson's statue was returned to the U.S Capitol in 1874. There have been proposals, particularly in the early 20th century, to move Jackson's statue and swap it with Mill's 1860 equestrian statue of George Washington in Washington Circle, to reunite Washington with the other the Revolutionary War generals in Lafayette Square, and give the statue of Andrew Jackson more space. These proposals have been resisted on the grounds of the historical importance of the statue of Andrew Jackson and the desire to keep it in its original location.

A crowd unsuccessfully attempted to topple the statue on June 22, 2020, during the George Floyd protests. Former U.S. Senator of Colorado, Ben Nighthorse Campbell, an American Indian, defended the monument, advocating for it to remain and called for the addition of plaques that, according to him, explained and focused on the complicated history of Andrew Jackson in his proposal.

Several days later, on June 27, the United States Department of Justice (DOJ) charged four men, including a 20-year-old George Washington University student, with the destruction of federal property for allegedly trying to bring down the statue. The Justice Department alleged that a videotape showed one of the men breaking off and destroying the wheels of the cannons located at the base of the statue as well as pulling on ropes when trying to bring down the statue.

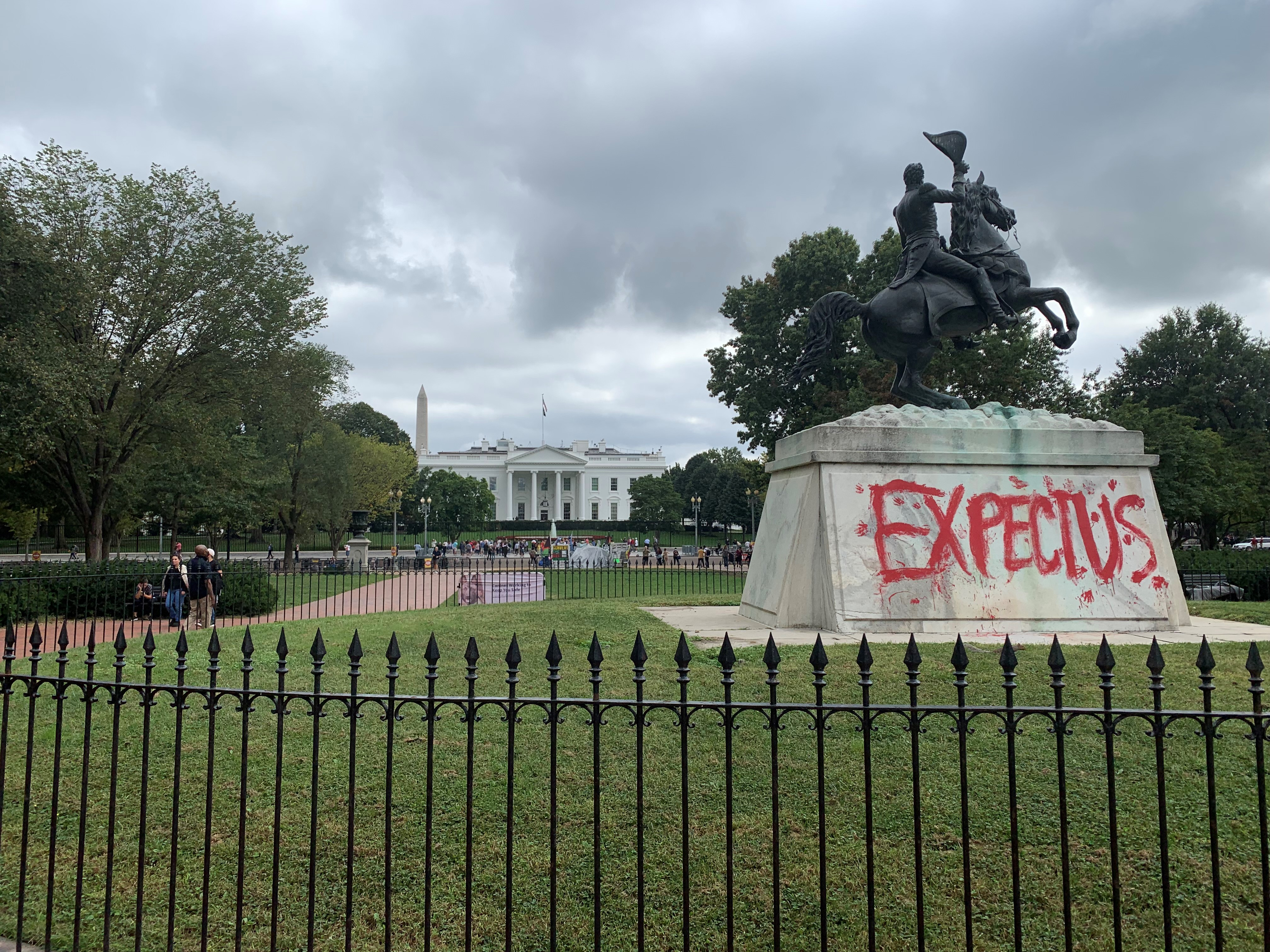
Jackson Monument after the removal of cannons at its base and Columbus Day vandalism, October 12, 2021

On July 2, 2020, the DOJ charged a fifth man, Jason Charter, with having unsuccessfully attempted to topple the statue on June 22. The DOJ alleged that Charter was seen on video climbing up onto the statue and affixing a rope that was then used to try to pull down the statue after participating in the destruction of the 1901 Albert Pike Memorial statue near Washington's Judiciary Square a few days earlier. In 2022, Charter was sentenced as part of a plea bargain to three years probation, 60 days home detention, $2600 of restitution, mental health treatment, and a drug evaluation, for his role in the incident.

The statute was vandalized with the words "Expect Us" on Columbus Day, Monday, October 11, 2021. Protestors had been chanting "respect us or expect us" in response to protesting against the Line 3 pipeline in Minnesota that runs through lands owned by American Indian tribes who were concerned that the pipeline could spill and ruin the land they use to farm.

== Other castings ==
Mills made two other castings of the statue. One was dedicated in February 1856 at Jackson Square in New Orleans, Louisiana.

A second was dedicated on May 20, 1880, on the Tennessee State Capitol grounds, in Nashville, Tennessee, commissioned by the Tennessee Historical Society to celebrate to city's centennial. Mills attended both dedications: the one in Nashville was his last public event before his death in 1883.

A third was dedicated in Jacksonville, Florida in 1987, near Jacksonville Landing. It was cast by the Modern Art Foundry of Long Island City, New York.

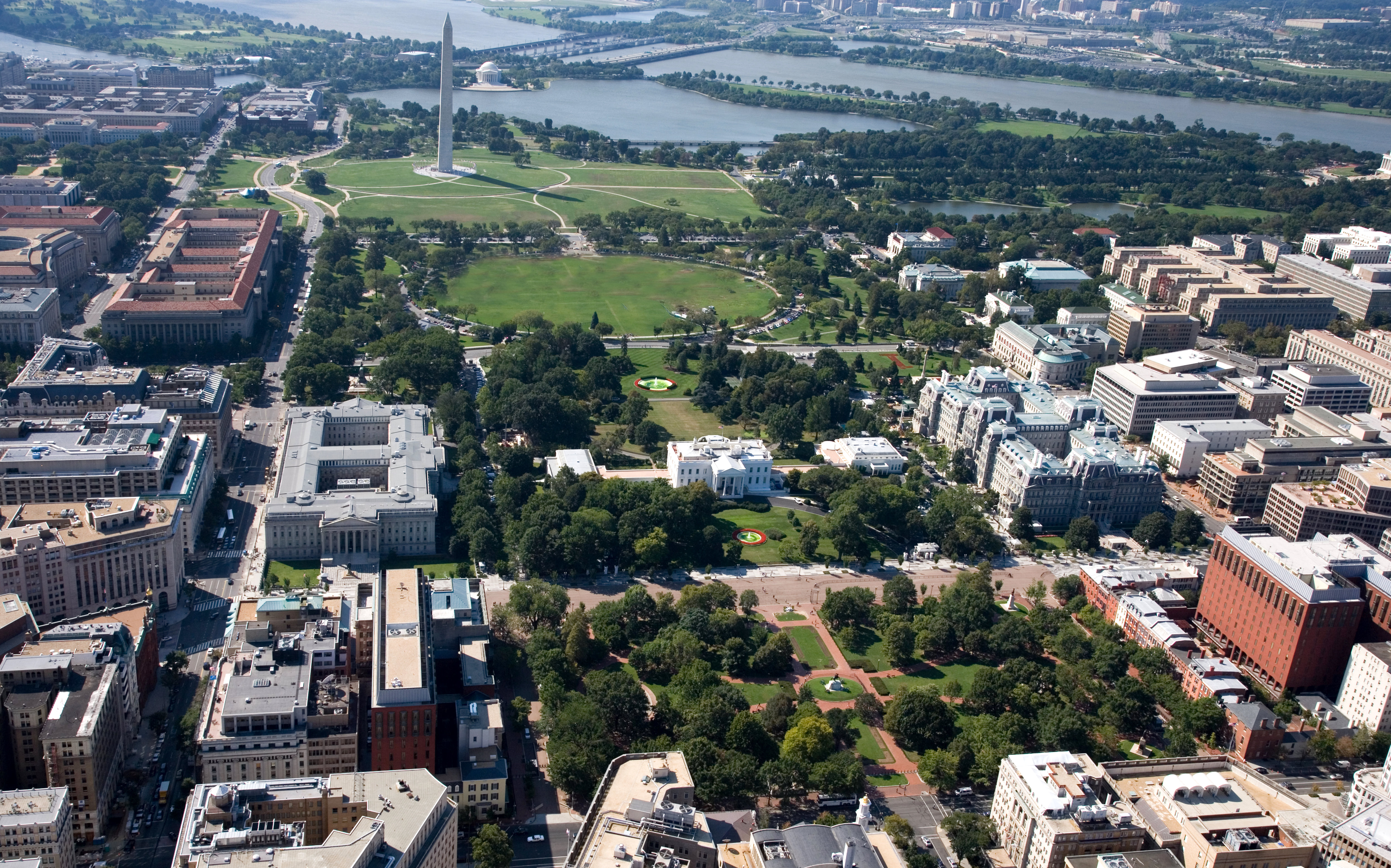
The original statue stands at the center of Lafayette Square, just to the north of the White House (2010)

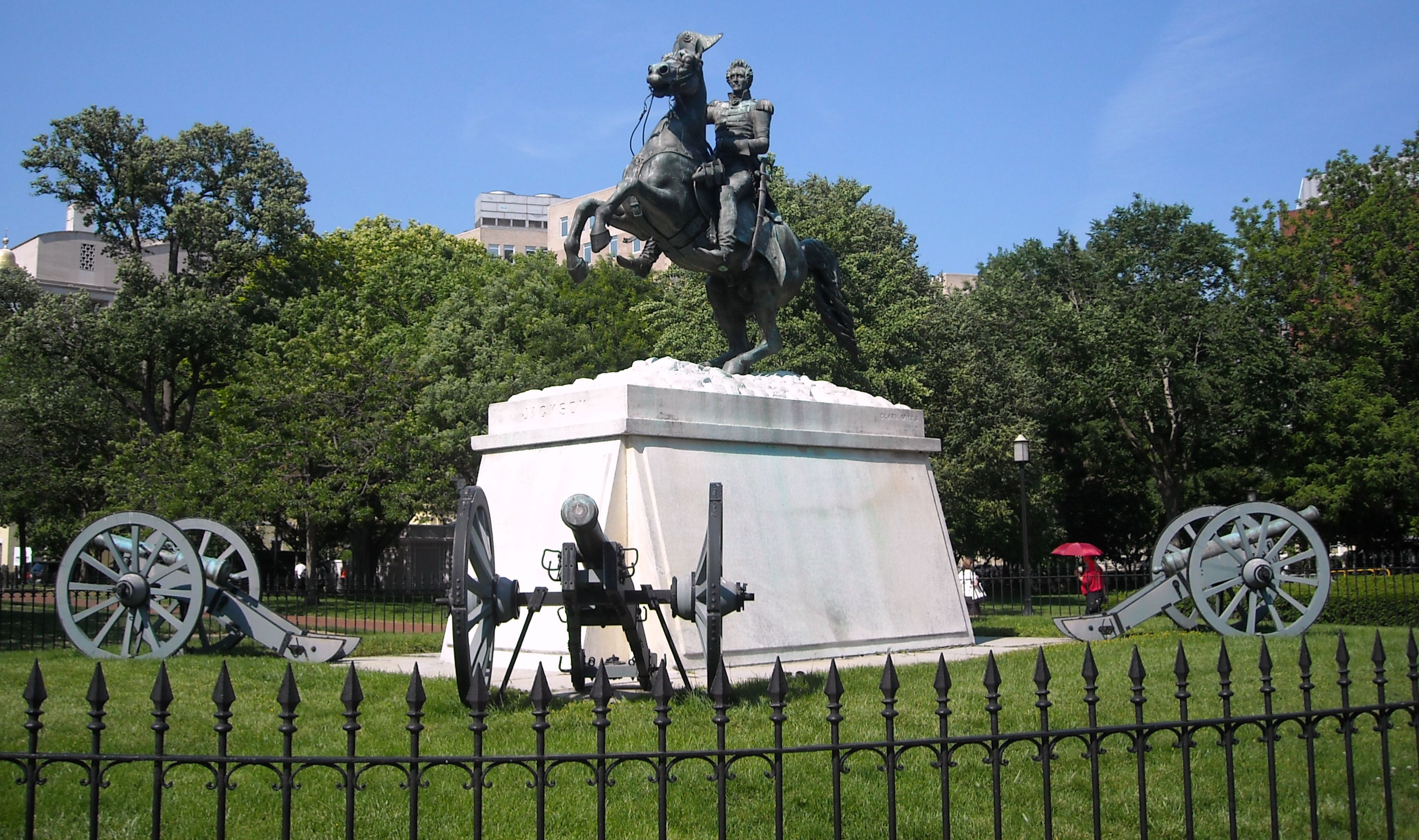
Statue in Washington, D.C. (2008)

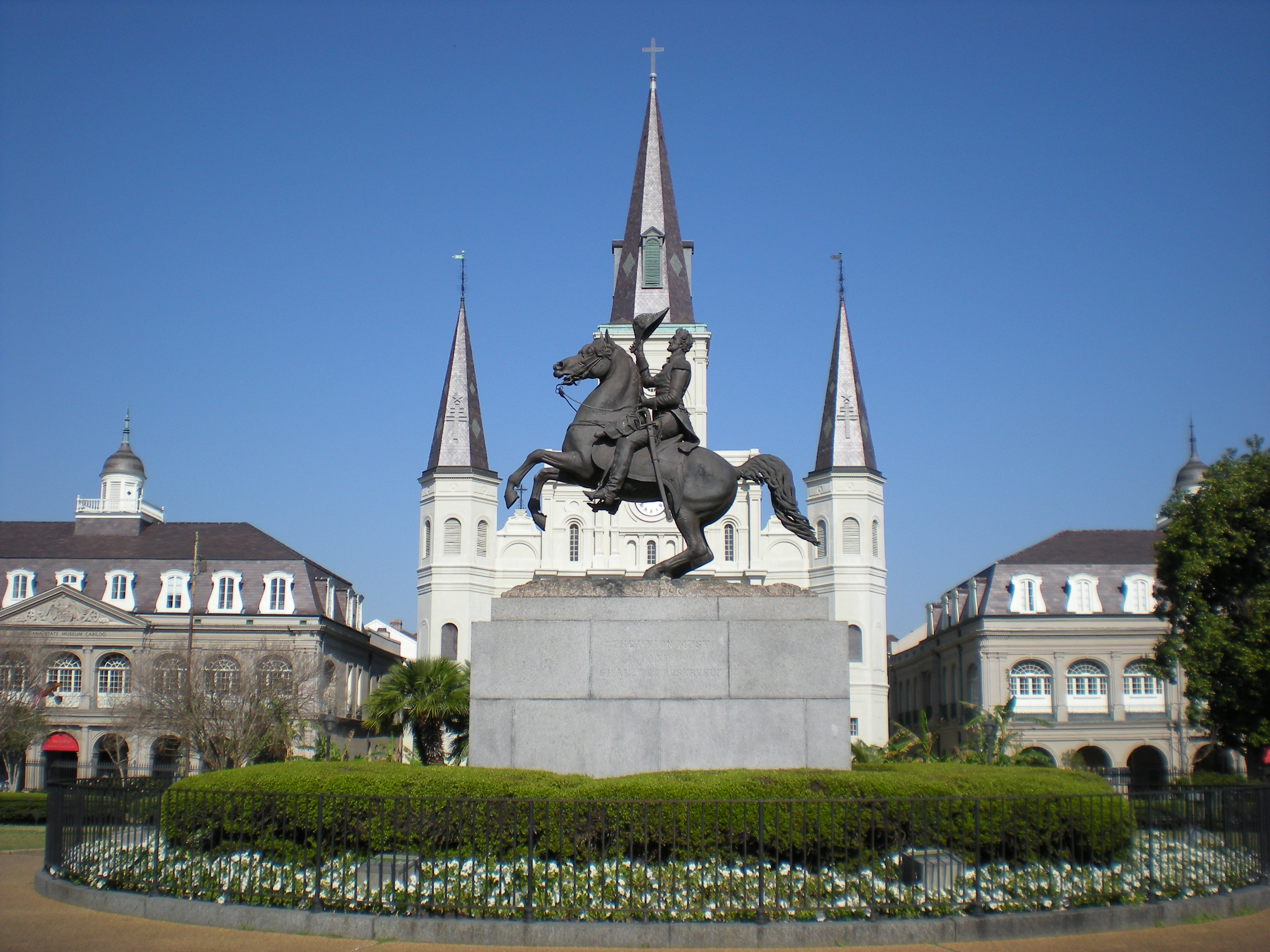
Statue in New Orleans, Louisiana (2009)

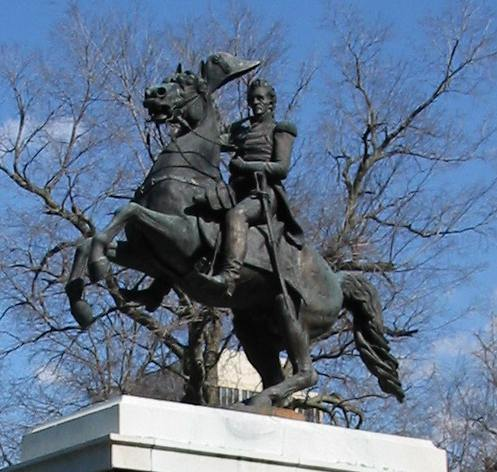
Statue in Nashville, Tennessee (2004)

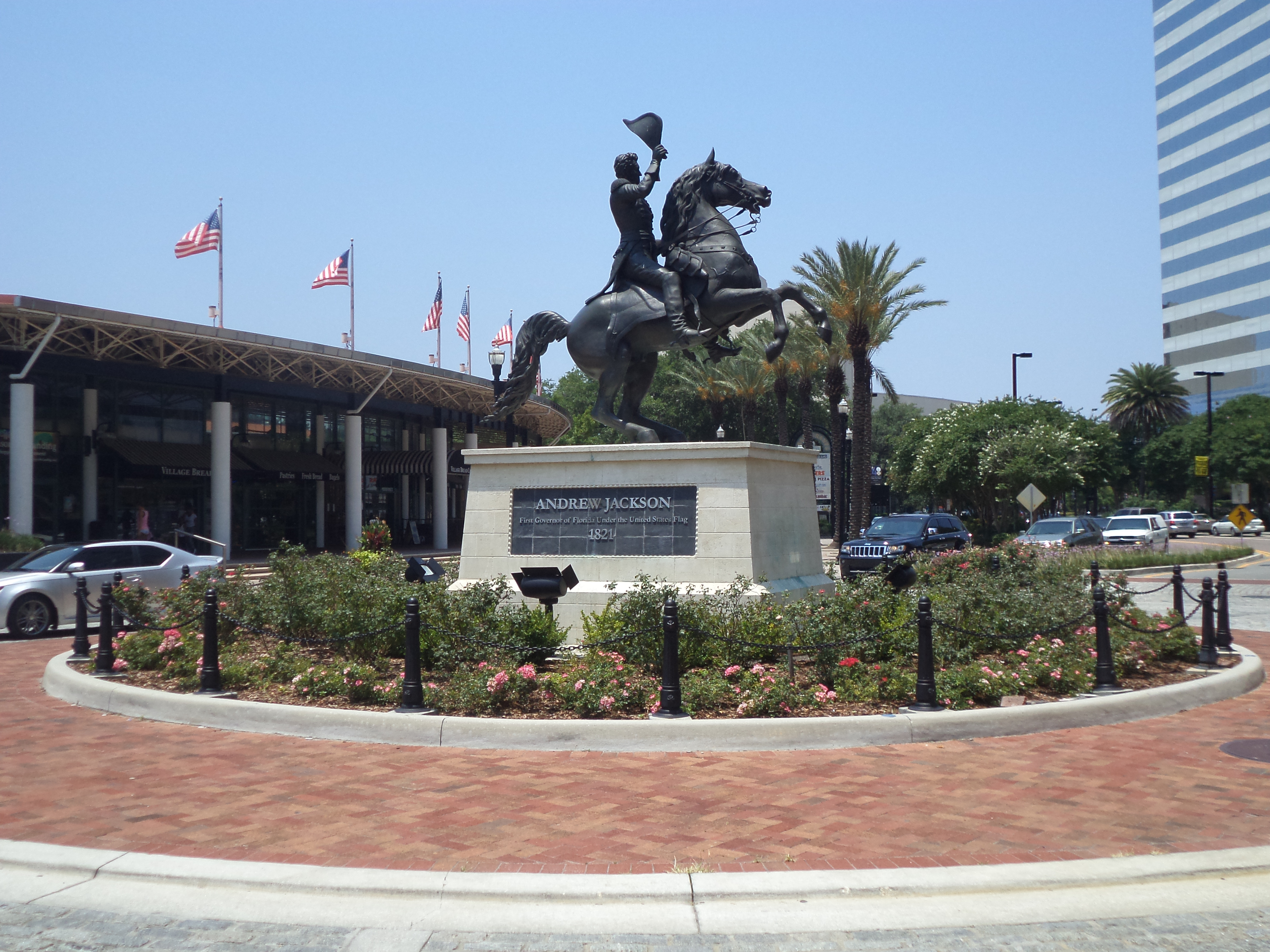
Statue in Jacksonville, Florida (2014)

== In Popular Culture ==
- The Statue was featured on the cover of an 1885 edition of Puck magazine.
- The New Orleans statue is featured in the Cold Open of an episode of Saturday Night Live in 1977, where Jimmy Carter (played by Dan Akroyd) is introduced sitting atop it.
- The Statue is the focal point of the 2010 Thriller novel Hell's Corner by David Baldacci, and is on the book's cover.

== See also ==
- Statue of Andrew Jackson (U.S. Capitol)
- List of public art in Washington, D.C., Ward 2
- List of sculptures of presidents of the United States
- Presidential memorials in the United States
- Horses of Andrew Jackson
