= Jonathan Lucas House =

Historic house in South Carolina, United States

- U.S. National Register of Historic Places
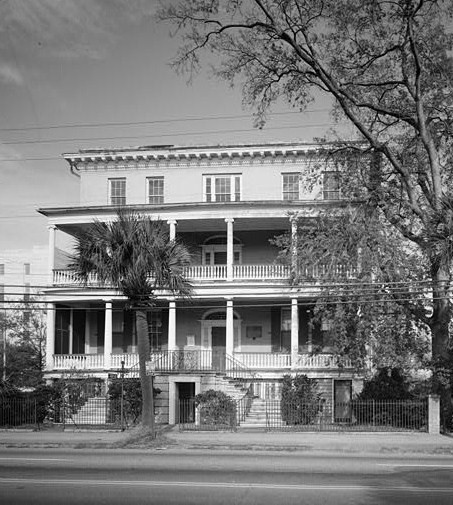

- Location within South Carolina Location within the United States
- Location: 286 Calhoun St., Charleston, South Carolina
- Coordinates: 32°46′57″N 79°56′54″W
- Built: By 1809
- Architectural style: Adamesque
- NRHP reference No.: 78002501
- Added to NRHP: February 23, 1978

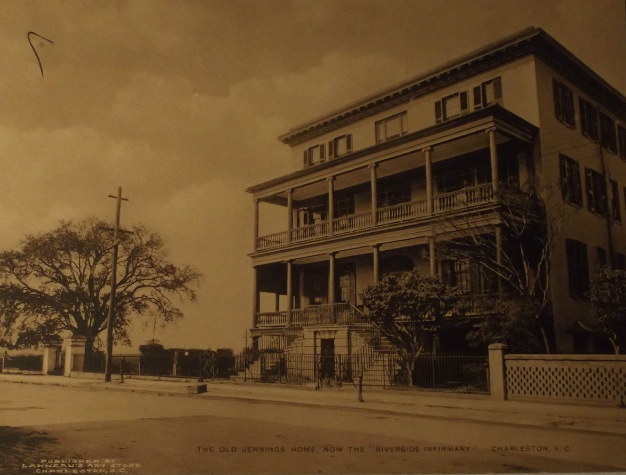
The Jonathan Lucas House in a Charleston postcard, about 1910

The Jonathan Lucas House is a historic house in Charleston, South Carolina.

Jonathan Lucas, Jr., the builder of the house, was born in England and developed milling machines for rice, which led to a boom in rice planting in South Carolina.

In 1893, the home began operating as medical facility called Riverside Infirmary, part of Memorial Hospital. It was also, for time, referred to as the Old Jennings House.

The National Historic Landmark house Hopsewee on the Santee River was also owned by family members, being purchased by John Hume Lucas in 1844.
