= Clark Mills (sculptor) =

American sculptor (1815–1883)

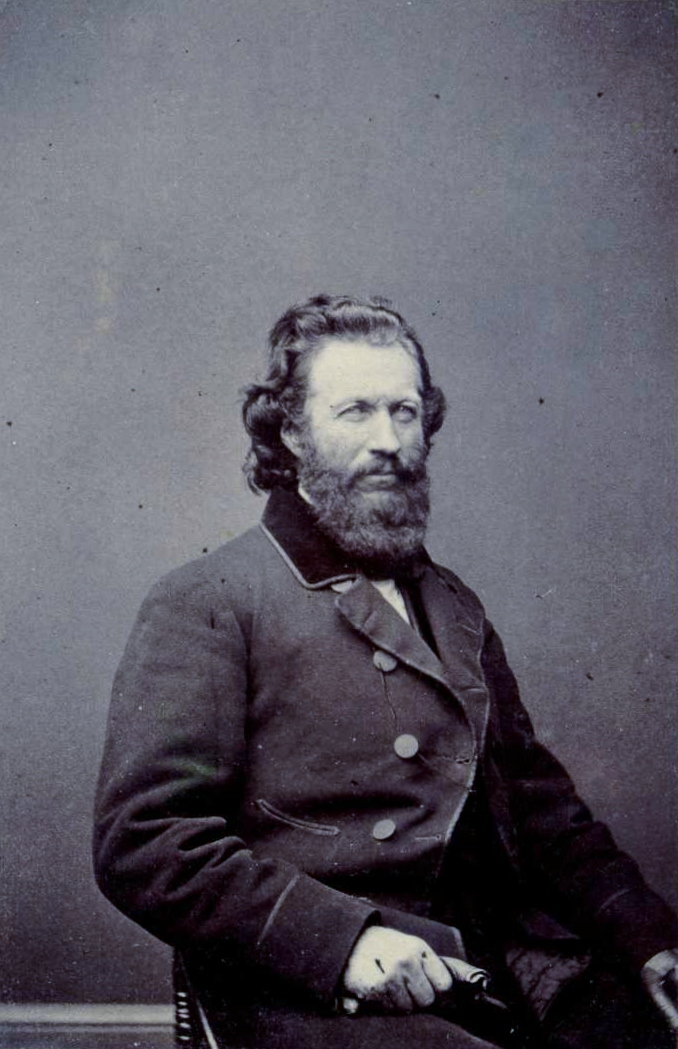
- Born: September 1, 1815
- Died: January 12, 1883 (aged 67)
- Education: self-taught
- Known for: Sculpture
- Notable work: Equestrian statue of Andrew Jackson (Washington, D.C.) (1853); Equestrian statue of George Washington (Washington Circle) (1860); Statue of Freedom (1863)

Clark Mills (September 1, 1815 – January 12, 1883) was an American sculptor, best known for four versions of an equestrian statue of Andrew Jackson, located in Washington, D.C., with replicas in Nashville, Tennessee, Jacksonville, Florida, and New Orleans, Louisiana.

== Early years ==
Mills was born on September 1, 1815, near Syracuse, in Onondaga County, New York. When his father died, he was sent to his uncle's but found that he was too harsh so he ran away. He had very little formal education. Before he turned 22, he had worked as a "teamster, lumberjack, farmhand, carpenter, and millwright." When he was quite young Mills was apprenticed to a millwright in New York. When he was twenty years old, in 1835, he overwintered in New Orleans. In 1837, he moved to Charleston, South Carolina, where he began to work as an ornamental plasterer. In the 1840s, he developed a faster, easier method of making plaster life-masks, which he then used to make portrait busts. E. Wayne Craven, author of the 1968 book Sculpture in America, wrote that "What he learned he acquired from the life-mask itself, and this established his style as one strongly dependent upon naturalism."

His first stone carving was an 1845 bust of John C. Calhoun, who in 1845, was Charleston's "most distinguished citizen". The bust is in the Charleston's City Hall Museum; a bronze version was formerly in the Corcoran Gallery of Art in Washington, D.C.

== Clark Mills studio and foundries ==
Clark Mills had a number of studios and foundries. From 1837 to 1848, Mills had his first studio on Broad Street, Charleston, South Carolina, which was assigned the National Historic Landmark designation on December 21, 1965, by the Office of Archeology and Historic Preservation (OAHP).

In 1849, in order to produce the Jackson equestrian statue, Mills built a temporary furnace and studio on the Ellipse at 15th and Pennsylvania Avenue, near LaFayette Square.There is a statue of General Sherman there currently, south of the Treasury Building. His equestrian statue of George Washington was also cast at this site.

Mills purchased a parcel on the border of Maryland and the District of Columbia where is constructed his mansion and a large octagon-shaped studio and foundry on Bladensburg Road. It was at the Bladensburg foundry that the 1863 bronze Statue of Freedom was cast.

== Major works ==
=== Equestrian statue of Andrew Jackson ===
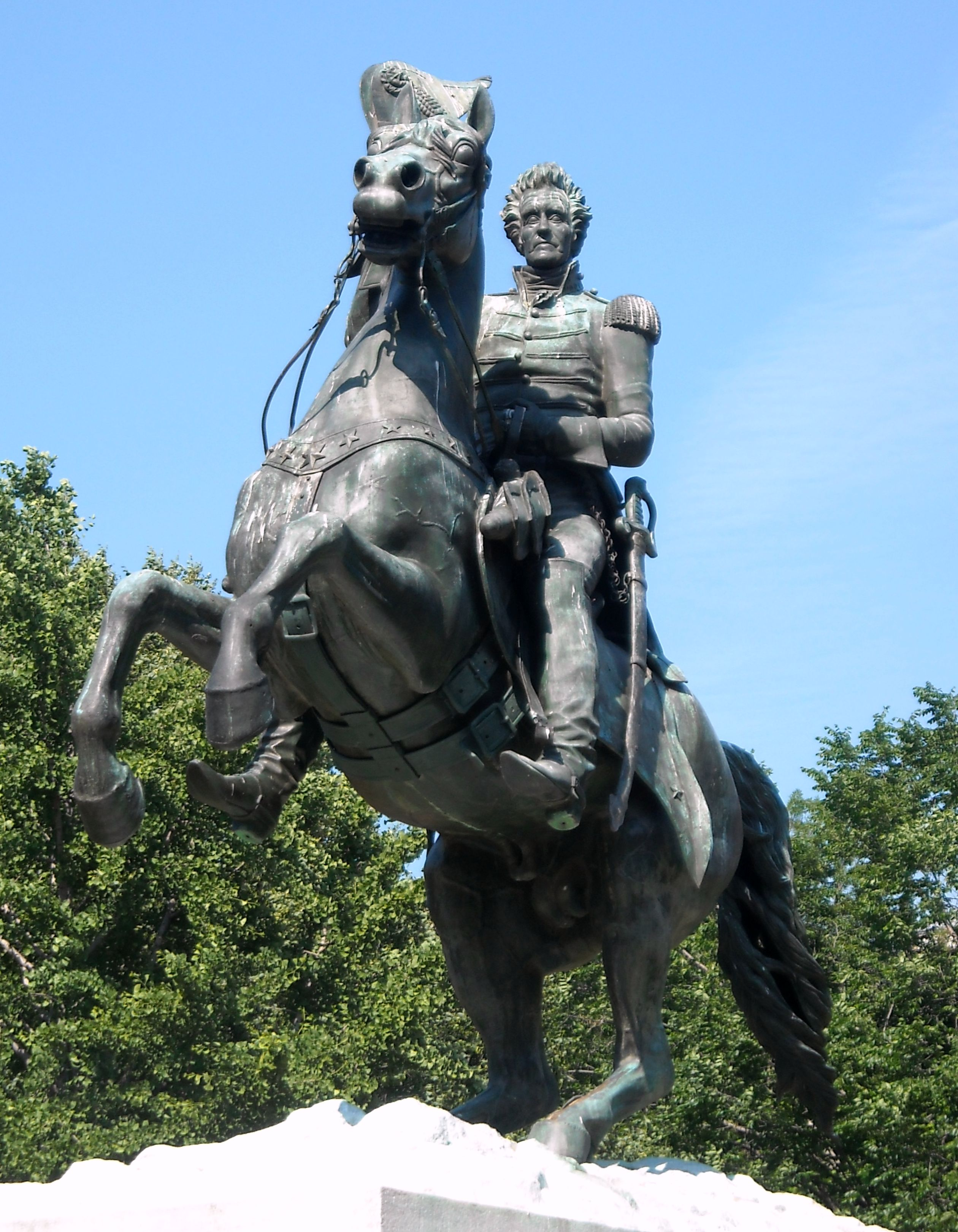
Equestrian statue Andrew Jackson, Lafayette Square, Washington, D.C.

Mills' most well-known sculpture is the equestrian statue of Andrew Jackson, located in President's Park, also known as Lafayette Square, which is situated on the north portico side of the White House.

Mills presented a submission to a competition for the contract to produce the statue. Mills' sculpture depicted Major Jackson on a rearing horse, raising his hat to the troops he was reviewing at the Battle of New Orleans on January 8, 1815.

He won the competition to create the statue in 1848 and moved from Charleston to Washington, bringing with him the enslaved master craftsman, Philip Reid (c. 1820 – February 6, 1892), whom he had purchased in 1842. Along with other workers, Mills had eleven slaves working for him. Reid and the other enslaved workers were freed with the passage of the April 16, 1862 District of Columbia Compensated Emancipation Act which freed thousands of slaves in that District.

James M. Goode, (1939-2019), Washington, D. C. historian, who published numerous books relating to Washington, D.C., history, provided details behind the creation of the statue. Goode described how Mills used his own horse, Olympus as a model for the horse Jackson was riding at the Battle of New Orleans—Duke. According to Goode, Mills taught Olympus to "rear up on its hind legs during the modeling process." Goode added that the public were "entranced" with Mill's statue in Washington. As a result, Mills cast three copies—that are now in "New Orleans (dedicated in 1856), Nashville (dedicated in 1880) and Jacksonville, Florida (dedicated 1987). Goode wrote that the statue was noteworthy as it was the first bronze statue cast in America and the "first equestrian statue in the world to be balanced on the horse's hind legs."

Goode also described the difficult casting process. Mills produced six castings of the statue of Andrew Jackson until the final one was completed, with ten pieces, six for Jackson and four for the horse. In his casting, he was assisted by Reid. The casting was completed 1852.

Mills unveiled the 15 ton bronze statue of Andrew Jackson on January 8, 1853, the 38th anniversary of the Battle of New Orleans and according to one account by a reporter for the Washington Union, twenty thousand people attended in and around the park. President Franklin Pierce was in attendance and Senator Stephen A. Douglas delivered the keynote address.

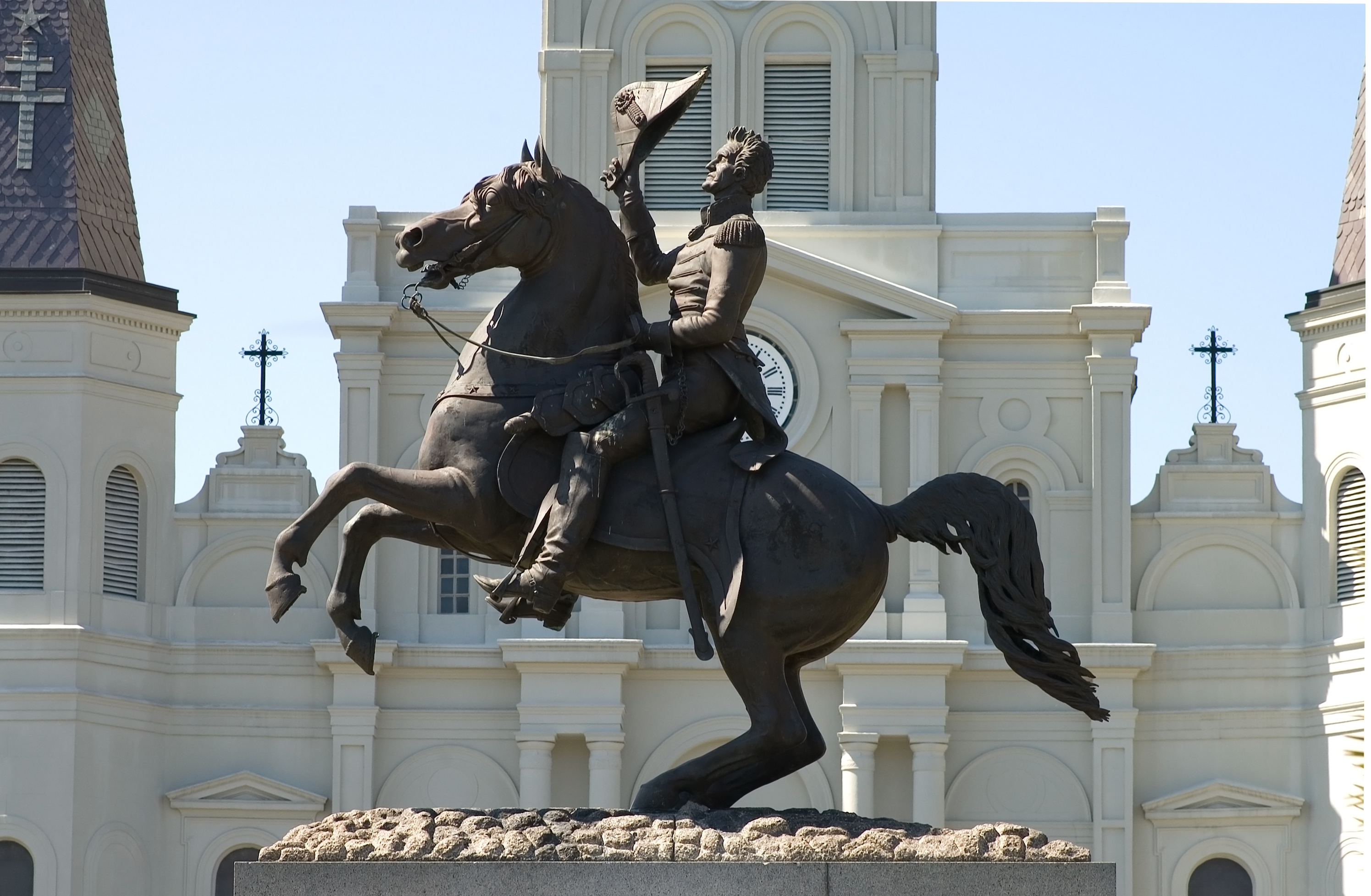
Jackson Square, New Orleans

Mills made castings of the statue that are now in New Orleans, Jacksonville, Florida, and Nashville, Tennessee.

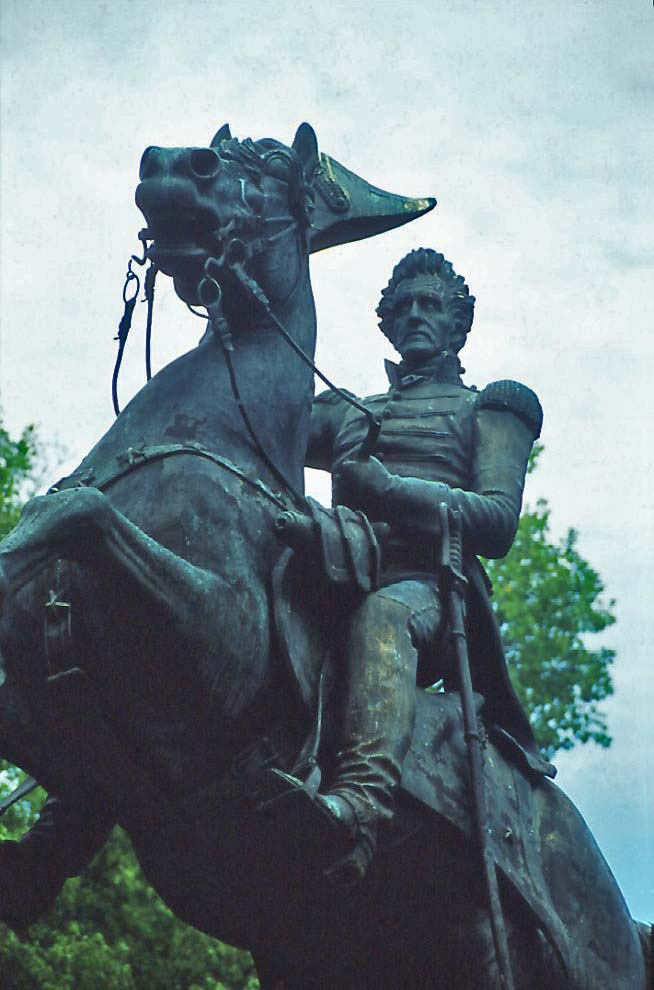
Nashville, Tennessee

=== Equestrian statue of George Washington (Washington Circle) (1860) ===
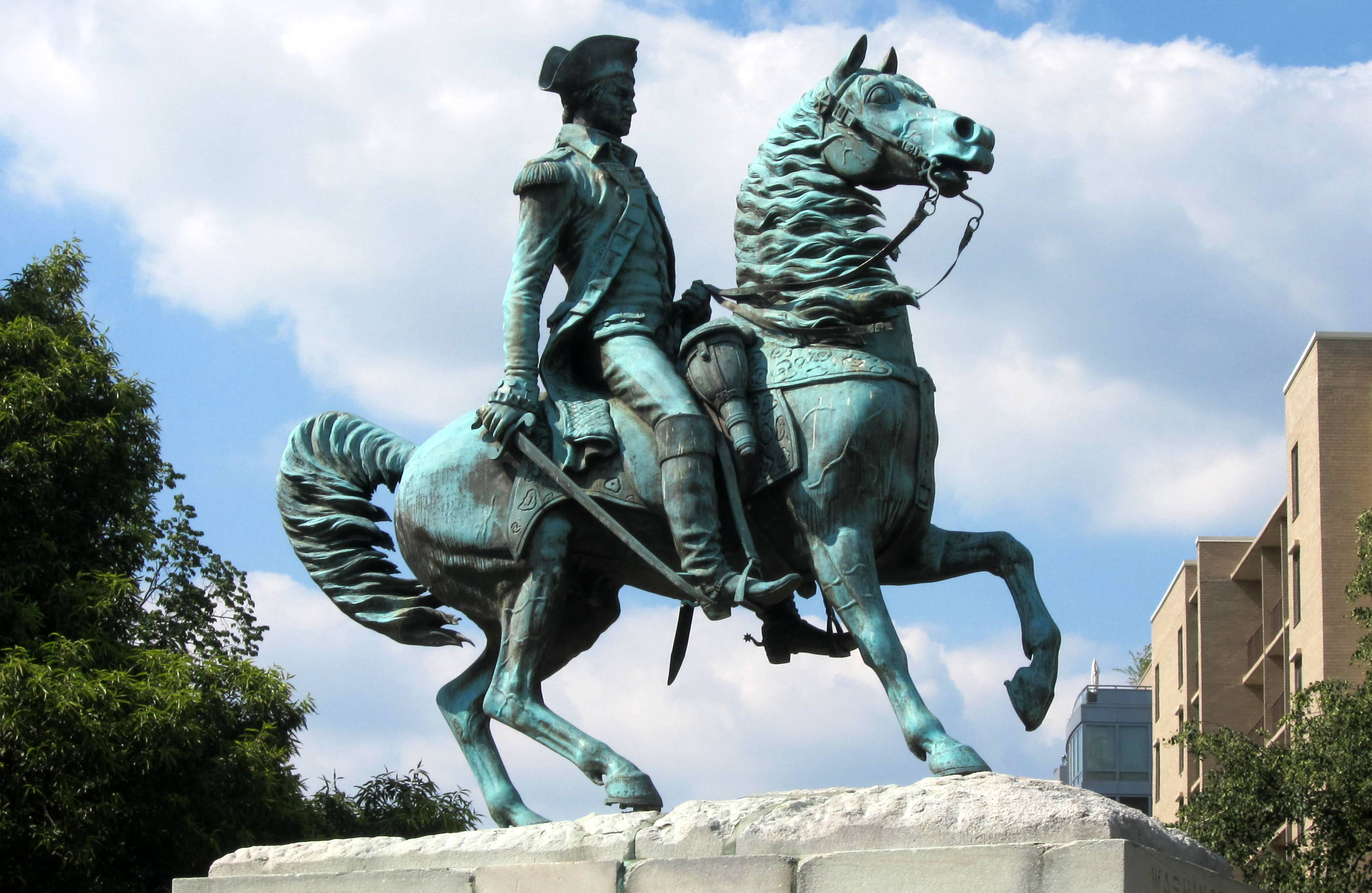
George Washington (statue) in Washington Circle

Mills also captured a tense and crucial moment in the American Revolutionary War with the creation of an equestrian statue of Lt. Gen. George Washington in 1860. Congress commissioned this work in 1853 because of the tremendous popularity of Mills' equestrian statue of Andrew Jackson. The elaborate high pedestal that Mills originally designed, with three tiers of sculptured relief panels and smaller equestrian statues of Washington's generals, were never executed because of a lack of adequate funds.

=== Statue of Freedom (1863) ===
Beginning in 1860, the Statue of Freedom, which was designed by Thomas Crawford and sits atop the United States Capitol, was cast in five main sections by Mills with the assistance of Philip Reid. The casting was undertaken at Mills' foundry on his estate on the border of Maryland and D.C.

=== Abraham Lincoln (1865) ===
Life mask of Abraham Lincoln, made in 1865

In 1865 Mills made a life-cast of Abraham Lincoln's head. It is generally felt to be inferior in technical quality to the 1860 cast made by Leonard Volk, but has the advantage of showing Lincoln's entire skull, not just the face as does Volk's.

=== Other works ===
Mills made 124 portrait busts. The Smithsonian has catalogued a series of life masks of native Americans, Mills made from 1875 to 1880. Mills made sixty-four native Americans from various tribes who had been imprisoned in Fort Marion, St. Augustine, Florida from 1875 onward in the aftermath of what was then-called the "American Indian Wars" in the west. The collection was held in the name of Richard Henry Pratt, a Civil War veteran, who supervised the prisoners at that time. Mills also made life masks of forty-seven boys and girls at Hampton Roads, Hampton Normal and Educational Institute in Virginia in March 1879.

== Reviews of Mill's work ==
In his biography of Mills, historian James Dillon, which was largely based on Wayne Craven's 1968 Sculpture in America, Dillon cited Craven, "In truth, Mills was a greater engineer than he was a sculptor. He deserves a special place.....for several reasons, but none of them is based primarily on aesthetic grounds or on the value of any piece or work of art....As an engineer and technician he was unsurpassed in his time in the casting of bronze; and special consideration should be given to his equestrian monument to Jackson and the brilliant solution he devised...." Dillon described Mills as a "pioneer in the working of the metal".

== Personal life ==
Mills was married and had three sons. His second wife and stepdaughter cared for him in his old age.

In 1846, Mills purchased a large tract of land from G. M. Calvert, that was partially in the Maryland and partially in District of Columbia, which included Meadow Bank Spa Spring. The parcel included a natural springs, locally known as Upper Hickey, which had a flow abundant enough for the operation of the foundry Mills planned to construct. This is where he built his large Bladensburg Road octagon-shaped foundry.

When Mills moved to Washington from Charleston, South Carolina in 1848, he brought his slaves with him. By 1862, he had eleven slaves working for him—Lettie, Tilly, Tow, Ellick, Jackson, George, Emily, and Levi Howard, Rachel Thomas, Auw Rofs and Philip Reid. They were freed under the 1862 District of Columbia Compensated Emancipation Act, which entitled Mills to $5,200 in compensation.

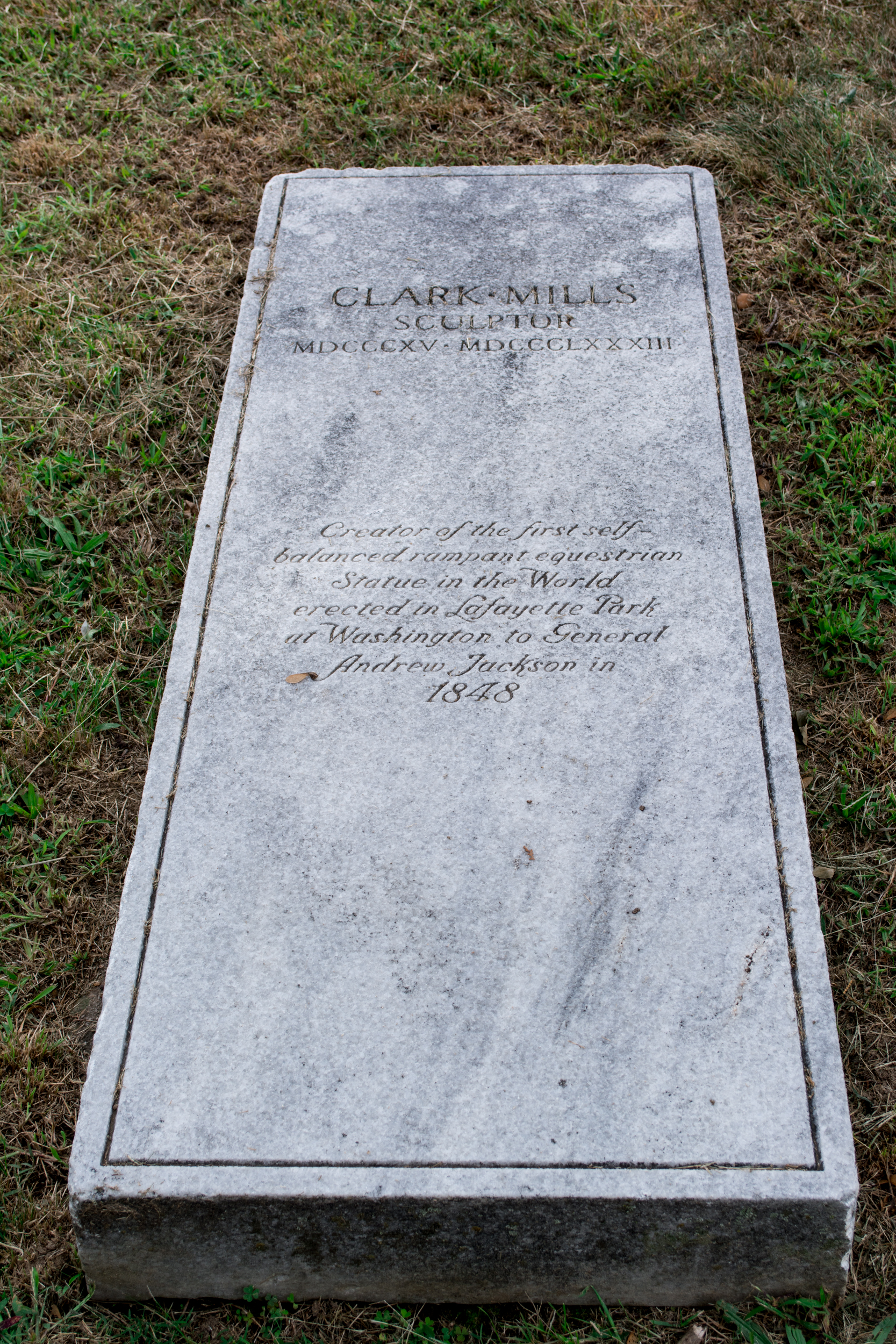
Glenwood Cemetery, Washington, D.C.

Mills was 72 years old when he died on January 12, 1883. He was interred at Glenwood Cemetery in Washington, D.C.

The three sons challenged the will which gave almost all the estate to Mills' second wife and stepdaughter. In 1884, Mills' estate was auctioned off in a public sale, and subdivided, largely because of the "acrimonious dispute" between his sons and his stepdaughter and second wife. The brass foundry remained operational until 1903, long after Mill's death.

== Honors ==
In World War II, the United States Liberty ship SS Clark Mills was named in his honor.

== Sources ==
- Meacham, Jon. American Lion: Andrew Jackson in the White House. 2008.
- Colbert, Charles (March 1988). "Clark Mills and the Phrenologist". The Art Bulletin. 70 (1): 134–137. doi:10.1080/00043079.1988.10788550. JSTOR 3051158.
