= Presqui'ile =

Historic house in South Carolina, United States

- U.S. National Register of Historic Places
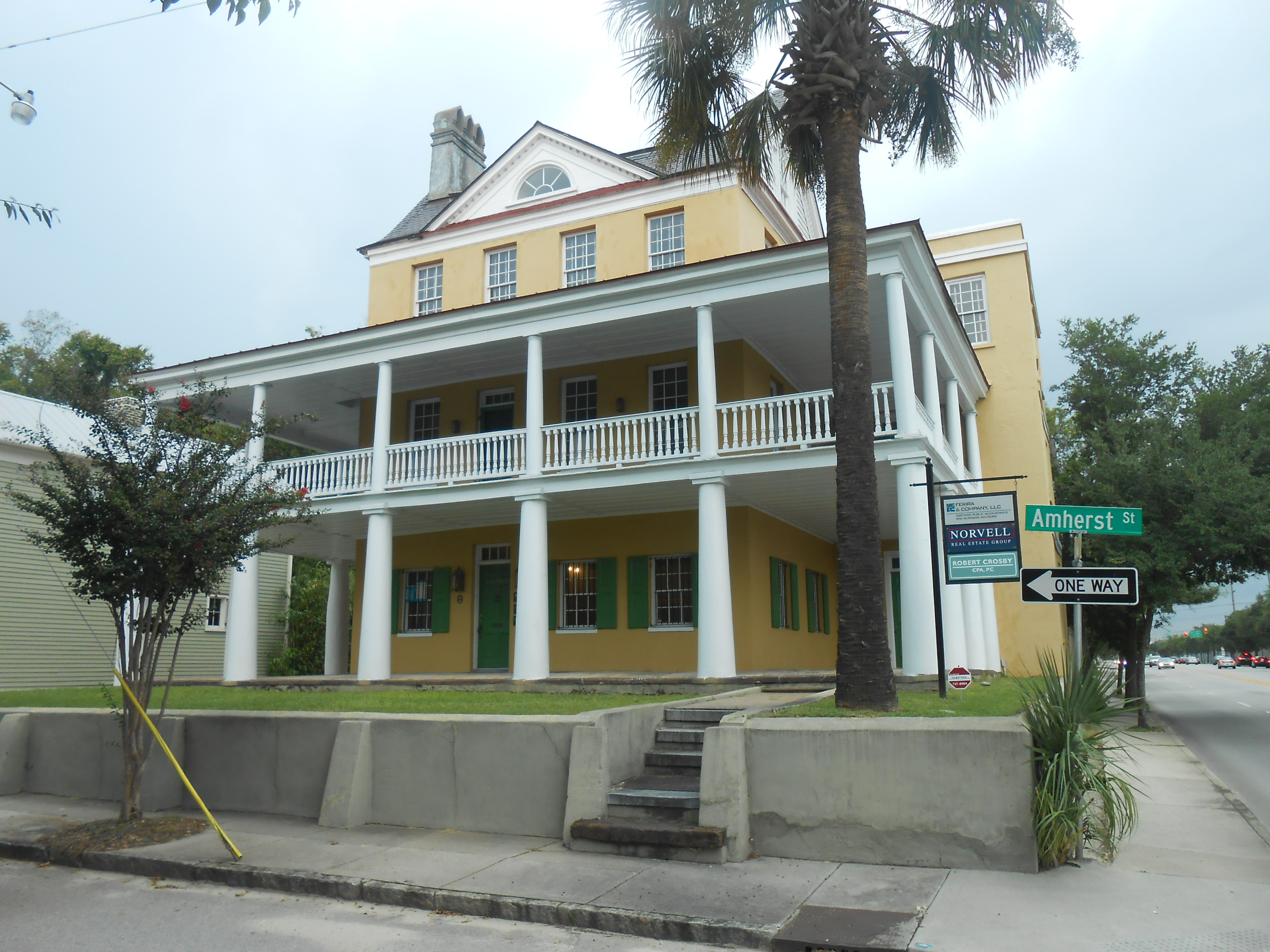

- Location within South Carolina Location within the United States
- Location: 2 Amherst St., Charleston, South Carolina
- Coordinates: 32°47′43.5″N 79°55′59.9″W
- Area: less than one acre
- Built: 1802
- Architectural style: Early Republic
- NRHP reference No.: 78002503
- Added to NRHP: December 8, 1978

Presqu'ile, or Presqui'ile, (pronounced Preesk-eel), the French term for "peninsula", was an appropriate name for the house built in Hampstead Village at 2 Amherst St., Charleston, South Carolina between 1802 and 1808 because, at the time, the house stood on a finger of high ground that projected into the marshes of the Cooper River. The builder, Jacob Belser, was a planter, attorney, and state senator (1812–15).

It has been speculated that the house was designed by Gabriel Manigault. The interior has fine Adamesque decorations of carved wood and a spiral staircase. Originally, there was a single room on the first and second floors and two on the third floor with the stairs set in a semicircular bay on the rear of the house. A square, three-story rear wing in the Greek Revival style was added by Henry Grimke, a planter who acquired the house in 1840.

Subsequent owners of the home have included Theodore S. Marion, Joshua T. Ward, Maj. Samuel Porcher (the likely builder of Numertia Plantation), Henry Grimke, Joseph Leary, C.F. Klenke, the Baptist Association, the Historic Charleston Foundation, Arthur Ravenel, Jr. & Co., Jean Ravenel, J. Randolph Pelzer, SPD Investments Company, LLC, Presqu’ile House, LLC, and Presqu’ile, LLC. The home is presently used as a law office by Clawson Fargnoli, LLC.

Presqu’ile received Carolopolis Awards in 1967 and 1978 from the Preservation Society of Charleston and was listed on the National Register of Historic Places in 1978. The house has been under an interior and exterior historic easement with the Historic Charleston Foundation since 1973.
