= Trenholm, Virginia =

Unincorporated community in Virginia, US

Coordinates: 37°35′42″N 78°03′43″W

Trenholm is an unincorporated community in Powhatan County, in the U.S. state of Virginia. This area includes historic Muddy Creek Baptist Church.
