= Trenholm (surname) =

Surname

Trenholm is an English surname of Norse origin. A variant of the surname is Trenholme. Trenholm is a habitational name from Trenholme in Whorlton, North Yorkshire in the North of England. It is derived from the Old Norse words "trani" meaning "crane", and "holmr", meaning "small island" or "water meadow".

== Notable people with the surname ==
- George Trenholm (1807–1876), South Carolina businessman, financier, politician, slaveowner and Confederate Secretary of the Treasury
- Will Trenholm, English rugby union player
- William L. Trenholm (1836–1901), Confederate Army veteran, United States Comptroller of the Currency (1886–1889), and president of the North American Trust Company (1898)
