= Battery LeRoy =

- U.S. National Register of Historic Places
- Location within South Carolina Location within the United States
- Location: Riverland Dr., James Island, Charleston, South Carolina
- Coordinates: 32°42′50″N 79°58′52″W
- Area: less than one acre
- Built: 1863
- MPS: Civil War Defenses of Charleston TR
- NRHP reference No.: 82004786
- Added to NRHP: August 11, 1982

Battery LeRoy is a historic artillery battery located at James Island, Charleston, South Carolina. It was built in 1863, and designed to protect lower James Island. At the end of the war this battery mounted four guns. The earthen redoubt measures approximately 340 feet on its right face, 140 feet on the center face and 160 feet on the left face. It has a 15-foot-high parapet wall and a slightly higher powder magazine.

It was listed on the National Register of Historic Places in 1982.
