= Josiah Smith Tennent House =

Historic house in Charleston, South Carolina, US

- U.S. National Register of Historic Places
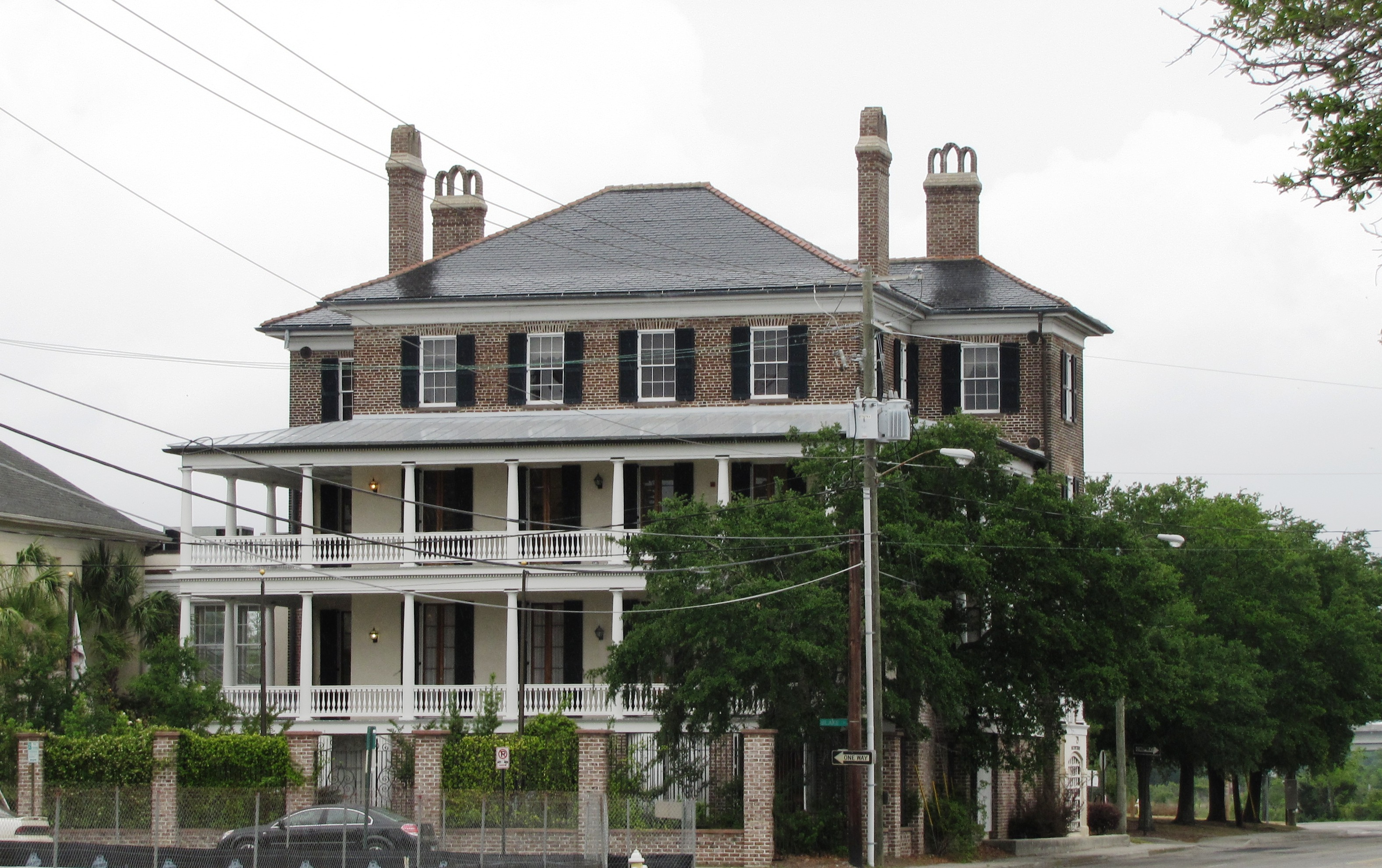
- Josiah Smith Tennent House

- Location within South Carolina Location within the United States
- Location: 729 East Bay St., Charleston, South Carolina
- Coordinates: 32°47′55″N 79°56′6″W
- Area: 0.25 acres (0.10 ha)
- Built: 1859
- Architectural style: Greek Revival
- NRHP reference No.: 79002377

The Josiah Smith Tennent House is an historic home in downtown Charleston, South Carolina. It was the last great antebellum mansion built in Charleston and is significant for historical and architectural reasons, given its location, past ownership by prominent Charleston families, as well as uses. It represents an historic, major phenomena of construction and has played an important part in the life of the community. Located at 729 East Bay Street on the corner of Blake Street, it is situated near the base of the Arthur Ravenel, Jr. Bridge and adjacent to the popular mixed-use Cigar Factory development. It stands out as a landmark against the skyline and a "gateway" to the City of Charleston.

The house was built by Josiah Smith and Mary Ramsay Tennent in 1859 and placed on the National Register of Historic Places in 1979. It was a large house of 10,000 square feet spread over four stories providing what was considered a comfortable, spacious living space for the time. However, despite its size, design, and careful craftsmanship, the house seemed to show a battening down before the storm.

During the Civil War, the house became a Confederate hospital called Soldiers' Relief Home and served as an asylum for displaced patients when the First North Carolina Hospital on Mary Street burned in 1864. It survived the 1886 earthquake but was severely damaged by multiple uses and years of virtual abandonment. It was restored in 2000 by a non-profit organization for use as a community center but was purchased by the City of Charleston in 2008 due to financial hardship.

The Josiah Smith Tennent House is now owned by local Charleston attorneys Todd Manley and Meredith Hastings Manley. Preservation-minded plans are underway for the mansion's conversion into an event venue with six on-site bedrooms, a ballroom, two bars, a small movie theater, a speakeasy bar / groom's area, a bridal area, a grand chef's kitchen and a separate catering kitchen, a 63-foot garden room with black and white European tile flooring, a commercial elevator, Philip Simmons gates and ironwork throughout the enclosed courtyard, and wide wrap-around piazzas overlooking the large courtyard and the harbor.
