= Battery Wilkes =

- U.S. National Register of Historic Places
- Location within South Carolina Location within the United States
- Location: St. Andrew's Parish, West Ashley, South Carolina
- Coordinates: 32°47′38″N 80°3′56″W
- Area: 1 acre (0.40 ha)
- Built: 1862
- MPS: Civil War Defenses of Charleston TR
- NRHP reference No.: 82001516
- Added to NRHP: October 21, 1982

Battery Wilkes is a historic artillery battery located at West Ashley, Charleston, South Carolina. It was built in 1862, as a part of the western exterior defense line. It is a small earthen redoubt has a 10-foot-high parapet wall and a 15-foot-high powder magazine.

It was listed on the National Register of Historic Places in 1982.
