= William Robb House =

Historic house in South Carolina, United States

- U.S. National Register of Historic Places
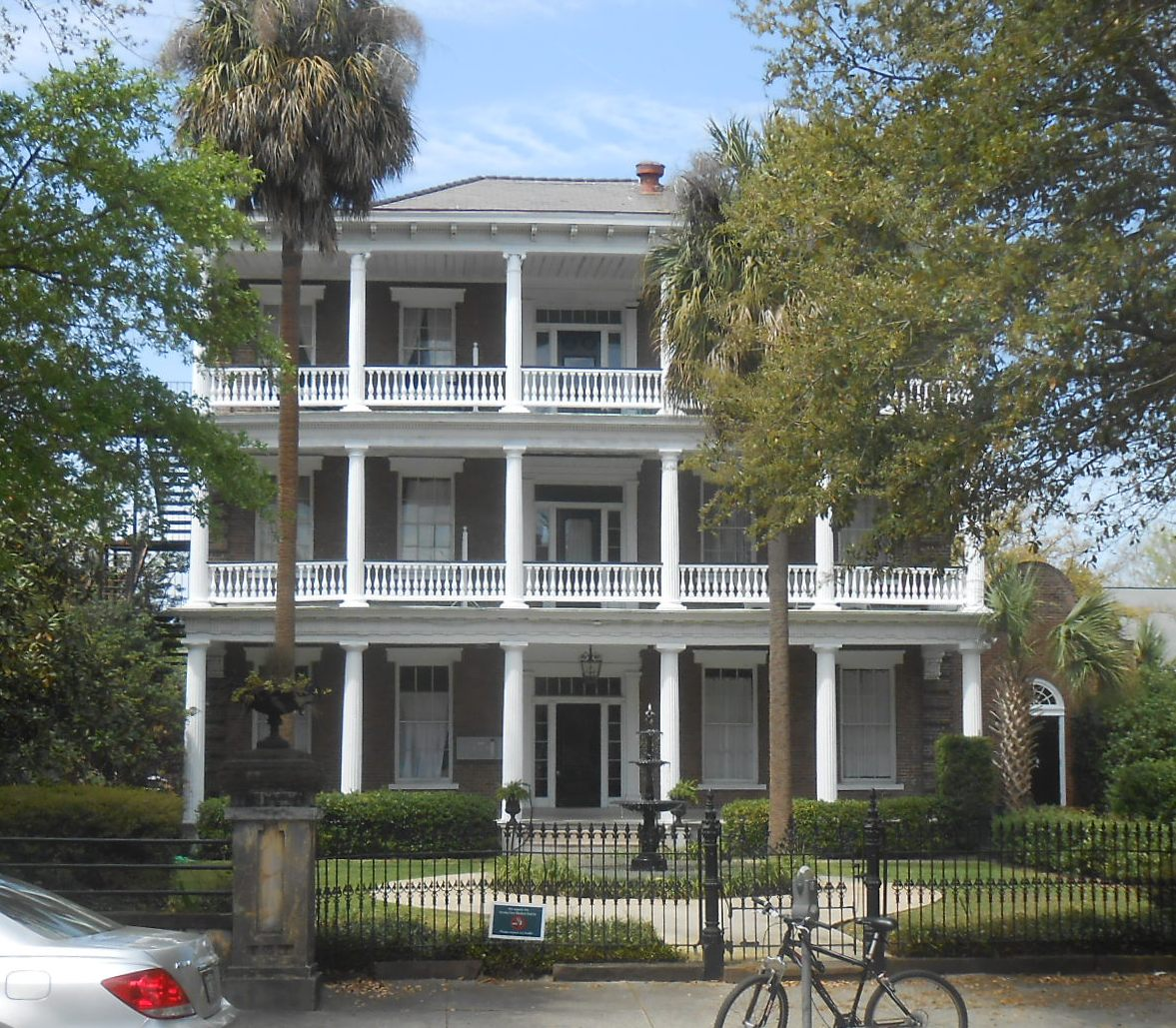
- William Robb House

- Location within South Carolina Location within the United States
- Location: 12 Bee St., Charleston, South Carolina
- Coordinates: 32°47′15″N 79°56′50″W
- Built: 1858
- Architectural style: Classical Revival
- NRHP reference No.: 83002186

The William Robb House is a mid 19th-century house in Charleston, South Carolina situated at No.12 (formerly No.4) Bee Street.

It was built in 1858 by William Robb (1824-85) the son of James Robb (1790-1859), a Grocer and Rice Mill owner born in Logie parish by Stirling, Scotland and his Scots-born wife Jane Smith from Kilmarnock.
