= Battery Tynes =

- U.S. National Register of Historic Places
- Location within South Carolina Location within the United States
- Location: Stono River, James Island, Charleston, South Carolina
- Coordinates: 32°43′28″N 79°59′23″W
- Area: 2 acres (0.81 ha)
- Built: 1863
- MPS: Civil War Defenses of Charleston TR
- NRHP reference No.: 82004789
- Added to NRHP: August 11, 1982

Battery Tynes is a historic artillery battery located at James Island, Charleston, South Carolina. It was built in 1863, and designed to protect the upper Stono River and the bridge from James Island to Johns Island, South Carolina. The earthen redoubt measures approximately 320 feet long and 180 feet deep. It has a 10–20 foot high parapet wall and a 15 feet high powder magazine.

It was listed on the National Register of Historic Places in 1982.
