= Battery No. 5 =

- Battery No. 5.jpg
- U.S. National Register of Historic Places
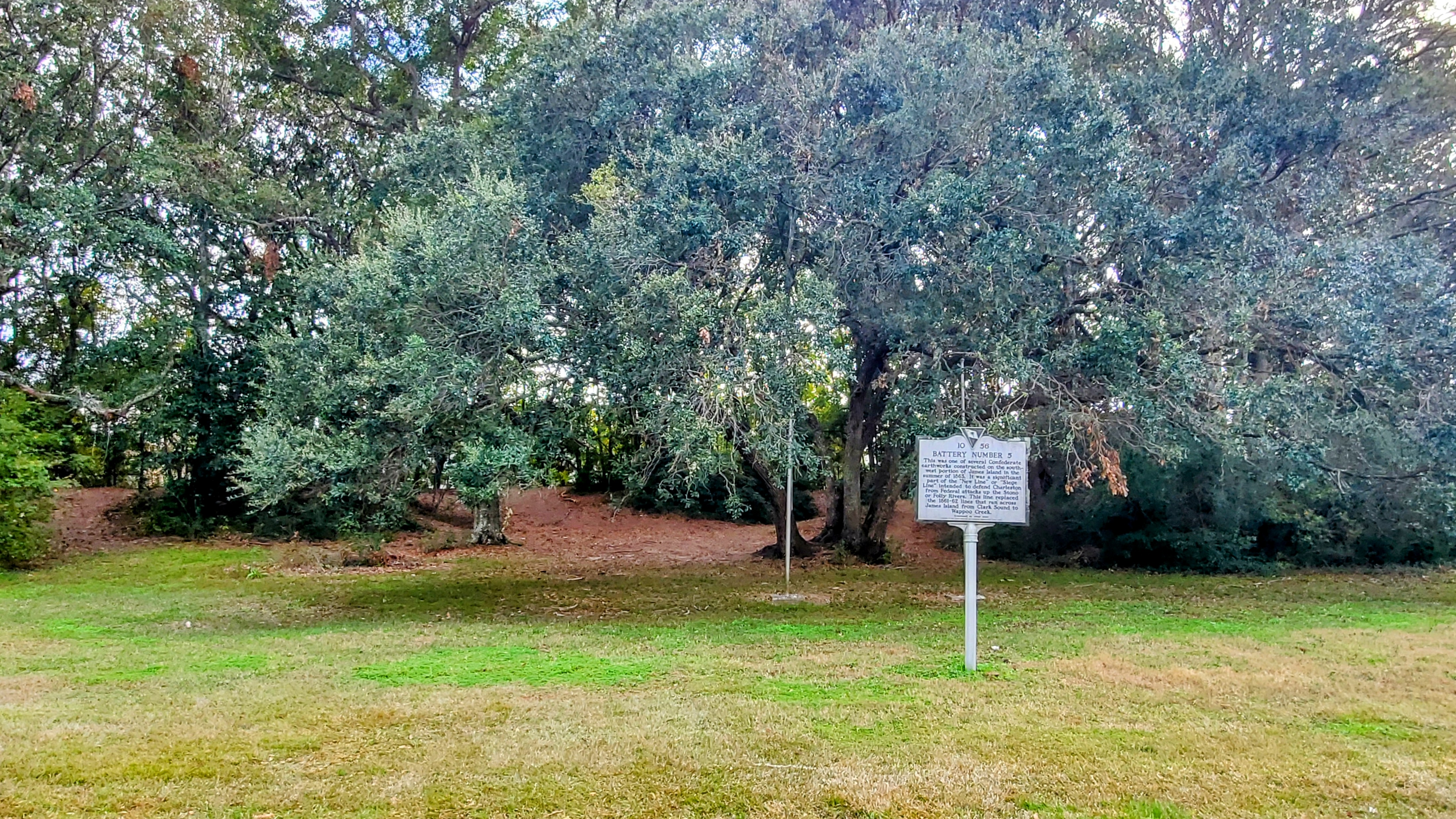

- Location within South Carolina Location within the United States
- Location: Stonefield Subdivision, James Island, Charleston, South Carolina
- Coordinates: 32°42′30″N 79°57′18″W
- Area: 2 acres (0.81 ha)
- Built: 1863
- MPS: Civil War Defenses of Charleston TR
- NRHP reference No.: 82004788
- Added to NRHP: August 11, 1982

Battery No. 5 is a historic artillery battery located at James Island, Charleston, South Carolina. It was built in 1863, as part of the James Island Siege Line. At the close of the war it was armed with four guns. The earthen redoubt's left faces measuring about 200 feet and the center face about 100 feet. It has a 10 foot high parapet wall.

It was listed on the National Register of Historic Places in 1982.
