= Fort Trenholm =

- U.S. National Register of Historic Places
- Location within South Carolina Location within the United States
- Location: John's Island Airport, Johns Island, Charleston, South Carolina
- Coordinates: 32°42′29″N 79°59′49″W
- Area: 3 acres (1.2 ha)
- Built: 1864
- MPS: Civil War Defenses of Charleston TR
- NRHP reference No.: 82004791
- Added to NRHP: August 11, 1982

Fort Trenholm, also known as Battery Trenholm, is a historic artillery battery located at Johns Island, Charleston, South Carolina. It was built in 1864, to reinforce Fort Pringle and protect the Stono River and Johns Island. It has emplacements for 17 guns. The three-sided earthen redoubt measures approximately 870 feet on its eastern face, 780 feet long on its southern face, and 885 feet long on its western face. It has a 15-foot-high parapet wall.

It was listed on the National Register of Historic Places in 1982.
