= Sixth Naval District Training Aids Library =

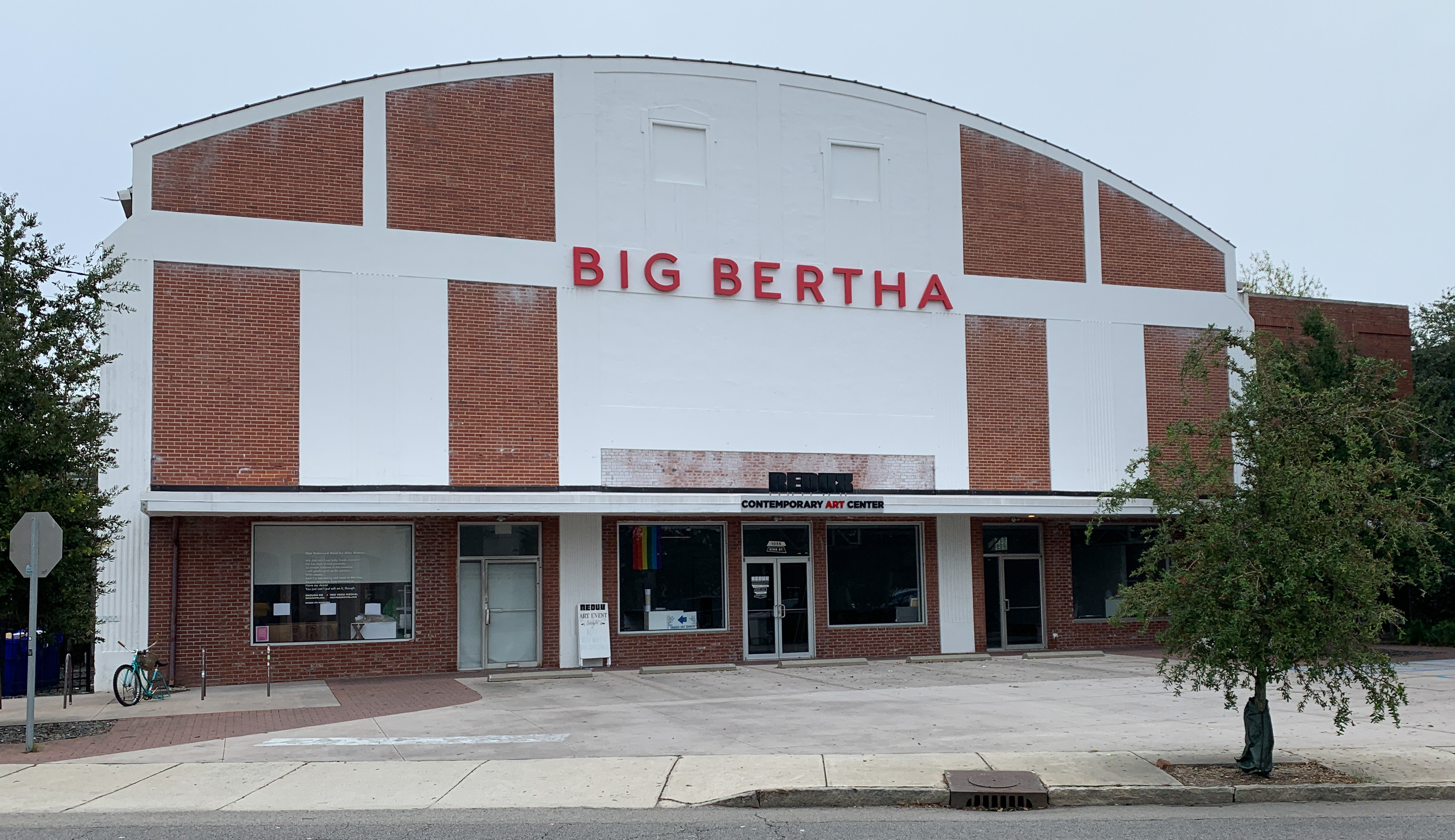
- The building in 2019
- Alternative names: The Hanger

General information
- Location: 1056 King St., Charleston, South Carolina
- Coordinates: 32.805187°N 79.950306°W
- Completed: 1942

Design and construction
- Architect(s): Augustus Constantine

Sixth Naval District Training Aids Library (also known as The Hanger) is located at 1056 King Street, Charleston, South Carolina. The building was listed on the National Register of Historic Places in 2017 due to its symbolization of the rapid development of the Navy in Charleston from 1943 to 1946. It is the current location for the Redux Contemporary Art Center.

== Construction and use ==
Construction on the building began in 1942. The building was initially supposed to be a warehouse but builders converted it into a theater during the $15,000 construction process. Before the theater began operation, the Navy commandeered the facility and used it as a training center for the Sixth Naval District. The facility also served as a hub for distributing training films to other facilities throughout the district. Following the end of World War II and the Navy's demobilization, the building was vacated. It was then converted to an Edens' grocery store which operated from March 30, 1949 to 1955. From 1955 to 1958, Skipper's Skateland leased the top floor of the building. The skate rink claimed to be the largest in the state.

When Redux Contemporary Art Center chose the building as its new location in 2017, the property had been vacant for sixteen years. At its new location, Redux has over 35 studios in the building, print and photo studios, as well as office space.
