= Secessionville Historic District =

Historic district in South Carolina, United States

- U.S. National Register of Historic Places
- U.S. Historic district
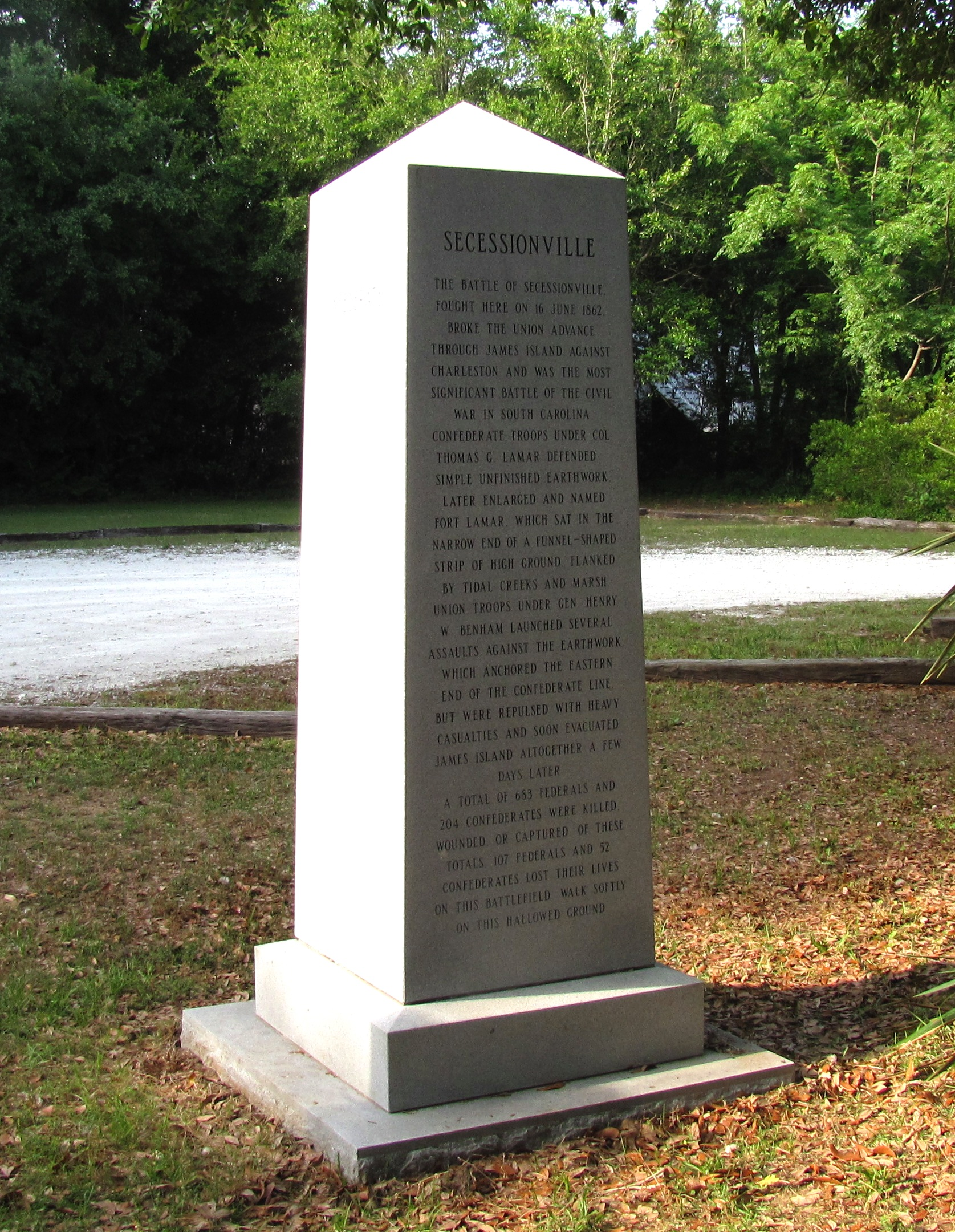
- Obelisk at the Fort Lamar site, Secessionville Historic District, May 2010

- Location within South Carolina Location within the United States
- Location: North of Folly Beach, near Folly Beach, South Carolina
- Coordinates: 32°42′18″N 79°56′35″W
- Area: 41 acres (17 ha)
- Built: 1862
- Architectural style: Late Victorian, Greek Revival
- NRHP reference No.: 79002378
- Added to NRHP: October 1, 1979

Secessionville Historic District is a national historic district located near Folly Beach, Charleston County, South Carolina. It extends into the city of Charleston, South Carolina. The district encompasses six contributing buildings, one contributing site, and one contributing site in Secessionville. The district includes the summer homes of several leading James Island planters, the site of the American Civil War Battle of Secessionville, the unmarked grave of over 300 Union soldiers, and the remains of Fort Lamar, constructed about 1862.

The houses include one Victorian and two antebellum Greek Revival residences.

It was listed on the National Register of Historic Places in 1979.
