= James Sparrow House =

Historic house in South Carolina, United States

- U.S. National Register of Historic Places
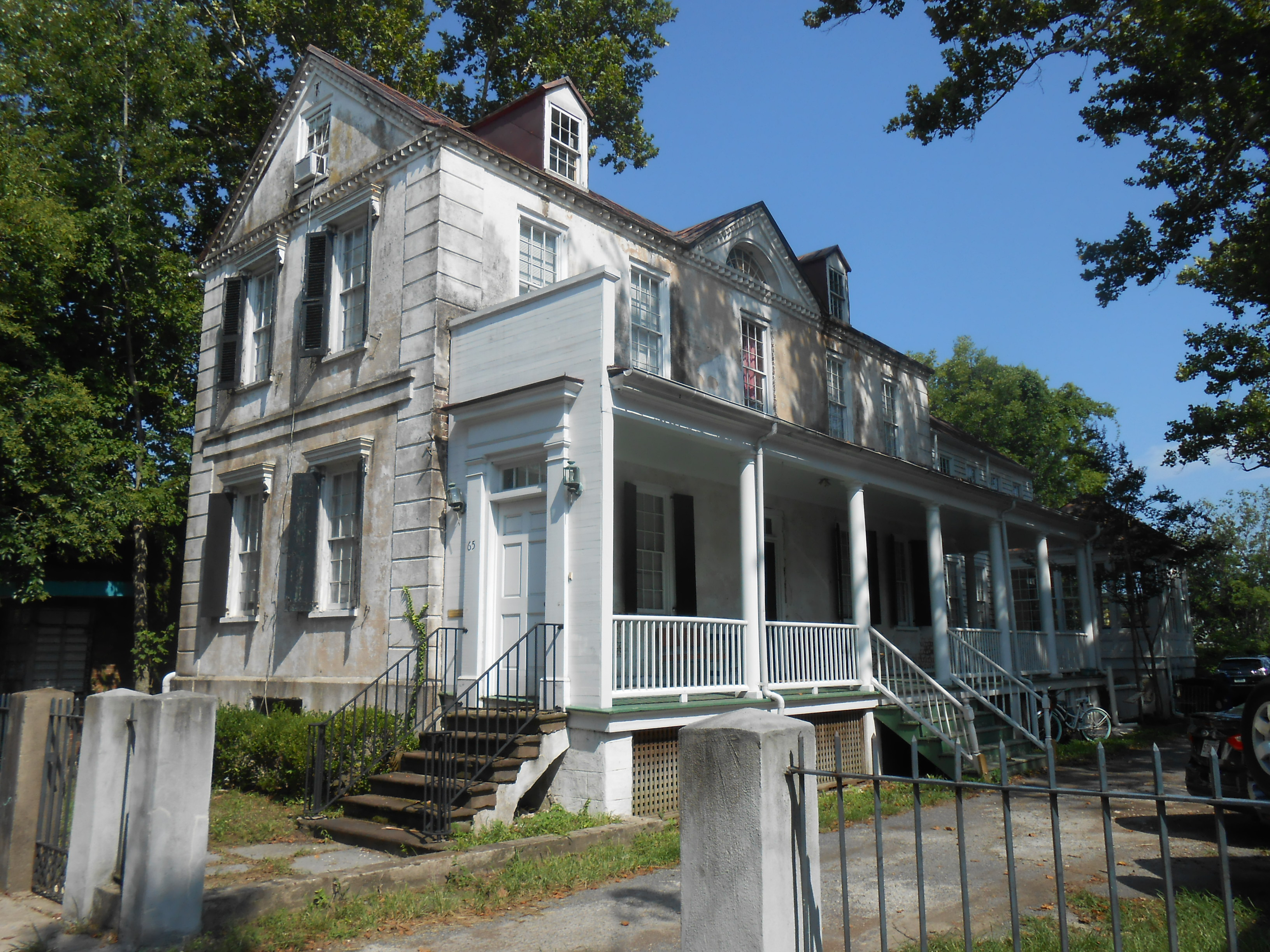
- James Sparrow House

- Location within South Carolina Location within the United States
- Location: 65 Cannon St., Charleston, South Carolina
- Coordinates: 32°47′24″N 79°56′41″W
- Built: 1818
- Architectural style: Late Federal
- NRHP reference No.: 98000045

The James Sparrow House is a Charleston single house in the late Federal style. It is named for a Charleston butcher who acquired the property at 65 Cannon St. in 1797. Several other butchers owned and lived in the house by 1825 when Christian David Happoldt bought the house. (Charleston County deed book O9, page 366) It remained in his family until 1907. (Charleston County deed book U24, page 538) It is a two and one-half story stuccoed brick house, raised on a basement of the same material. The masonry has an embellished by a dog-tooth cornice, with full return, repeated in the rake of the gable end. Quoins of stuccoed brick articulate the corners and a stringcourse of the same material delineates the floor levels. Two interior chimneys, with Gothic arched hoods, on the east side of the house were reconstructed after the earthquake of 1886. The house was listed in the National Register January 30, 1998.

By 1995, the house was in terrible condition. Many of its interior details had been lost, and the exterior had suffered the loss of its piazzas. Robert and Nancy Mikell purchased the house and undertook a restoration. An addition to the rear was designed by Charleston architect Randolph Martz.
