= Fort Pringle =

- U.S. National Register of Historic Places
- Location within South Carolina Location within the United States
- Location: Riverland Dr., James Island, Charleston, South Carolina
- Coordinates: 32°42′50″N 79°59′7″W
- Area: 4 acres (1.6 ha)
- Built: 1863
- MPS: Civil War Defenses of Charleston TR
- NRHP reference No.: 82004790
- Added to NRHP: August 11, 1982

Fort Pringle is a historic artillery battery located at James Island, Charleston, South Carolina. It was built in 1863, as part of the James Island Siege Line and protect the Stono River, Johns Island and lower James Island. At the close of the war it was armed with nine heavy cannons. The earthen redoubt's river face measures approximately 360 feet, the right or upstream face 160 feet, the left or downstream face 400 feet, and the rear face approximately 520 feet in length. It has a 7.5 to 12.5 foot high parapet wall and 12.5 feet tall powder magazine.

It was listed on the National Register of Historic Places in 1982.
