= Unitarian Church in Charleston =

Historic church in South Carolina, United States

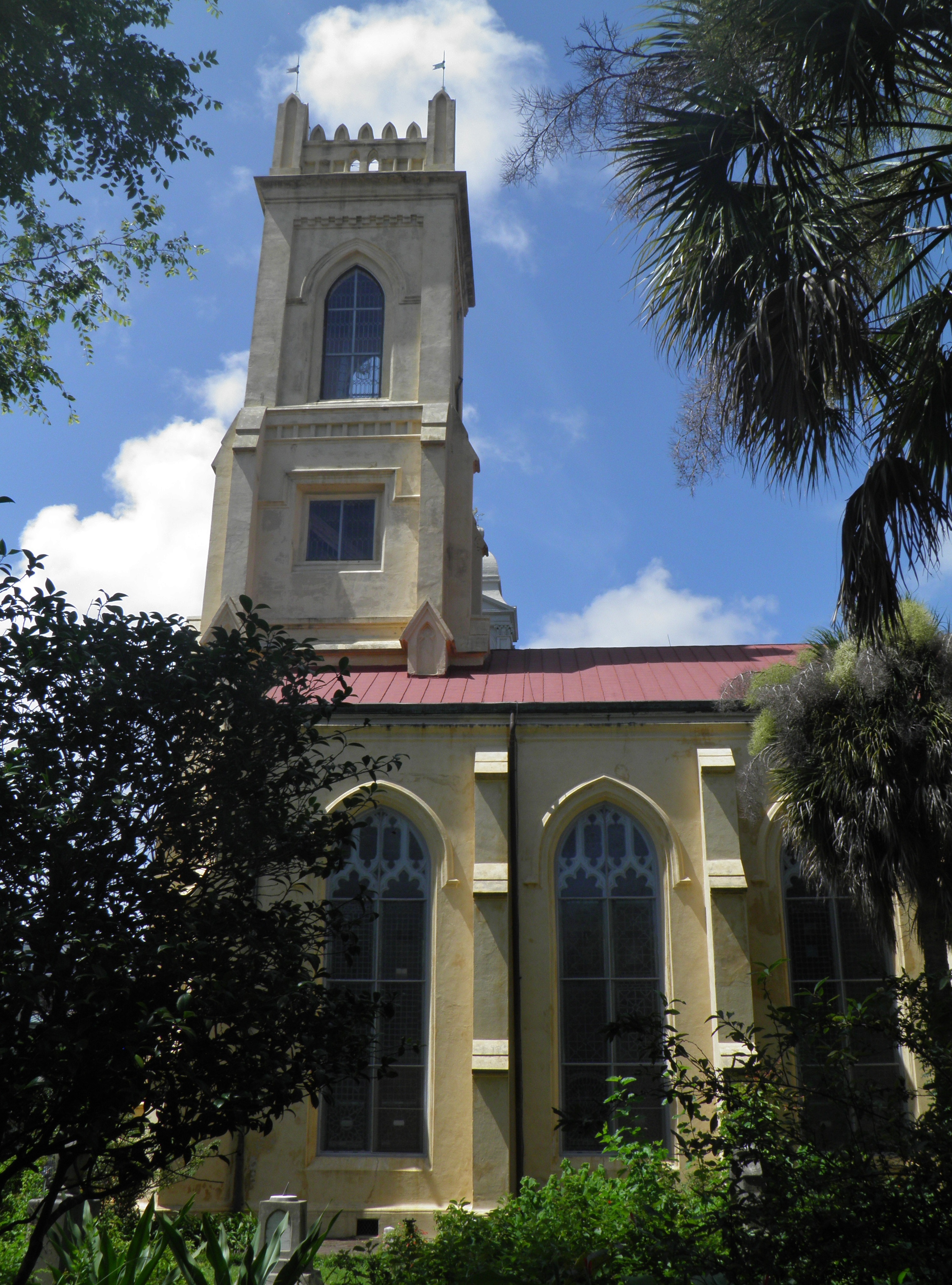
- The Unitarian Church in Charleston

Religion
- Affiliation: Unitarian Universalist Association
- Leadership: The Reverend Rebecca Hinds, Minister

Location
- Location: 4 Archdale Street, Charleston, South Carolina, U.S.A.
- Interactive map of Unitarian Church in Charleston
- Coordinates: 32.7785°N 79.9342°W]

Architecture
- Architect: Francis D. Lee
- Style: English Gothic architecture
- Completed: 1787

Website
- Unitarian Church in Charleston

The Unitarian Church in Charleston, home to a Unitarian Universalist congregation, is a historic church located at 4 Archdale Street in Charleston, South Carolina. It is the oldest Unitarian church in the South and the second oldest church building on the peninsula of Charleston.

The church has received Welcoming Congregation status from the Unitarian Universalist Association as well as Green Sanctuary certification. It is known in Charleston for its social justice activities.

The Unitarian Church in Charleston was declared a National Historic Landmark. in 1976. The church is open to the public for tours at designated times and hosts public concerts, lectures, and programs related to contemporary social and political issues. Visit the church’s website for details.

== Early history and conversion to Unitarianism ==
The Unitarian Church in Charleston was originally built as a second meeting house for the Independent Church in Charleston, also known as the Society of Dissenters, because the congregation needed more space than its Meeting Street location could provide. This second building was to be Georgian in style, plain brick with two doors and a tower in front. Construction began in 1772 and was nearly completed in 1776 when the Revolutionary War began. Because both Colonial and British forces quartered militia in the building, it needed considerable repair after the war. Unofficially named the Archdale Street Meeting House, it was finally dedicated in 1787.

For 30 years following the dedication, the Meeting Street and Archdale Street churches operated as a single entity. They shared not only the same two ministers, but the same sermon was delivered each Sunday. Drs. Hollinshead and Keith, co-pastors of the church for most of this period, each preached one sermon in both houses each Sunday, alternating morning and afternoon services. In 1815, one of the co-pastors was the Reverend Anthony Forster. Forster was married to Altona Gales, the daughter of Joseph Gales, a North Carolina printer and a close associate of Joseph Priestley. Gales and Priestley were friends in England, and both fled England to escape religious persecution in 1795-1796. Dr. Joseph Priestley was the eminent British Scientist who discovered oxygen and carbonated water. Priestley was also a Unitarian Minister, and a dissenter. When Anthony Forster converted from the trinitarian to unitarian theology in 1817, the congregation split, with 75 members out of 144 leaving the mother church to form an independent church based in the Archdale Meeting House. (The original Independent Church on Meeting Street is now the site of the Circular Congregational Church.) The new congregation was chartered as the Second Independent Church of Charleston in 1817.

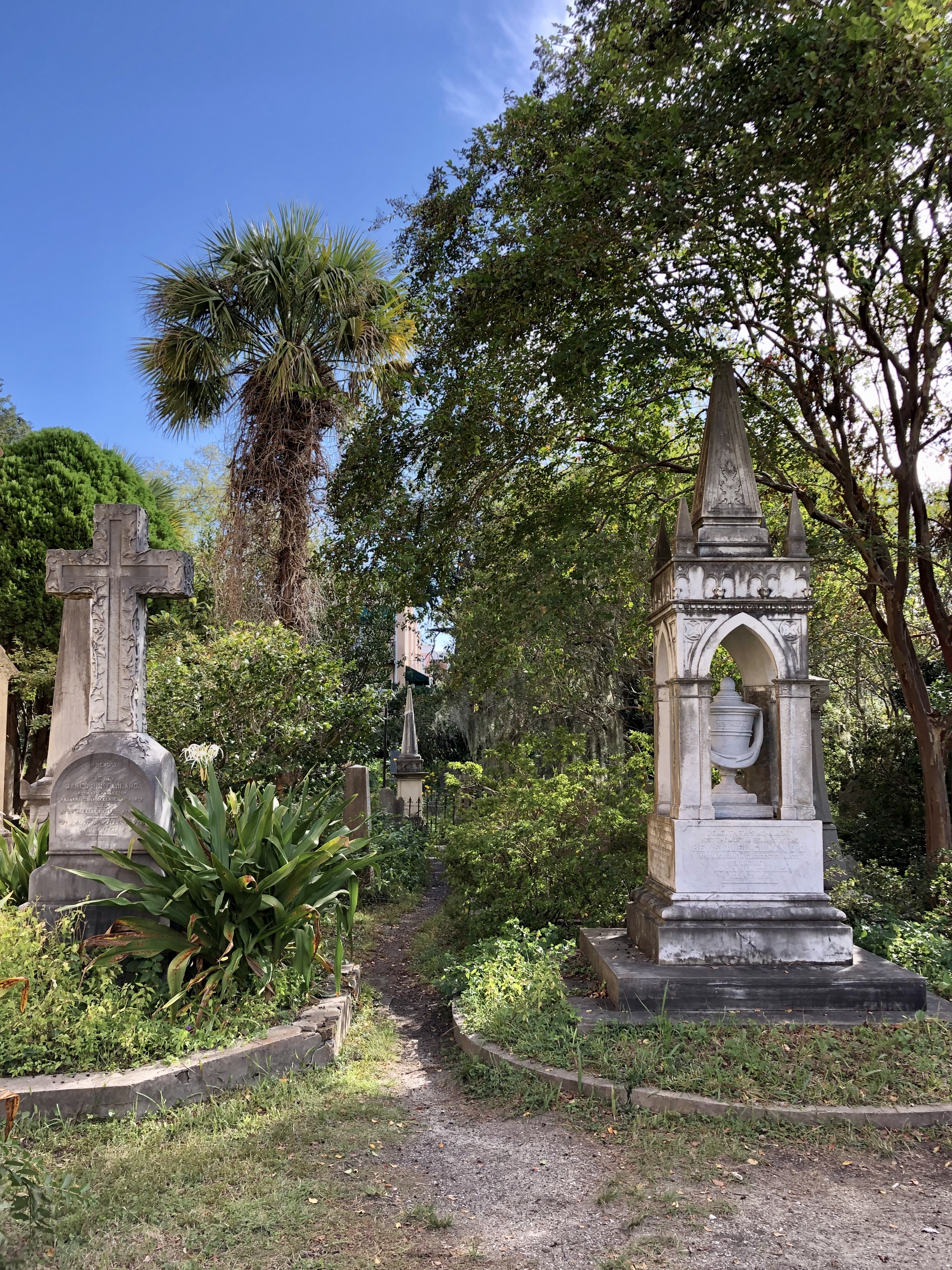
Garden churchyard extending from Archdale to King Street

As Forster succumbed to an old Army illness in 1819, Samuel Gilman, a graduate of Harvard College and an “avowed Unitarian”, was hired to complete the slow transition to Unitarianism. While at Harvard, Gilman wrote Harvard’s alma mater, Fair Harvard. Gilman’s wife, Caroline Howard Gilman, was a well-known author and poet. She was inspired by Mount Auburn Cemetery in Massachusetts, to create the churchyard next to the church in the 1830s with beautiful plants and objects; a place to be used by the living. Samuel Gillman remained the minister of the church until his death in 1858. During his tenure, he was known as a fine speaker and grew the congregation substantially. Ralph Waldo Emerson also spoke at the church on two different occasions in 1823. The church was chartered as the Unitarian Church in Charleston when it joined the American Unitarian Association in 1839.

== Renovation in the English Perpendicular Gothic Revival style ==
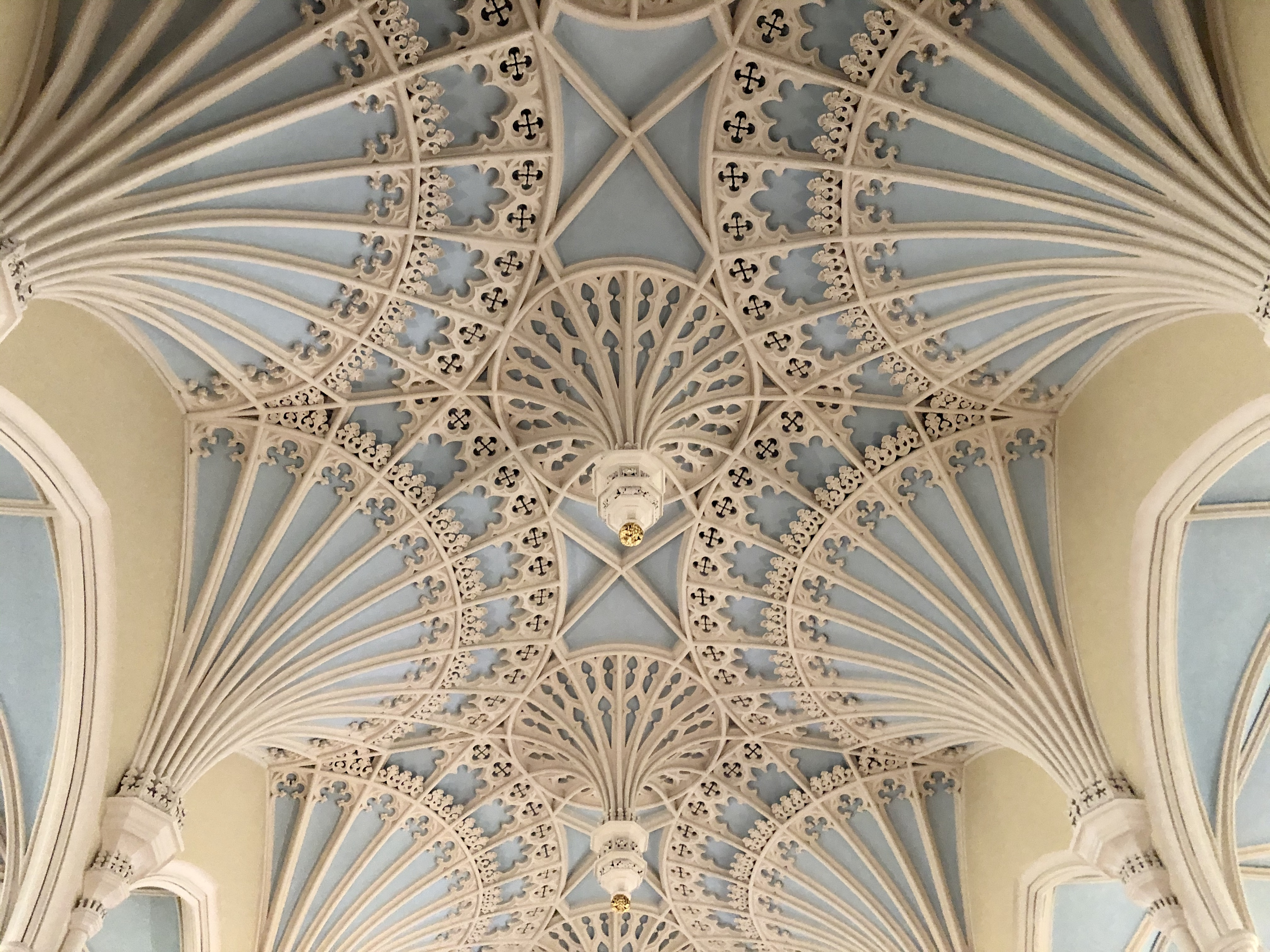
Fan tracery ceiling

Francis D. Lee, a Charleston architect and church member, was hired in 1852 to enlarge and remodel the building. Inspired by architecture such as is seen in the Chapel of Henry VII at Westminster Abbey and St George's Chapel at Windsor Castle, Lee completed the project two years later in partnership with Edward C. Jones, a local architect with more experience than Lee. Lee was only 26 years old at the time with only one statue on his resume, Jones was 28 years old but had been in construction since he was 15 years of age. The project involved raising the entire roof of the building four feet, adding a Chancel, and constructing false flying buttresses to provide the proportions and looks of a Gothic building. In addition, the tower was raised and was built to include an office for the minister. The fan-vaulted ceiling, nave, and chancel closely resembled their English prototypes; the stained glass windows were considered among the finest in the country. The church may have been the first building of Gothic architecture built in the United States. The style is referred to as English Perpendicular Gothic Revival.

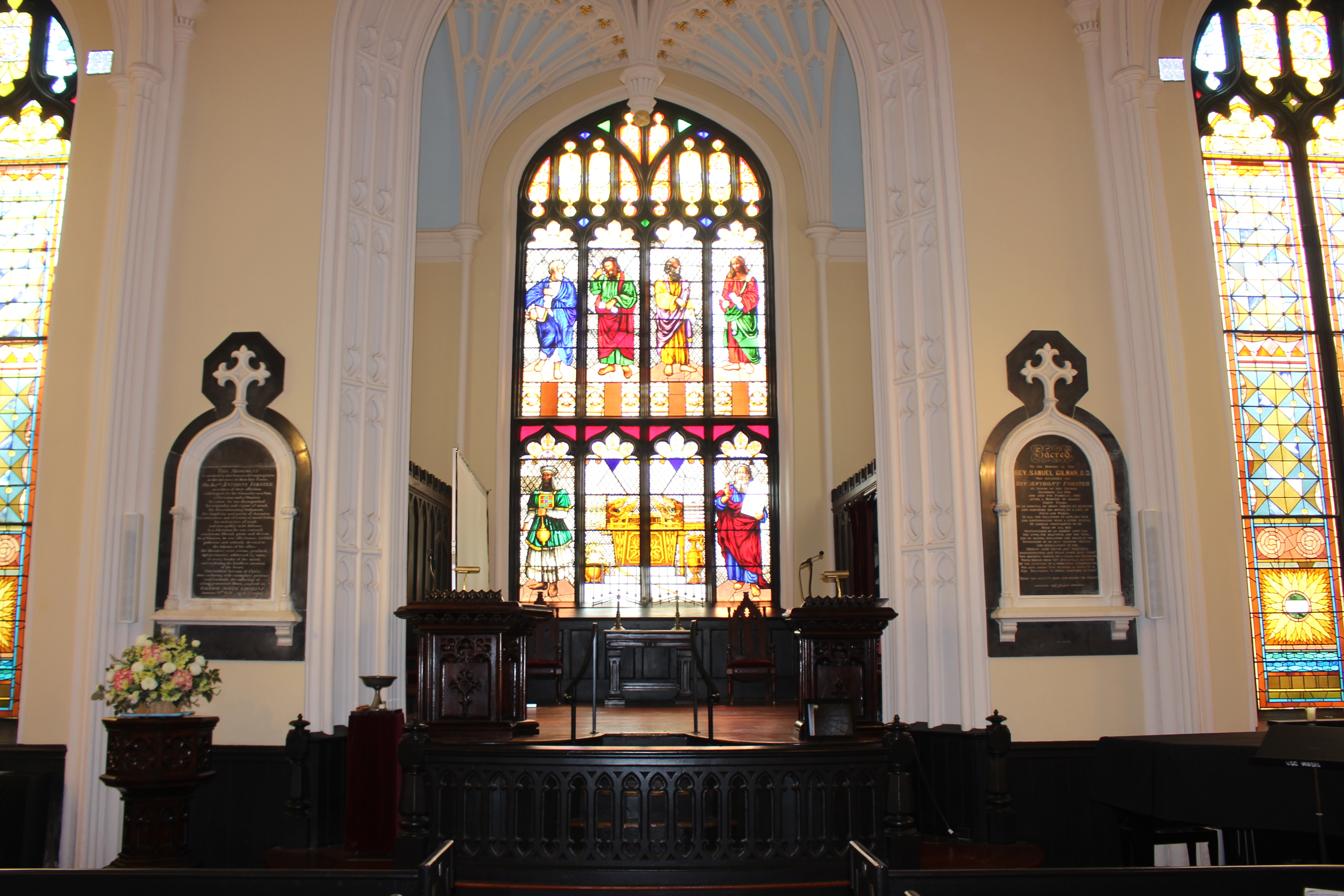
Painted glass depicting the four gospel writers, Aaron, Moses, and the Ark of the Covenant

The large Chancel window was manufactured by the Henry E. Sharp glass works of Brooklyn, New York in 1854. The two side windows in the Chancel are also by the same glass works and are mostly painted and etched glass. The main window, created from painted glass, depicts both the old and new testaments, with Moses and Aaron flanking the Ark of the Covenant in the lower portion and the four Gospel writers arranged above them.

The interior of the building was furnished with pews, pulpit, lectern, and communion rail, all carved from or capped with walnut. Gas lighting was also installed at this time. In recent times, a handrail created by Philip Simons was added.

== Civil War and natural disasters ==
During the Civil War, many members left Charleston and the church closed its doors until 1865. Shortly after the war began, the Great Charleston Fire of 1861 swept across the peninsula, destroying five churches and coming within two blocks of the Unitarian Church. During the 18-month Federal bombardment of Charleston that began in August 1863, the church was within range of the Union batteries but again remained unscathed.

Charleston surrendered to Union troops on February 15, 1865, and the church began, once again, to hold services. Because many members had lost their fortunes and/or did not return to Charleston, pew rentals plummeted and the church fell on difficult times, going through seven ministers in the next ten years. Fortunately for the church, one of its members, Alva Gage, had retained most of his money and was generous in sustaining the church through the difficult times.

Meanwhile, the Universalist Church in Charleston closed and was sold in the late 1850's with the money invested. After the war the remaining members joined the Unitarian Church and donated their funds to the repair of the church. It was not until 1961 that Unitarians and Universalists officially merged into the Unitarian Universalist Association, but clearly there was an affinity much earlier than that!

Although the church was fortunate in suffering no major damage during the Civil War, that came to an end during two natural disasters in 1885 and 1886. The Cyclone of 1885 hurricane in 1885, with winds of 125 mph, bore down on Charleston, creating havoc and blowing out all of the windows in the Nave of the church .

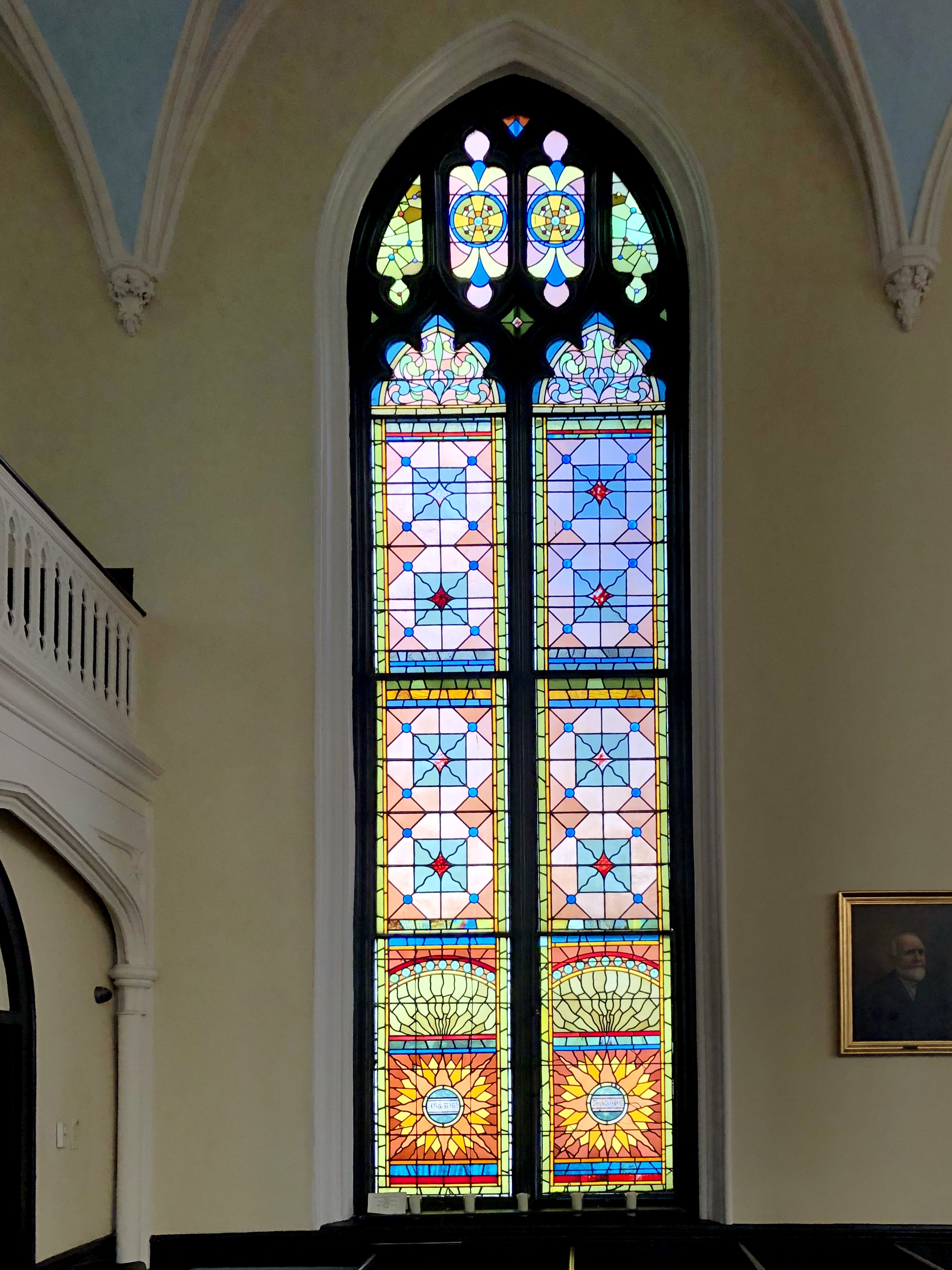
Side windows from 1885

The new side windows, donated by Unitarian churches in Boston, are in the Art Nouveau style and contrast sharply with the traditional windows in the Chancel. These windows are solid stained glass and were manufactured by Redding, Baird & Company of Boston, Mass. These windows, too, carry the theme of old and new testaments with the words “The Lord is One” written in Hebrew and “Spirit of God” written in Greek.

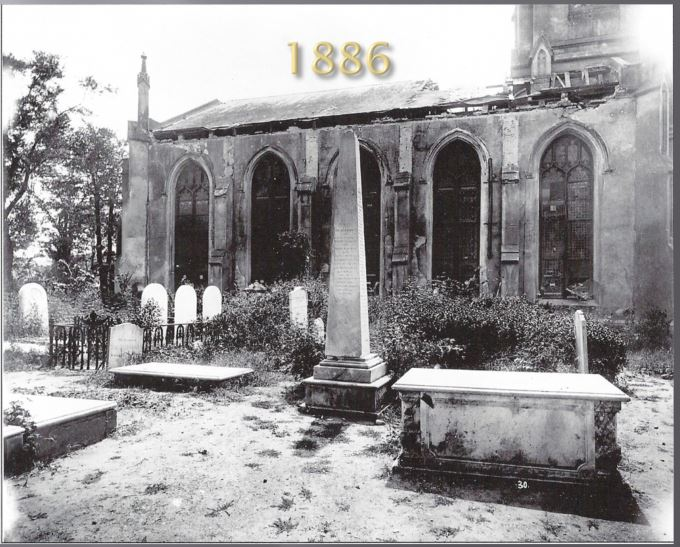
Upper portion of the church tower fell through the roof

The next year, the great Charleston earthquake of 1886 (7.3 on the moment magnitude scale) devastated the city of Charleston and caused major damage to the Unitarian Church. The entire top of the church tower, including eight paneled buttresses, high pinnacles, and medieval-style finials, fell into the Nave of the church, leaving a gaping hole in the roof and destroying part of the famed fan-vaulted ceiling. Fortunately for the church, Unitarians from across the country generously donated $17,000 to the rebuilding effort, much of which was later repaid. Boston architect Thomas Silloway restored the interior to Francis Lee's original design. The tower, however, was rebuilt in a slightly less elaborate form with the pinnacles and parapet lowered and simplified. This was to increase structural stability in the event another earthquake struck Charleston.

More than one hundred years passed before Charleston faced another natural disaster of similar scope. In 1989, Hurricane Hugo destroyed about 30 mature trees in the churchyard. These trees were replaced with a lower growing canopy of dogwood, halesia (silverbell), crepe myrtle, and Japanese maple. More than 60 tombstones were also damaged in that storm, but age and weather have also taken their toll. The Larrisey Gravestone Conservation Project, named for former member, M. Maxine Larrisey, was established for their repair and 65 have been refurbished.

== Campus ==
Today, the 1.3-acre campus includes the church, a lovely churchyard, Gage Hall, and a Religious Education Annex. The Sanctuary is often referred to as the Landmark as it was named a National Historical Landmark in 1976. In 2005, the outside of the building was cleaned, sealed and resurfaced, and in 2010, the inside was also repaired and repainted. It remains today a fine example of fan-vaulting and, with its lovely painted and stained-glass windows, is a pleasant place to sit in quiet contemplation.

The churchyard is an oasis of greenery in the middle of Charleston, accessed via an inviting walkway from King Street or through gates on Archdale. It is also now part of Charleston's Gateway Walk. Despite myths to the contrary, nobody famous is buried in the churchyard, but the gravesites and other areas are planted with a variety of trees, bushes and plants such that there are flowers blooming at every season of the year. Camellias and roses grace the area around the sundial adjacent to a monument honoring Samuel and Caroline Gillman. The churchyard is part of Charleston’s Gateway Walk

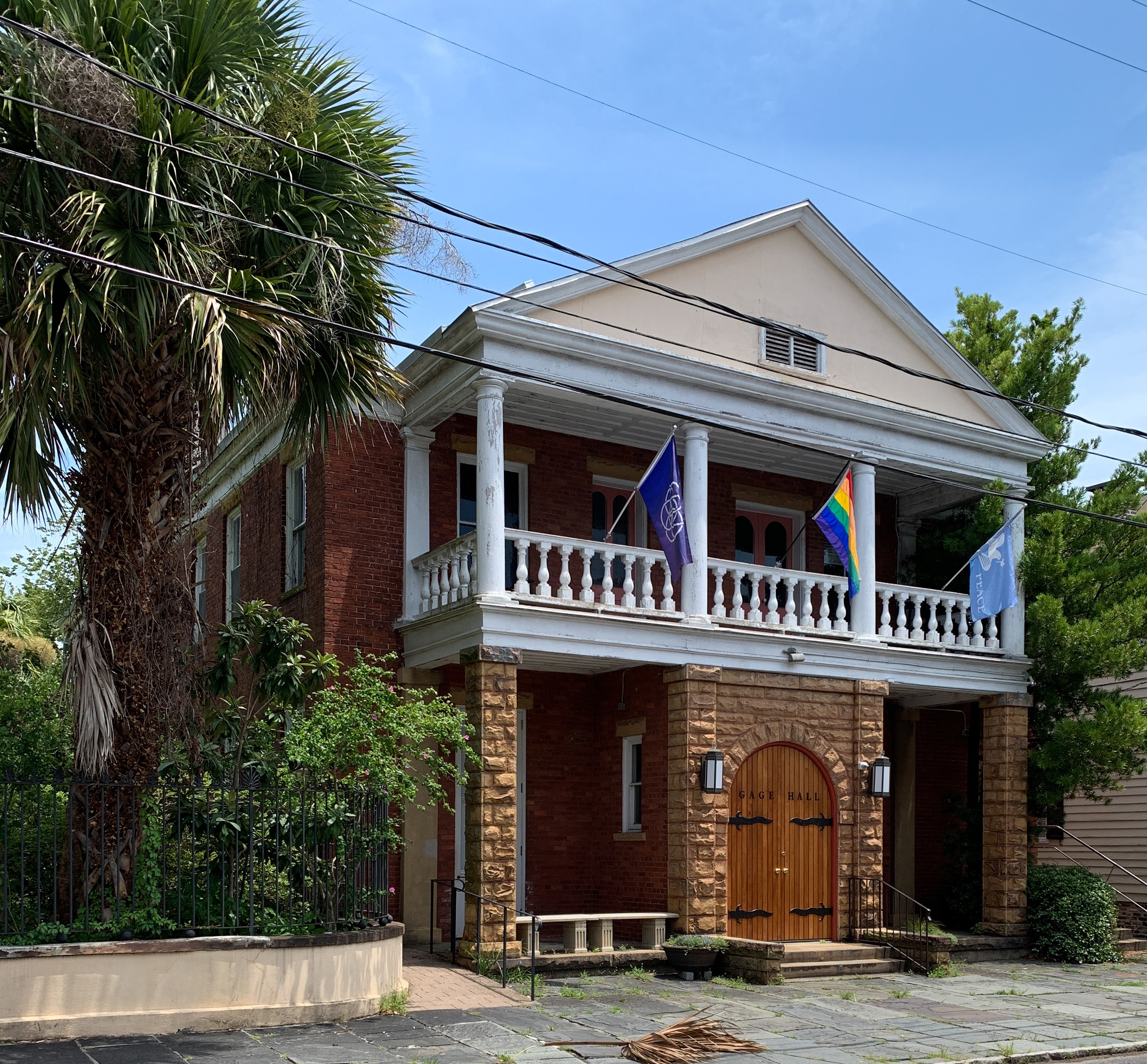
Gage Hall, South of the churchyard. Offices, meeting rooms, and social hall.

Across the churchyard from the Sanctuary stands Gage Hall, a parish house built in 1893 that provides spaces for church offices, meetings, and religious education as well as concerts and receptions. It was once the site of the Gage Hall debates, a series of discussions on controversial topics that was broadcast on radio during the 1960s. The heavy duty range in the kitchen was bought for the church when it hosted one of the first Head Start programs in Charleston. Volunteers from the congregation helped teach and provided lunches for the children. Today, coffeehouse concerts are held regularly to fund field trips for inner city school children.

Gage Hall was named for Alva Gage, the main supporter of the church for many years. He provided funds for the building, specifying how it was to be used, and left much of his fortune to the church. He is buried in the churchyard.

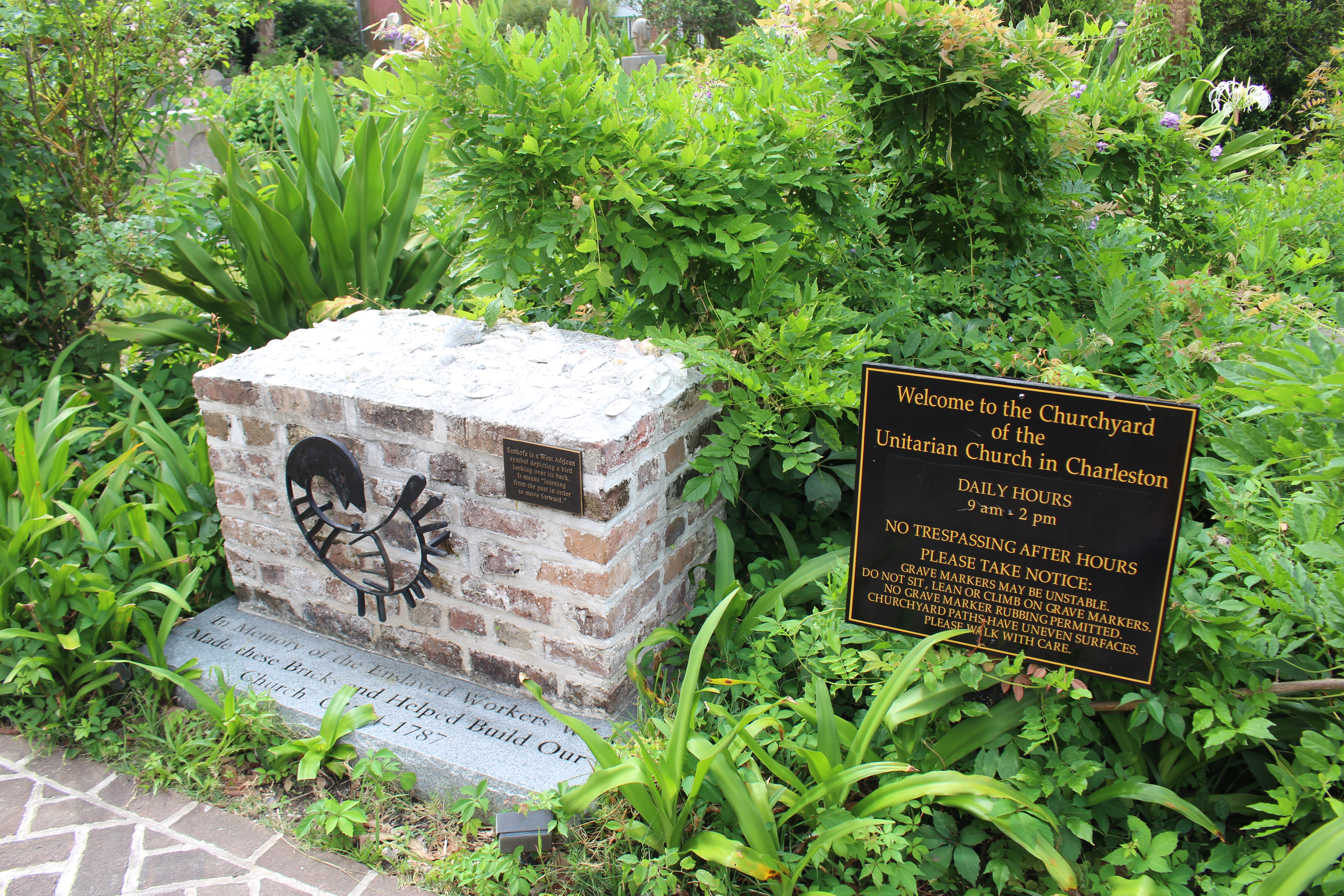
Monument to enslaved workers made from original bricks

In 2013, a passage was cut through the wall of the entryway to provide wheelchair access to the sanctuary. This required the removal of many of the original bricks. The congregation decided to use the bricks that were removed to build a memorial to the enslaved people who worked to build the church. The memorial is in the churchyard near the church entrance. Affixed to the front is a metal bird looking backwards. It is a Sankofa, which is an African symbol meaning “learning from the past in order to move forward”. An inscription dedicates the monument to “the enslaved workers who made these bricks and helped build our church."

== See also ==
- Unitarian Universalist Association
- List of National Historic Landmarks in South Carolina
- National Register of Historic Places listings in Charleston, South Carolina

The Religious Education Annex, located behind Gage Hall, was constructed in 1997-98 as a classroom building with an apartment above for the church sexton.
