= Buildings in the Charleston Historic District =

Buildings in the historic area of Charleston, South Carolina, US

The Charleston Historic District is a large urban U.S. historic district in Charleston, South Carolina that consists of most of the historic peninsular heart of the city. It was the first historic district designated by any government in the U.S., when it was established in 1931. The district was expanded, then it was designated a National Historic Landmark District in 1960. A further expanded area was listed on the National Register of Historic Places in 1966.

The district covers most of the historic peninsular heart of the city and contains an unparalleled collection of 18th and 19th-century architecture, including many distinctive Charleston "single houses". It was declared to be a National Historic Landmark in 1960.

According to the New York Preservation Archive Project, the Charleston Old and Historic District's creation in 1931 established "the first historic district protected by local legislation in the United States and inspired legal protection of historic sites in New York City."

The district was about 770 acres (1.20 sq mi; 3.1 km^{2}) in area in 1966. Maps of the original 1931 district (which became a National Historic Landmark in 1960), the expansion of that National Historic Landmark district in 1966, and the greater area covered in the 1975 listing on the National Register of Historic Places, are on pages 281-84 of NARA collection. What NARA currently provides at "Charleston Historic District" is very different from a regular NRHP or NHL submission; it includes no NRHP or NHL forms at all. Instead it includes much correspondence relating to the designation of the Charleston Historic District as an NHL. It in fact includes the nationwide study of which places were obviously eligible for NHL designation in 1960, a list including the Charleston Historic District. This was conveyed in an October 9, 1960, release from U.S. Secretary of the Interior Fred A. Seaton (pages 36–55). This includes a nationwide list of sites eligible (p. 38-53). An outline of themes identified in the National Survey of Historic Sites and Buildings (which the National Park Service? was authorized to undertake in 1935 legislation) is (p. 54-55). (Charleston Mayor J. Palmer Gaillard, Jr. formally accepted the designation in 1962; not all other NHL candidate places did.) Includes correspondence, photos, plans, more.

At least 46 buildings in the district have been documented by the Historic American Buildings Survey (HABS).

Below is a partial list of relevant buildings inside the Charleston Historic District:

== Selected contributing properties ==
Name	Image	Address	Dates	Note
"Pink House", 17 Chalmers Street		17 Chalmers Street; 32.77756°N 79.92895°W	1694-1712; HABS-doc'd	Second-oldest house in Charleston, built of pink Bermuda stone.
59 Smith Street (House)		59 Smith Street; 32.78147°N 79.94119°W	HABS-doc'd	
74 Rutledge Avenue (House)		74 Rutledge Avenue, at Wentworth St. 32.77949°N 79.94136°W	HABS-doc'd	
Bank of South Carolina aka "Chamber of Commerce" aka "Citizens and Southern National Bank Building"		50 Broad St. 32.77684°N 79.92943°W	HABS-doc'd	
Bank of United States, now City Hall		NE corner Broad and Meeting Sts. 32.77672°N 79.93083°W	HABS-doc'd	
Governor Thomas Bennett House		89 Smith St. 32.78316°N 79.94222°W	1825 built HABS-doc'd	Interior features one of only two cantilevered staircases in Charleston. HABS-listed
William Blacklock House		18 Bull St. 32.78305°N 79.93949°W	HABS-doc'd	
William Blacklock Carriage House		18 Bull St. 32.78329°N 79.93951°W	HABS-doc'd	
Blacklock Gazebo		18 Bull St. 32.78330°N 79.93974°W	HABS-doc'd	Garden pavilion, about 10 by 14 feet (3.0 m × 4.3 m), brick laid in Flemish Bond, built probably same time as house.
Daniel Blake Tenement		2-4 Courthouse Square	HABS-doc'd	
Major Peter Bocquet Jr. House		95 Broad St. 32.77625°N 79.93223°W	c.1962 HABS-doc'd	3½-story house, about 30 by 58 feet (9.1 m × 17.7 m) in plan
Charleston County Courthouse		NW corner Broad and Meeting Sts. 32°46′35.814″N 79°55′52.752″W	1790-92 built HABS-doc'd	
Alexander Robert Chisholm House		6 Montague St. 32.78219°N 79.93852°W	HABS-doc'd	
College of Charleston's Randolph Hall		66 George St. 32.78402°N 79.93740°W	HABS-doc'd	
County Records Building, aka "Fireproof Building"		100 Meeting St. at Chalmers St. 32.77720°N 79.93091°W	1822–27 built NRHP 1969; NHL 1973; HABS-doc'd	Earliest "Fireproof Building" in the United States, designed by Robert Mills, now the South Carolina Historical Society.
Exchange Building and Custom House		122-26 East Bay St. 32.77690°N 79.92688°W	1973 NHL; HABS-doc'd	Now a museum
Farmers' and Exchange Bank		141 E. Bay St. 32°46′39.5″N 79°55′38″W	1854 built NRHP 1983; NHL 1983; HABS-doc'd	
Gate, 96 Ashley Ave.		96 Ashley Ave. 32.77982°N 79.94349°W	HABS-doc'd	In 2021 Google Streetview imagery, the wrought-iron fence appears intact but the gate has been removed.
Glebe House, aka St. Philip's Parsonage House aka Bishop Robert Smith House		6 Glebe St. 32.78211°N 79.93634°W	HABS-doc'd	"A fine eighteenth-century mansion which was the home of the first Episcopal Bishop of South Carolina, and nucleus of the College of Charleston." Now "President's House"?
Glebe Street Presbyterian Church, now the Mount Zion AME Methodist Church		7 Glebe St. 32.78222°N 79.93693°W	HABS-doc'd	
Dr. Joseph Glover House		81 Rutledge Avenue; 32.77989°N 79.94205°W	HABS-doc'd	
Harvey-Lining House and Pharmacy		Broad St. at King St. 32.77644°N 79.93287°W	HABS-doc'd	
Hibernian Hall (Charleston, South Carolina)		105 Meeting St. 32°46′38″N 79°55′54″W	HABS-doc'd	
Kings Courtyard Inn		198 King Street; 32.7796°N 79.9329°W	1833 built	Now a boutique hotel, its building was designed by architect Francis D. Lee mainly in Greek Revival style but with elements of Egyptian Revival.
T. B. Seabrook House		95 Rutledge Avenue; 32.78076°N 79.94252°W	HABS-doc'd	

== See also ==
- List of historic houses and buildings in Savannah, Georgia
- Historic Savannah Foundation
