= Believe Me, If All Those Endearing Young Charms =

Irish song published in 1808

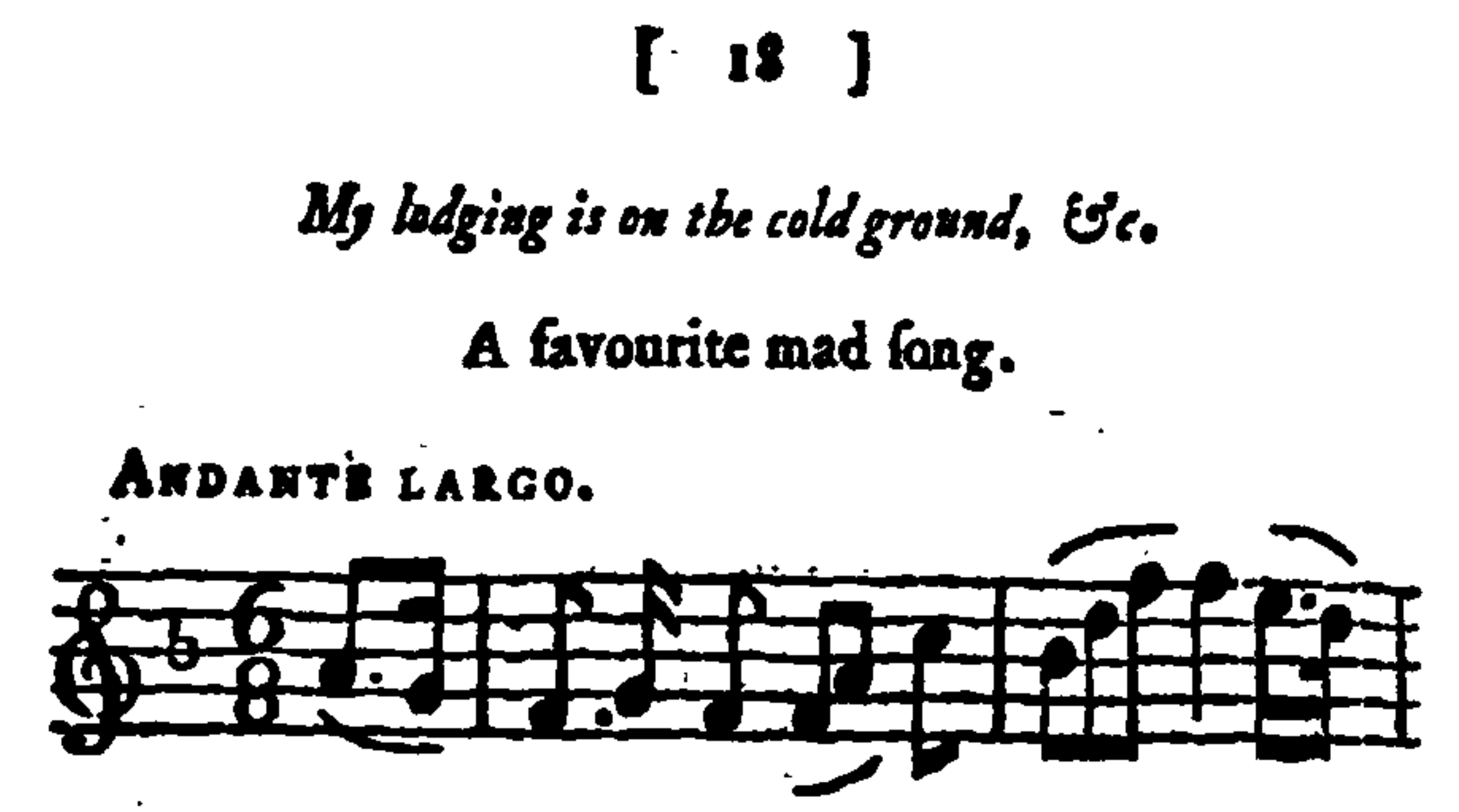
Incipit of "My lodging is on the cold ground" from a 1775 printing.

"Believe Me, If All Those Endearing Young Charms"
Instrumental, United States Air Force Band of the Rockies, Stellar Brass, 2007

"Believe Me, If All Those Endearing Young Charms" is the common title of a traditional song. The composer of the melody is unknown, but the tune is familiar worldwide. The song may have originated in England, Scotland, or Ireland.

In the late 17th century, the melody was set to William Davenant's poem "My Lodging is on the cold Ground". In 1808, Irish poet Thomas Moore wrote new lyrics for the song which endure as the most famous version.

== History ==
Prior to Thomas Moore's lyrics, the song was widely known as "My Lodging is on the cold Ground". The title derives from William Davenant's 1664 play The Rivals. In the fifth act, mad Celania sings a lament. Matthew Locke composed a melody for Davenant's poem. Somewhere around 1670, Locke's melody was discarded and Davenant's lyric was paired with a different tune.

The new tune for Davenant's lyric may have been a traditional Irish melody. W. H. Grattan Flood suggested the traditional melody was known as both "As fadda annso me" (Long am I here) and "The Gentle Maiden". The song circulated widely in Ireland. It appeared in a 1773 arrangement by Charles Thomas Carter and another in 1776 by Tommaso Giordani. In 1778, a Dublin newspaper advertisement called "My Lodging is on the cold Ground" an "Irish favorite".

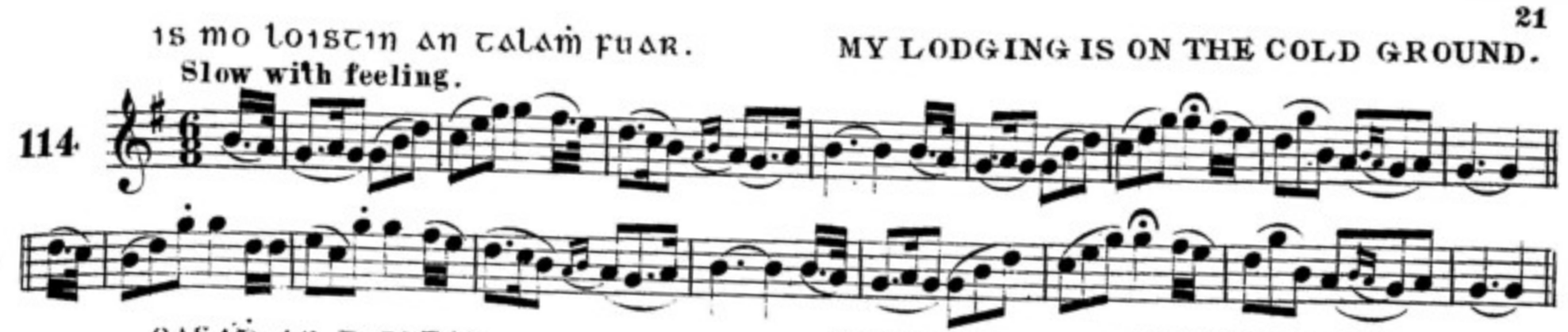
"My Lodging Is On The Cold Ground" as it appears in O'Neill's Music of Ireland (1905).

In Aloys Fleischmann's massive catalogue of Irish traditional music, he documented the appearance of "My Lodging Is on the Cold Ground" (#2393, 2048, 2487, 3115, 3500, 4022, 4769, 5023, 6084, 6382) in several manuscripts and anthologies, such as The Edinburgh Musical Miscellany (1793), The Vocal Magazine (1799), and O'Farrell's Pocket Companion (1804–16). There are two closely related versions of the melody. Fleischmann also noted the tune's appearance under different titles: "I Lo’e Nae a Laddie but Ane" (#2303, 2990, 3114, 5569), "Irish Mad Song" (#2830), "Farewell Thou Fare Day" (#3099), "O' Tis Sweet When the Moon" (#5761), "Oh! I Am the Boy to Be Easy" (#6592). The version of "The Gentle Maiden" (Is fadda anso me - Long am I here) (#6066) that Fleischmann catalogues has a distantly related melody.

In 1775, the song appeared in the English compilation Vocal Music, or the Songster's Companion. William Chappell included it in his 1855 survey of popular music, which cemented the common understanding that the melody was English. The tune has been claimed by England, Scotland, and Ireland.

In the early 19th century, Galway publisher James Power commissioned the multi-volume A Selection of Irish Melodies. Part of the goal was to reclaim melodies that were growing famous abroad without attribution of their Irish origin. John Andrew Stevenson composed arrangements for the songs, and Thomas Moore was tasked with giving them words. Power's strategy was to rescue the tunes from obscurity by making them attractive to singers.

"Believe Me, If All Those Endearing Young Charms" is found in the second volume of the series. "My Lodging is on the cold Ground" is acknowledged as the traditional title.

== Lyrics ==
"Believe Me, If All those Endearing Young Charms" has been described as one of the world's great love songs. A common notion is that Moore's words are an expression of love to his wife who was scarred by smallpox.

Believe me, if all those endearing young charms,
Which I gaze on so fondly to-day,
Were to change by to-morrow, and fleet in my arms,
Like fairy-gifts fading away,—
Thou wouldst still be ador'd as this moment thou art,
Let thy loveliness fade as it will;
And, around the dear ruin each wish of my heart
Would entwine itself verdantly still!

It is not while beauty and youth are thine own,
And thy cheeks unprofan'd by a tear,
That the fervour and faith of a soul can be known,
To which time will but make thee more dear!
Oh! the heart, that has truly lov'd, never forgets,
But as truly loves on to the close;
As the sun-flower turns on her god, when he sets,
The same look which she turn'd when he rose!

== Legacy ==
The traditional melody of "My Lodging is on the cold Ground" and "Believe Me, If All Those Endearing Young Charms" is a cultural touchstone found in a wide variety of genres and media.

In 1791, Robert Burns wrote "Farewell, Thou Fair Day" to a tune from the Isle of Skye called "Song of Death" (Oran an Aoig). When George Thomson anthologized Burns' poem a decade later in A Select Collection of Original Scottish Airs for the Voice, he had Ignaz Pleyel set it to "My Lodging is on the cold Ground".

Arrangements of the song are included in Joseph Haydn's A Collection of Scottish Airs, Volume 2, Hob. XXXIa:262, Mauro Giuliani's 6 Irish National Airs, Op. 124; and Carl Czerny's Die Schule des Vortrags und der Verzierungen, Vol I no. 3, Op. 575.

At Fay House in 1838, Samuel Gilman set the melody to a new set of lyrics in celebration of Harvard University's 200th anniversary. Gilman's "Fair Harvard" became the college's alma mater.

Jemima Luke's 1841 hymn "I think when I read that sweet story of old" is set to the melody.

During the American Civil War in 1862, drum major George B. Bruce collaborated with Daniel D. Emmett on The Drummer's and Fifer's Guide, which includes instructions on how to perform a military tattoo as a signal for bedtime. The tattoo includes several tunes like "New Tatter Jack", "Downfall of Paris", as well as "My Lodging's on the Cold Ground".

In the 19th century, "Endearing Young Charms" became a popular theme for variations by a wide range of composers. Louis Drouet's "Introduction and Variations on an English Theme for Flute and Harp" is based on the tune. William Vincent Wallace composed a fantasy for piano on the melody. Simone Mantia's 1908 variations on the melody are a staple of the euphonium repertoire.

Victor Herbert quotes the tune in "Irish Rhapsody" (1910).

Little Virgie (Shirley Temple) sings the song to her father (John Boles) in the 1935 film The Littlest Rebel. It is used in John Ford's The Informer (1935). The first verse was sung by Alfalfa in a 1936 episode of MGM's The Little Rascals titled Bored of Education.

The song inspired the title of Edward Chodorov's 1943 Broadway play which was later filmed by Lewis Allen. In Those Endearing Young Charms (1945), Larry Burke sings the title song. Walter Huston plays the melody on the harmonica in the film The Treasure of the Sierra Madre. Debbie Reynolds and Barbara Ruick sing the first stanza in the 1953 film The Affairs of Dobie Gillis.

Booby Traps (1944), featuring Private Snafu.

"Endearing Young Charms" became a staple of Warner Bros. Cartoons, first appearing in the 1944 Private Snafu short Booby Traps. Snafu tries to peck out the melody with one finger on a piano but keeps ending on the wrong note. The key is attached to a stick of dynamite, and when Snafu finally gets the song right he blows himself up. The booby trap became a recurring gag for Warner Bros. animation. In Friz Freleng's 1951 Merrie Melodies short Ballot Box Bunny, Yosemite Sam wires a piano in the same manner, and when Bugs Bunny repeatedly plays the wrong note, an infuriated Sam shows Bugs how to play the tune correctly and blows himself up. Freleng revisited the joke in his 1957 Looney Tunes short Show Biz Bugs, where Daffy Duck rigs a xylophone to blow up Bugs Bunny. In the 1965 Wile E. Coyote and the Road Runner cartoon Rushing Roulette, Coyote beckons Road Runner with a "Learn to play piano FREE" sign with the usual results. The gag reappears in 1994's Chariots of Fur and in "Slappy Goes Walnuts", a 1993 episode of Animaniacs which introduces Slappy Squirrel. South Park paid homage to the joke in the 2010 episode "Crippled Summer".

Joni James covered the song on her album Joni Sings Irish Favorites (1959), and it appears in a medley on Bing Crosby's 101 Gang Songs (1961).

"Endearing Young Charms" turned up in The Andy Griffith Show episode "Rafe Hollister Sings" (1963). An instrumental version of the song plays around the midpoint of the 1963 Twilight Zone episode "Passage on the Lady Anne". In The Adams Chronicles (1976), the song is performed at a Christmas party at the beginning of "Chapter VIII: John Quincy Adams, Secretary of State". In "Birth of a Keaton, Part 1" on Family Ties (1984), Elyse Keaton (Meredith Baxter) goes into labor while singing the song's high note during a fundraiser for her husband's public television station.

During his 1973 Harvard lecture series "The Unanswered Question", Leonard Bernstein used the university's alma mater to ruminate on how humanity might have developed polyphony.

Dexys Midnight Runners' considered using the song as a title for their 1982 album Too-Rye-Ay. A snatch of the song is audible at the close of the album's final song "Come On Eileen".

== Anthologies ==
"Believe Me, If All Those Endearing Young Charms" and its antecedent "My Lodging is in the cold Ground" have been heavily anthologized:

- Vocal Music, or the Songster's Companion. London: Baker and Galabin, 1775.
- Corri, Domenico. A new & complete collection of the most favourite Scots songs. Edinburgh: Corri & Sutherland, c. 1783.
- A Selection of Scotch, English, Irish and Foreign Airs, Volume First. Glasgow: James Aird, 1790.
- The Edinburgh Musical Miscellany, Volume II. Edingburgh: John Elder, T. Brown, and C. Elliot, 1793.
- The Vocal Magazine, Volume II. Edinburgh: C. Stewart, 1798.
- Select Collection of Original Scottish Airs, Volume II. Edinburgh: G. Thomson, 1801. 76f.
- O'Farrell's Pocket Companion for the Irish or Union Pipes. 1804.
- Murphy, John. A Collection of Irish Airs and Jiggs with Variations. London, 1809.
- Smith, Robert Archibald. The Irish Minstrel. Edinburgh: Robt. Purdie, 1825.
- Clinton, John. Gems of Ireland. Edinburgh, c. 1840.
- O'Neill's Music of Ireland. Chicago: Lyon & Healy, 1903.
- Quilter, Roger. Arnold Book of Old Songs. Boosey & Hawkes, 1950.
