= Flute method =

Textbook-style method of learning to play the flute

In music pedagogy, a flute method is a type of specific textbook-style pedagogy for learning to play the flute. It often contains fingering charts, scales, exercises, and occasionally etudes. These exercises are often presented in different keys in ascending order to aid in difficulty, known as methodical progression, or to focus on isolated aspects like fluency, rhythm, dynamics, and articulation. Duets or recital pieces may with accompaniment are often included as well for students to perform. Classical literature of this nature differs from étude books in that the former is meant as a linear course for a student to follow with consistent guidance, whereas volumes of études could be argued to be not as comprehensive.

As typical instrumental methods are meant to function as textbooks that supporting a private teacher rather than to facilitate self-teaching, and thus usually includes no basic or special playing techniques are covered in any depth. Detailed instructions in this respect are only found in special, autodidactical methods.

Some methods are specially tailored for students on certain skill levels, which is in contrast to a complete method, sometimes in multiple volumes, meant to accompany the student until he or she becomes an advanced player.

Methods of certain authors or editors have achieved the status of standard works and are published or reissued by different publishing companies in new layouts or arrangements. The Suzuki Method, originally written to teach violin, is one of the most widely used method books.

== Historical ==
=== 17th Century ===
- Playford, John, The Delightful Companion or Choice new Lessons for The Recorder or Flute

=== 18th Century ===
- Corrette, Michel, Méthode raisonnée pour apprendre aisément à jouër de la Flûtte Traversiere (1740)
- Hotteterre, Jacques, Principes de la flute traversiere, de la Flute a Bec, et du Haut-bois, Op.1 (Amsterdam: Estienne Roger, 1728)
- Lorenzoni, Antonio, Saggio per ben sonare il flautotraverso con alcune notizie generali ed utili per qualunque strumento, ed altre concernenti la storia della musica (Vicenza: Per F. Modena, 1779)
- Pearson, William, The Compleat Musick-Master (1722)
- Quantz, Johann Joachim, Versuch einer anweisung die flöte traversiere zu spielen. (1752)
- Heron, Luke, A treatise on the German flute. (1771)
- Tromlitz, Johann George, Unterricht der flöte zu spielen (1791)

=== 19th Century ===
- Altes, Henry, Method for the Boehm flute.
- Berbiguier, Benoit Tranquille, Flute method.
- Dressler, Rafael, New and complete instructions for the flute, Op. 68. (1827)
- Drouet, Louis, Method of flute playing. (1830)
- Fürstenau, Anton Bernhard, Flöten-schule, Op. 42. (1826)
- Fürstenau, Anton Bernhard, Die kunst des Flötenspiels, Op.138. (1844)
- Hugot and Wunderlich, Méthode de flûte. (1804)
- Lindsay, Thomas, The elements of flute-playing. (1830)
- Monzani, Tebaldo, Instructions for the german flute. (1801)
- Peraut, Mathieu, Méthode pour la flûte. (1800)
- Soussmann, Heinrich, Grosse praktische Flötenschule Op. 53 (Leipzig 1841)
- Wagner, Ernest, Foundation to flute playing.
- Wragg, Jacob, Improved_Flute_Preceptor... op. 6 (First Edition 1800?)

== Modern ==
=== Early 20th century ===
- De Lorenzo, Leonardo. L'Indispensabile – A complete modern school for the flute. (1912)
- Taffanel, Paul and Gaubert, Philippe. Methode complete de flute. (1923)

=== Mid to Late 20th Century ===
- Suzuki, Shinichi and Takahashi, Toshio The Suzuki Method for flute. (c.1972)
- Toff, Nancy (1996). The Flute Book: A Complete Guide for Students and Performers (second ed.). Oxford and New York: Oxford University Press.

== See also ==
- Method (music)
- Flute
- Western concert flute
- Suzuki method
- Music education
