= Old Colleton County Jail =

United States historic library

- U.S. National Register of Historic Places
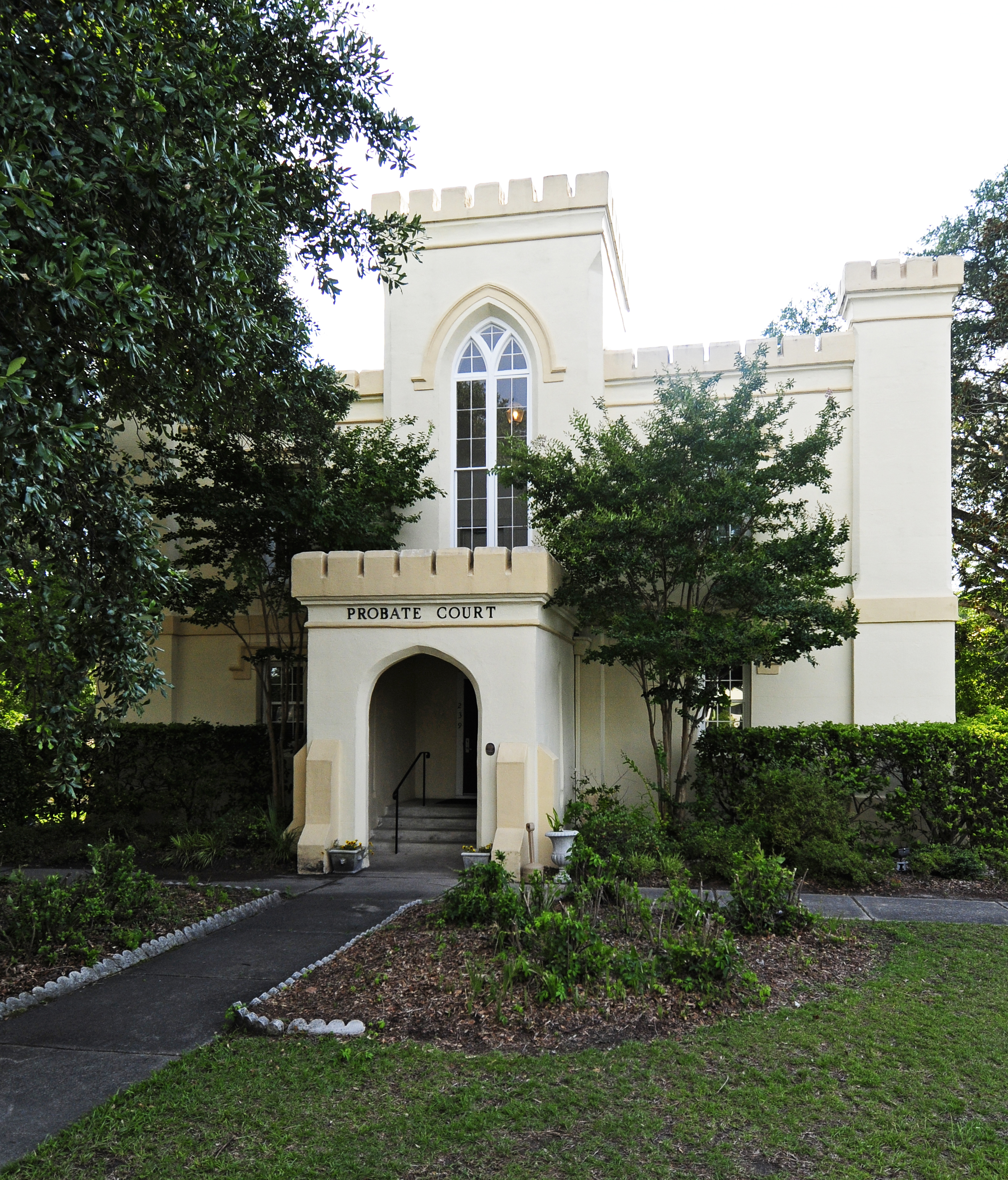
- Old Colleton County Jail, June 2012

- Location within South Carolina Location within the United States
- Location: Jeffries Blvd., Walterboro, South Carolina
- Coordinates: 32°54′25″N 80°39′20″W
- Area: 0.8 acres (0.32 ha)
- Built: 1856
- Architect: Jones, Edward C.; Lee, Francis D.
- Architectural style: Neo-Gothic
- NRHP reference No.: 71000766
- Added to NRHP: May 14, 1971

Old Colleton County Jail is a historic library building located at Walterboro, Colleton County, South Carolina. It was built in 1856, and is a stuccoed brick building in the Gothic Revival style. The building was designed by noted Charleston architects, Edward C. Jones and Francis D. Lee. The jail in part resembles a miniature, fortified castle. The front façade has crenellated parapets, turret-like structures at either corner, and a massive central tower with a large lancet window above the main entrance.

It was listed in the National Register of Historic Places in 1971.
