= Kings Courtyard Inn =

- U.S. Historic district – Contributing property
- Location within South Carolina Location within the United States
- Location: 198 King St., Charleston, South Carolina
- Coordinates: 32.7796°N 79.9329°W
- Built: 1833
- Architect: Francis D. Lee
- Architectural style: Greek Revival, Egyptian Revival
- Part of: Charleston Historic District (ID66000964)
- Designated CP: October 15, 1966

The Kings Courtyard Inn, at 198 King Street in Charleston, South Carolina, is a boutique hotel with about 41 rooms. In 1989 it was one of the 35 founding members of Historic Hotels of America, a program of the National Trust for Historic Preservation, and it has remained in the program since.

== History ==
The hotel was built in 1853 for Colonel J. Charles Blum, as a three-story antebellum building. It was known as the Blum Building. In the 1800s its first floor was commercial shop spaces, and second and third floors were hotel rooms.

It opened as Kings Courtyard Inn in 1983. A review then noted that it was:

A 130-year-old building which formerly housed retail shops and a roller skating rink has been converted into one of Charleston's newest inns. Kings Courtyard Inn at 198 King St. opened this month in the heart of the port city's antique district, and in conjunction with the opening is sponsoring antique symposiums each Saturday through Dec. 10. ... Erected in 1853 in the Greek revival style with Egyptian detail, the three-story building is one of the oldest and largest in the block. The two upper floors were originally used as an inn, catering to visiting plantation owners and shipping magnates. High-quality shops occupied the ground floor. In later years, millinery, grocery, and antique stores were among the building's tenants, and in the 1930s the third floor became an indoor skating rink.

It was designed by architect Francis D. Lee in Greek Revival style with elements of Egyptian Revival. It includes two inner courtyards and a rear garden. The hotel is a contributing property of the Charleston Historic District, a National Historic Landmark District on the National Register of Historic Places.
