= Eliza Yonge Wilkinson =

American letter-writer (1757–?)

- Born: Eliza Yonge; 7 February 1757; St. Paul's Parish, South Carolina
- Died: Unknown
- Known for: Letter-writer
- Notable work: Letters of Eliza Wilkinson During the Invasion and Possession of Charlestown, S. C. by the British in the Revolutionary War
- Spouse(s): Joseph Wilkinson (married 1774-1775), Peter Porcher (married 1786-1797)
- Children: 5
- Parents: Francis Yonge; Sarah Clifford Yonge
- Relatives: Robert Yonge (grandfather)

Eliza Yonge Wilkinson (1757–?) was an American letter-writer active during the American Revolutionary War. Her letters provide an important historical account of South Carolina during the War and the perspective of gentlewomen. In her writing she balances the horrors of war with humour and self-awareness. Her letters were collected, edited and published by Caroline Gilman in 1839.

== Biography ==
Wilkinson, then Eliza Yonge, was born in South Carolina on 7 February 1757. She was the third child of Francis Yonge, a Welsh immigrant who moved to Yonge's Island in Charleston, South Carolina as the owner of a slave plantation. Wilkinson's two brothers served in the American Army. Her mother was Sarah Clifford Yonge and her grandfather was Robert Yonge, a Carolina Planter and member of the Commons Assembly. Wilkinson may have been married in early 1774 to Joseph Wilkinson, the descendent of another planter family. Together they had one son, Joseph Morton Wilkinson, who died shortly after birth. Joseph Wilkinson died in 1775, six months after he was married to Eliza. After the death of her husband, Wilkinson moved back to Yonge's Island where she was given land by her father and inherited her brother's plantation on Wadmalaw Island.

Wilkinson was a letter-writer who wrote about her experiences of the Revolutionary War. Despite being initially in awe of British soldiers, she soon became a patriot and this awe turned to fear and contempt. Many of Wilkinson's biographical details are revealed only in her letters.

Wilkinson later went on to marry Peter Porcher after the War in 1786. They lived on Peter's plantation at Black Swamp near the Savannah River and had four children. Anything that Wilkinson wrote after this time has not survived.

Her date of death is unknown but it is likely to have been in 1806, because of 1807 court records that indicate both Eliza and her husband were dead, and had left behind four minor children. The court documents pertained to the division of her brother Francis's estate, of which Eliza was an heir. Her husband Peter Porcher died in 1797, as confirmed by his will inventory.

== Writing ==
=== Style and content ===
Wilkinson did not write for publication but for her own amusement and the amusement of others. Before the War of Independence, her letters mainly focus on her life as a plantation woman and how she tended to the physical and emotional wellbeing of those around her.

Wilkinson's letters during the War illustrate her patriotism and her criticism of the British. Wilkinson did not become a patriot, however, until she saw the atrocities of the British first-hand. In her letters, she described the invasion of Charleston in 1779 by the British. She provides a primary account of hiding possessions, fleeing from enemies, and the romantic attention of British soldiers. She also recalls the confusion distinguishing between British and American troops owing to the lack of standardised uniforms. Other entries are notable for their immediacy, such as an interjection in letter X which reads "Bless me! here is a whole troop of British horse coming up to the house; get into my bosom, letter."

Wilkinson's writing shows she was skilled at scene-painting and depicting the characteristics of speech. She utilises irony and humour, such as when explaining her purpose for recounting the 1779 campaign: "As I mean never to forget the loving-kindness and tender mercies of the renowned Britons while among us ...", and when writing about her outbreak of smallpox: "My face is finely ornamented, and my nose honored with thirteen spots." She plays with the juxtaposition of comedy and tragedy endured during war. She uses a Homeric narrative to depict her encounters with violence and horror. In one letter she recounts personal injury in detail: "upon first entering the house, one of them gave my arm such a violent grasp, that he left the print of his thumb and three fingers, in black and white, which was to be seen, very plainly, for several days after."

Wilkinson was conscious of the fact that she should recall her experiences as historically accurate as possible. She was also aware of the social conventions surrounding women's writing and expressed concern at how her letters would be received: "What will the men say if they should see this? I am really out of my sphere now". She believed that women should be able to hold political views. A passage in Letter VI expresses this sentiment: "our [women's] thoughts can soar aloft, we can form conceptions of things of higher nature; and have as just a sense of honor, glory, and great actions, as these 'Lords of the Creation.'" Although Wilkinson was able to take part in political discourse, she maintained her dependence on leading men in society and did not challenge the traditional domesticated role of women. Despite wanting to fight against enslavement at the hands of the British, she did not condemn slavery. There is evidence, however, that Wilkinson had compassion that extended to slaves: in Letter VI she writes of the brutality faced by a Loyalist-owned slave at the hands of her father's servant.

Much of Wilkinson's writing was probably not intended for a specific correspondent. However, Wilkinson did write letters to her friend known as Miss M--- P---, who was most likely Mary Porcher, the half-sister of Peter Porcher.

=== Publications ===
Caroline Gilman collected and edited twelve of Wilkinson's letters, and published them in her magazine Southern Rose Bud. She then went on to publish them in book form entitled Letters of Eliza Wilkinson (1839). Gilman arranged Wilkinson's letters to form a coherent timeline from spring 1779 to Lord Cornwallis's surrender in October 1781. Letters I and II describe the anticipation of the British invasion of the South Carolina Lowcountry. Letters II-VII depict the direct experiences of wartime and violence. In letters VIII-XII, Wilkinson writes of the daily life and mid-War uneasiness. Gilman heavily edited Wilkinson's letters before publication, not only fixing spelling and punctuation but altering vocabulary and writing new passages to portray Wilkinson as more courageous. There are a number of letters that were not published by Gilman, the contents of which depict the social life in Charleston and Wilkinson's ambitions to find a new husband after the death of her first.

George Armstrong Wauchope published an anthology of works, The Writers of South Carolina, in 1910, which included one additional letter from Wilkinson to Mary Porcher.

== Works ==
- Letters of Eliza Wilkinson During the Invasion and Possession of Charlestown, S. C. by the British in the Revolutionary War, ed. Caroline Gilman (1839).
- Letter to Mary Porcher, in The Writers of South Carolina, ed. George Armstrong (1910).
