= Caroline Howard Gilman =

American author (1794-1888)

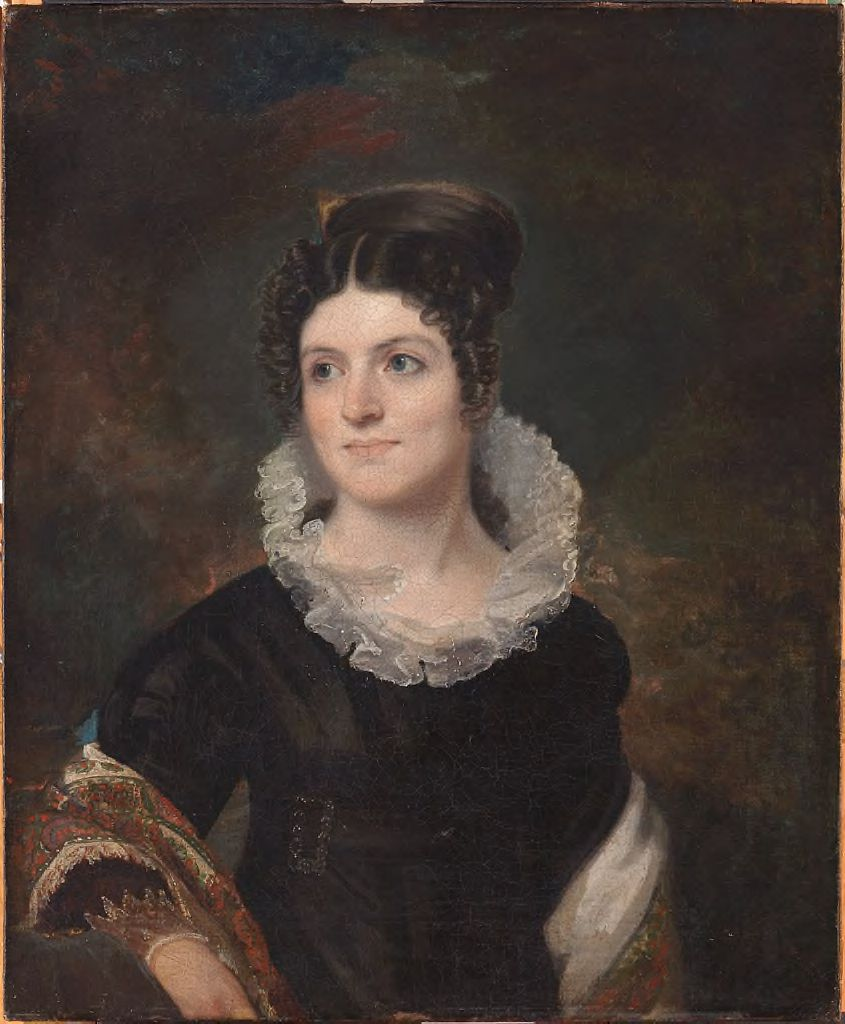
- Caroline Howard Gilman, painted by John Wesley Jarvis, c. 1820
- Born: Caroline Howard; October 8, 1794; Boston, Massachusetts, U.S.
- Died: September 15, 1888 (aged 93); Washington, D.C., U.S.
- Occupation: author
- Spouse: Samuel Gilman (m. 1819; died 1858)
- Children: Caroline H. Jervey, Mrs. Charles J. Bowen (daughters)
- Writing career
- Pen name: Mrs. Clarissa Packard
- Language: English

Caroline Howard Gilman (October 8, 1794 – September 15, 1888), known by her pen name Mrs. Clarissa Packard, was an American author and vocal advocate for slavery. Her writing career spanned 70 years and included poems, novels, and essays.

== Early years and education ==
She was born Caroline Howard in Boston, Massachusetts, on October 8, 1794, the daughter of Samuel and Annie Howard (née Lillie). She was young, when her parents died, and grew up with an older sister and brothers.

She passed her school days at Concord, Cambridge and other towns in her native state of Massachusetts. Despite a poor formal education, she was motivated to teach herself and was granted access to the personal library of her neighbor, Governor Elbridge Gerry.

== Career ==
She began to write poems and stories at a very early age. Howard's first published work was a Bible-inspired poem called "Jephthah's Rash Vow", which was printed without her permission when she was 16 years old. In 1817, she allowed another of her religious poems, "On the Raising of Jairus' Daughter", to be printed in the prestigious North American Review.

In 1819, she married Rev. Samuel Gilman, then a theological student at Harvard University who would later write the institution's alma mater, "Fair Harvard". The couple moved to Charleston, South Carolina, where her husband served as a Unitarian pastor from 1819 to 1858.

In 1832, she began to edit, at Charleston, a juvenile weekly paper she named The Rosebud, and later The Southern Rose. She contributed to it most of the verses, tales, and novels, which were subsequently published in volumes. Aside from this, the paper contained instructions for young slaveholders, and critical reviews of abolitionist literature. Recollections of a Northern Housekeeper originally appeared in The Rosebud, in 1834; and Recollections of a Southern Matron in The Southern Rose, in 1835 and 1836. These, with Ruth Raymond, or Love's Progress, and others of her popular works, passed through many editions, and were much admired for "their practical lessons as well as their genial simplicity and humor." Gilman's purpose for writing her publications Recollections of a Northern Housekeeper and Recollections of a Southern Matron was to showcase the similar dynamic between northern and southern households within America at the time of the Civil War. Her writing was used as a hopeful attempt to regain unity between regions in the United States. She was the author, for several years, of the Lady's Annual Register and Almanac, and wrote also a book entitled The Poetry of Travelling in the United States. Her Verses of a Lifetime she gave to the press in 1849, and published her Oracles from the Poets in 1854, and, still later, The Sibyl, or New Oracles from the Poets, the latter "consisting of passages of verse ingeniously arranged to correspond to numbers which are to be taken at random."

After Dr. Gilman's death in 1858, she resided for a time at Charleston, Cambridge, and subsequently at Tiverton, Long Island, Nova Scotia with her daughter, Mrs. Charles J. Bowen, and other members of the family circle.

In 1872, she and her daughter, Mrs. Caroline H. Jervey, published a small book of Stories and Poems for children, for whom Gilman, all through her life, rendered a literary service. Caroline Jervey was also the author of Poetry and Prose for the Young, 1856, as well as the stories "Vernon Grove", 1859, and "Hannah Courtenay", 1866.

Gilman shared with her husband the toils and satisfactions of his long ministry at Charleston, and shared with him also the gift of song. Several of her hymns have, like his, were used during the service of praise. She was the author of the following hymns:

- "Is there a lone and dreary hour?" (Providence.) Contributed to Sewall's Unitarian Collection, New York City, 1820, in four stanzas of four lines. In 1867, Gilman added a stanza thereto for the Charlestown Services & Hymns. The original hymn was in extensive use amongst the Unitarians in Great Britain and the United States.
- "We bless Thee for this sacred day". (Sunday.) Also contributed to Sewall's Collection, 1820, in four stanzas of four lines, to which another was added by Gilman, for the Charlestown Services & Hymns, 1867. In extensive use.

Caroline Howard Gilman died in Washington, D.C., on September 15, 1888.

== Selected works ==
- Recollections of a New England Housekeeper (1835) (written as Mrs. Clarissa Packard)
- Recollections of a Southern Matron (1836)
- Poetry of Traveling in the United States (1838)
- Tales and Ballads (1839)
- Letters of Eliza Wilkinson, as editor. (1839)
- Ruth Raymond (1840)
- Verses of a Life Time (1849)
- Poems and Stories by a Mother and Daughter (1872), written with her daughter, Mrs. Jervey
