= Col. John A.S. Ashe House =

Coordinates: 32.770638°N 79.931237°W

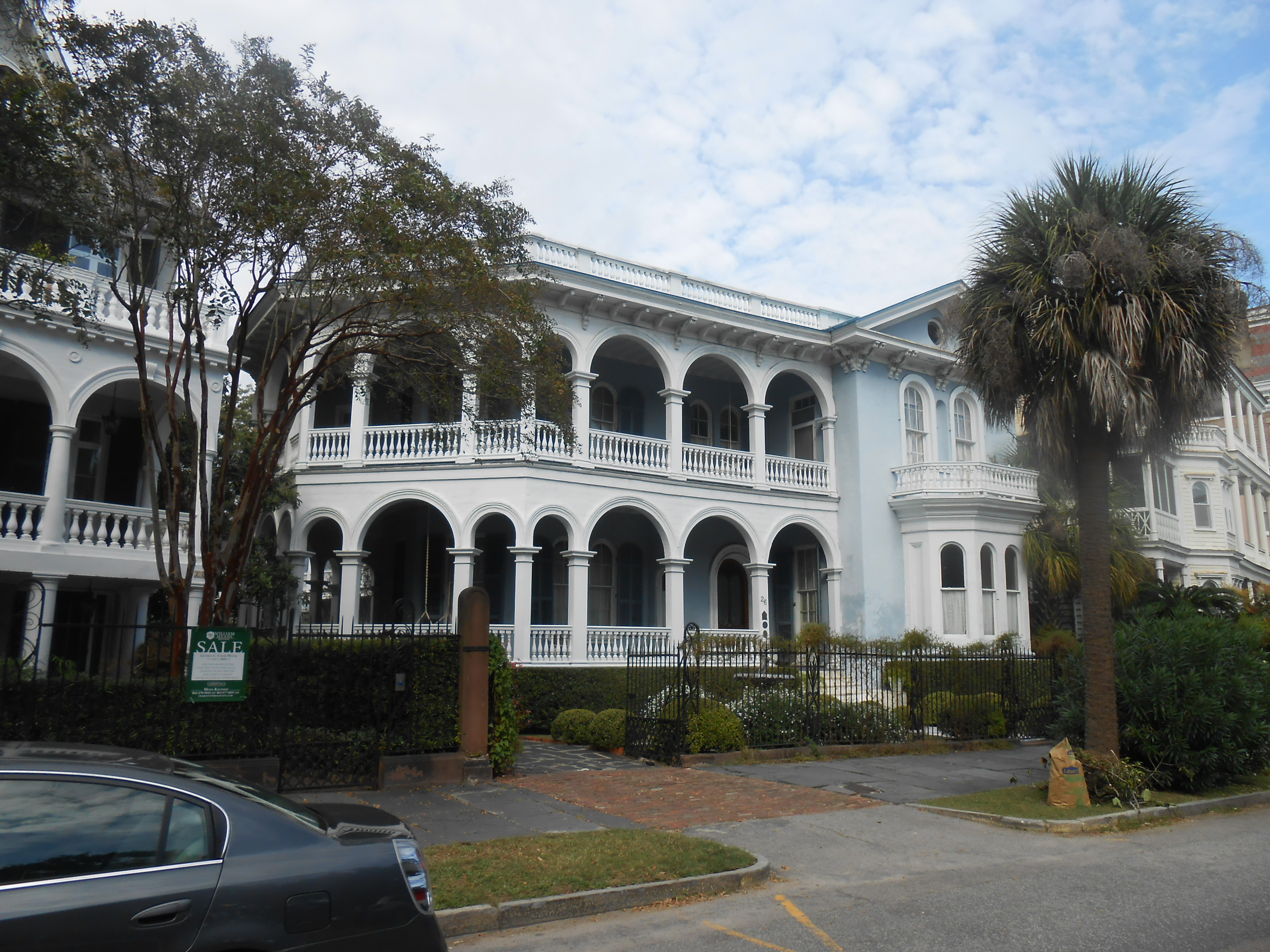
The Col. John A.S. Ashe House at 26 South Battery, Charleston, South Carolina

The Col. John A.S. Ashe House is a historic home in Charleston, South Carolina along Charleston's Battery. Col. John A.S. Ashe, Jr. received the property upon which 26 South Battery is built upon his father's death in 1828 along with $10,000 for the construction of a house. Col. John A.S. Ashe, Jr.'s father had built the nearby Col. John Ashe House at 32 South Battery in the 1780s.

The house he had built by 1853 was designed by Charleston architect Edward C. Jones. It is one of his only extant houses in the Italianate style that swept Charleston in the 1850s. The house features heavy detailing inside the house and an asymmetrical layout of rooms.

It is still privately owned. (as of 2025)
