= Caroline Howard Jervey =

American writer

- Born: Caroline Howard Gilman; June 1, 1823; Charleston, South Carolina, U.S.
- Died: January 29, 1877 (aged 53); Charleston
- Resting place: Magnolia Cemetery, Charleston
- Occupations: author; poet; teacher
- Spouses: John Wilson Glover (m. 1840; died 1846); Lewis (or Louis) Jervey (m. 1865)
- Children: 4
- Relatives: Caroline Howard Gilman (mother)
- Writing career
- Pen name: Caroline Howard

Caroline Howard Jervey (née, Gilman; after first marriage, Glover; after second marriage, Jervey; pen name, Caroline Howard; June 1, 1823 – January 29, 1877) was a 19th-century American author, poet, and teacher. Besides numerous poems and stories for the magazines, she published Vernon Grove and Helen Courtenay's Promise, two volumes of fiction, plus Poetry and Prose for the Young, as well as one book co-authored with her mother, Stories and Poems for children. Sometimes, Jervey used her mother's maiden name as a pen name. For fifteen years, she carried on a successful school in Charleston, South Carolina.

== Early life ==
Caroline Howard Gilman was born in Charleston, South Carolina, June 1, 1823. She was the daughter of Rev. Samuel Gilman, a Unitarian clergyman, and Mrs. Caroline Howard Gilman, the author.

== Career ==
In 1840, she married John Wilson Glover (1823–1846), (Note: Alderman et al. (1910), recorded her first husband's name as Nelson Glover.) a South Carolina planter, and was left a widow in 1846, with three children, one son and two daughters. She returned to her father's house, and immediately began to teach, and for fifteen years carried on a successful school in Charleston.

While engaged in teaching, she wrote papers for magazines, also poems, over the signature of "Caroline Howard"; and her novel, Vernon Grove; or, Hearts as they Are, which appeared serially in the Southern Literary Messenger, and was afterward published by Rudd & Carleton, New York City, passing through several editions, and warmly received by the critics. Vernon Grove was copied for the press at night, after Mrs. Glover was in the school-room all day. Jervey published Poetry and Prose for the Young in 1856.

During the war, she removed to a small apartment in Greenville, South Carolina.

In 1865, (Note: Emerson & Stokes (2017) give the date of her wedding to Lewis Jervey as March 1864.) she married Lewis (or Louis) Jervey (1819-1900), of Charleston. By this marriage, she had one daughter.

About 1870, Jervey was in ill health, which prohibited any literary work, including letter writing. Her novel, Helen Courtenay's Promise, (published by George W. Carleton, New York, 1866,) was prepared for the press by dictation of an hour a day to one of her daughters. In magazine literature, Jervey acquired considerable distinction. She was also a generous contributor to literature for children.

In 1872, she published Stories and Poems for children with her mother. The stories and poems were characterized as being not only clever and amusing, but there were also a multitude of them.

== Death ==
Jervey died in Charleston, January 29, 1877.

== Selected works ==
=== Novels ===
- Helen Courtenay's Promise, 1866
- Vernon Grove, 1859

=== Poetry collections ===
- Poems and Stories by a Mother and Daughter (with Caroline Howard Gilman), 1872
- Poetry and Prose for the Young, 1856
