= Edward C. Jones =

American architect (1822–1902)

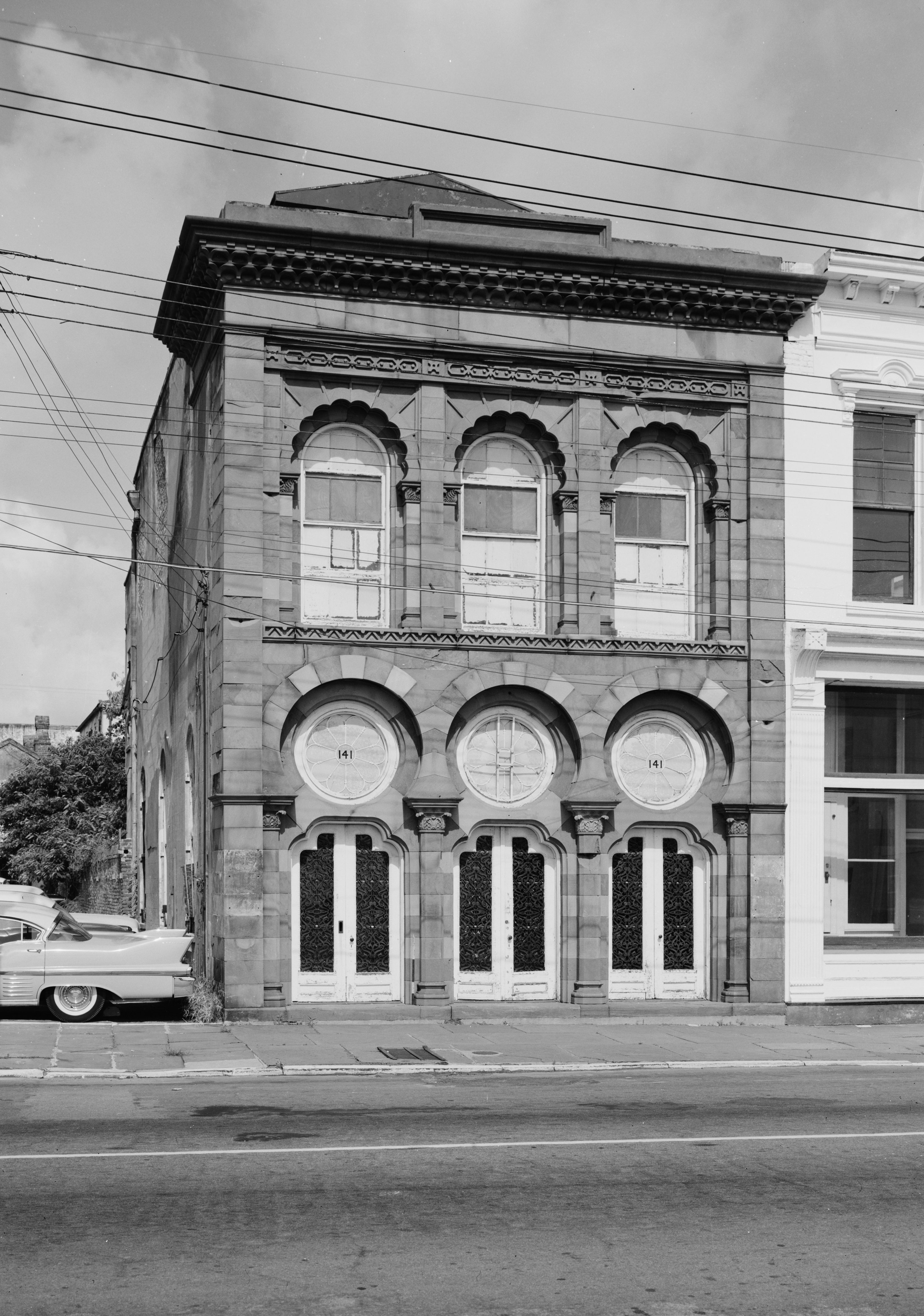
Farmers' and Exchange Bank

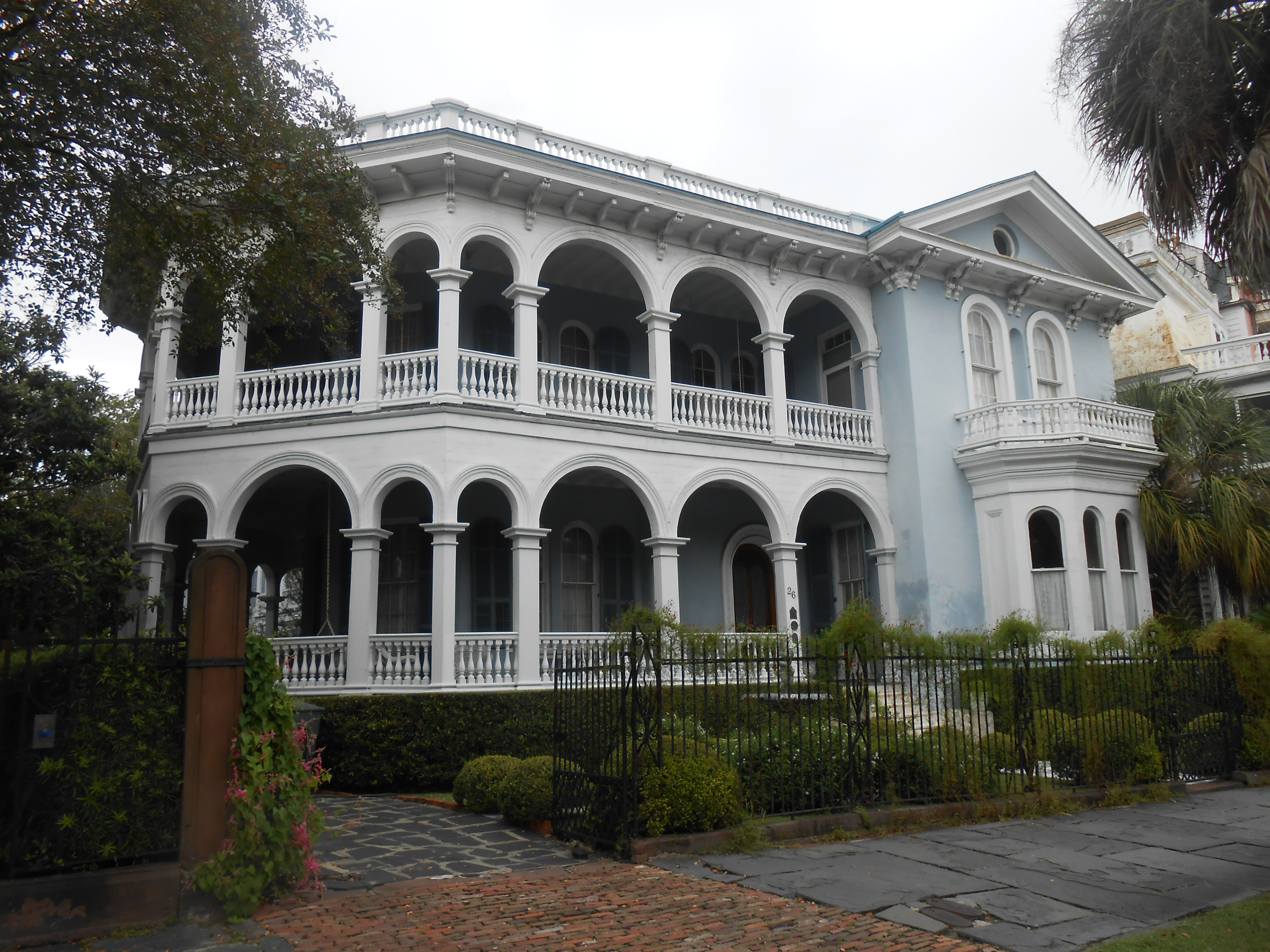
The John Ashe, Jr. House at 26 South Battery, Charleston, South Carolina

Edward Culliatt Jones (July 21, 1822 – February 12, 1902) was an American architect from Charleston, South Carolina. He designed banks, churches, jails, residences and public buildings including a courthouse and a school. A number of his works are listed on the U.S. National Register of Historic Places, and two are further designated as U.S. National Historic Landmarks.

== Work ==
- Farmers' and Exchange Bank (designed 1853, completed 1854), 141 East Bay St., Charleston, South Carolina, a National Historic Landmark
- Magnolia Cemetery (1850), 70 Cunnington Ave., Charleston, South Carolina
- Old Colleton County Jail, Jeffries Blvd., Walterboro, South Carolina
- Orangeburg County Jail, 44 Saint John St., Orangeburg, South Carolina (with Francis D. Lee)
- South Carolina National Bank of Charleston, 16 Broad St., Charleston, South Carolina
- St. Mark's Church, W of Pinewood on SR 51, Pinewood, South Carolina
- Walker Hall, SE of Spartanburg on SC 56, Spartanburg, South Carolina
- Furman University Richard Furman Hall, or "Old Main", Furman University campus, Greenville, South Carolina (no longer standing)
- Wofford College Historic District, Wofford College campus, Spartanburg, South Carolina
- Trinity Methodist Church (1848), 273 Meeting St., Charleston, South Carolina
- Vigilant Fire Engine House, State St., Charleston, South Carolina
- Moultrie House (1850), a hotel on Sullivan's Island, South Carolina (no longer standing)
- Camden Depot (1850), a train depot at 23 Ann St., Charleston, South Carolina
- Roper Hospital (1849), Queen St., Charleston, South Carolina (no longer standing)
- Col. John A.S. Ashe House (1853), 26 South Battery, Charleston, South Carolina
- New Work House (a colored prison), southwest corner of Magazine and Logan Sts. (no longer standing)
- Church of the Holy Cross (1850), Stateburg, South Carolina, National Historic Landmark
- Marlboro County Courthouse (1850), Bennettsville, South Carolina (rehabilitated 1981)
- Palmetto Fire Co. (1850), 27 Anson St., Charleston, South Carolina
- 252 King Street (1851), Charleston, South Carolina (no longer standing)
- Aiken House (1851), a hotel in Aiken, South Carolina (no longer standing)
- Shell Hall Hotel, Mt. Pleasant, South Carolina (no longer standing)
- Bank of Augusta (1852), Augusta, Georgia
- Zion Presbyterian Church, Calhoun St., Charleston, South Carolina (no longer standing)
- Flat Rock (Farmers') Hotel, Flat Rock, North Carolina
- St. John in the Wilderness Church, Flat Rock, North Carolina
- Calvary Church, Fletcher, North Carolina
- Normal School of Charleston, Charleston, South Carolina (no longer standing)
- Friend Street Public School (1859), Legare and Broad Sts., Charleston, South Carolina (destroyed by fire, 1861)
- German Fire Company Engine House (1851), 8 Chalmers St., Charleston, South Carolina (rehabilitated, 1981)
