= South Carolina School for the Deaf and the Blind =

Public school in South Carolina, US

South Carolina School for the Deaf and Blind

Location
- 355 Cedar Springs Road; Spartanburg, South Carolina address 29302; United States; 34°54′39″N 81°52′56″W

Information
- Type: Public
- Established: 1849 (177 years ago)
- President: Jolene Madison
- Grades: Pre-K–12
- Colors: Green and white
- Mascot: Hornet
- Website: www.scsdb.org

The South Carolina School for the Deaf and the Blind is a school in unincorporated Spartanburg County, South Carolina, United States, near Spartanburg and with a Spartanburg postal address. It was founded in 1849 by the Reverend Newton Pinckney Walker as a private school for students who were deaf. The School for the Blind was established in 1855, and the school became state funded in 1856.

Previously students were under de jure educational segregation in the United States with black students separate. In 1967 the school racially integrated.

The School for the Multihandicapped was established in 1977, and the school began providing outreach services in the mid-1980s.

== Walker Hall ==
- Walker Hall
- U.S. National Register of Historic Places
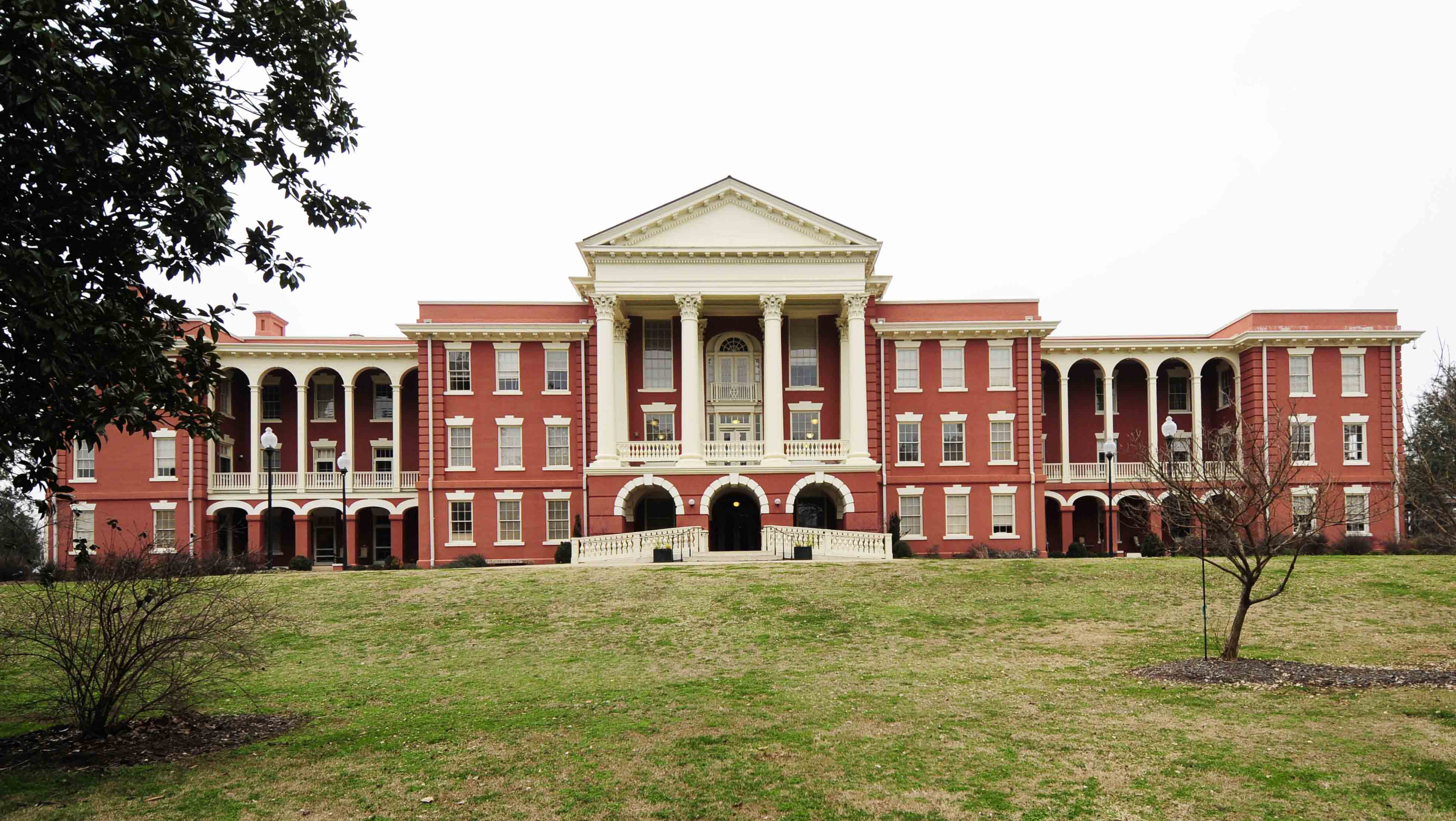
- Walker Hall, February 2012
- Location: Southeast of Spartanburg on South Carolina Highway 56, near Spartanburg, South Carolina
- Area: 3 acres (1.2 ha)
- Built: 1857–1859, 1885, 1921
- Architect: Jones, Edward C.; Samuel Sloan
- Architectural style: Greek Revival, Italian Villa
- NRHP reference No.: 77001232
- Added to NRHP: December 6, 1977

Walker Hall was designed by Charleston architect Edward C. Jones. Built around 1857–1859, it is a brick building with Greek Revival and Italian Villa design elements. A west wing, designed by Philadelphia architect Samuel Sloan was added in 1885. The front façade features a pedimented portico supported by Corinthian order columns. A rear annex was built in 1921.

Walker Hall was listed on the National Register of Historic Places in 1977.

== Campus ==
The school has dormitories available. They are for students living outside of the Spartanburg area counties.

== Transportation ==
Boarding students are transported between campus and their houses on weekends while day students in the Spartanburg area are transported every day.
