= Fay House =

Coordinates: 42°22′34.33″N 71°7′20.36″W

Fay House is a Federal style mansion in Cambridge, Massachusetts that currently serves as the main administrative building of the Radcliffe Institute for Advanced Study at Harvard University.

== History ==
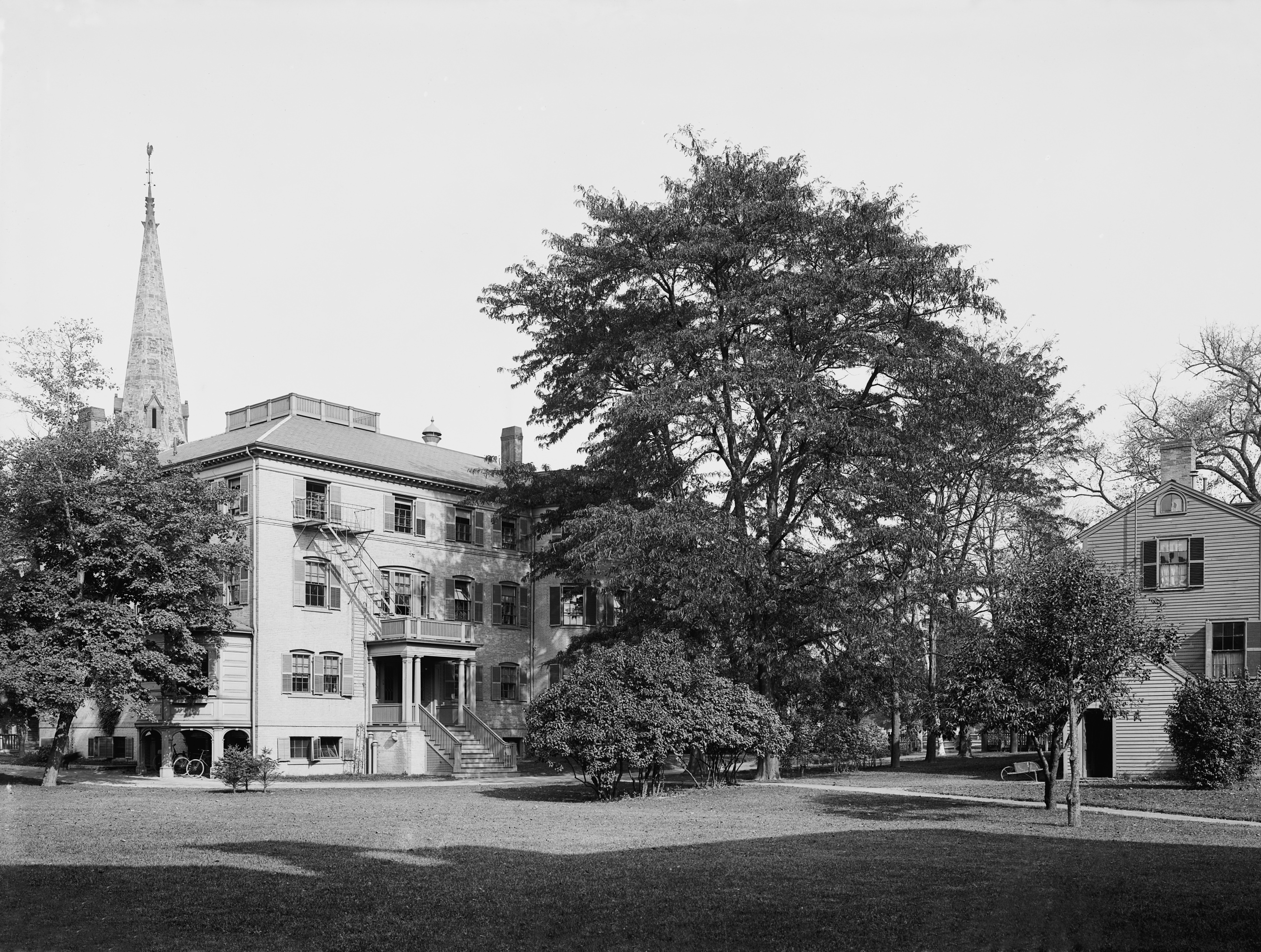
Fay House (left), c.1904.

Fay House was built in 1807 by Nathaniel Ireland. It faces Cambridge Common across Garden Street. Ireland lived in the house with his wife Sally, but was forced to mortgage the property in 1809.

The house was sold at auction to Dr. Joseph McKean, a Harvard graduate, in 1814. After McKean's early death in 1818, the house and property changed hands several times. In October 1831, the house was purchased by Stephen Higginson, bursar of Harvard College. In 1870, a mansard roof was added to the structure.

Fay House was the first building owned by Radcliffe College. In 1890, the mansard roof was removed, and a third story was constructed to house the college library. Another addition was made to the south side of the building. In 1892, another addition on the west side of the building was built to create an auditorium and classrooms.

Fay House was renovated by the Radcliffe Institute in 2013.

== Sources ==
Baker, Christina Hopkinson. The Story of Fay House. Cambridge, Harvard University Press, 1929. Cambridge Historical Commission. Survey of architectural history in Cambridge. Cambridge, Distributed by the M.I.T. Press, 1965–1977.
