= Farmers' and Exchange Bank =

- U.S. National Register of Historic Places
- U.S. National Historic Landmark
- U.S. National Historic Landmark District – Contributing property
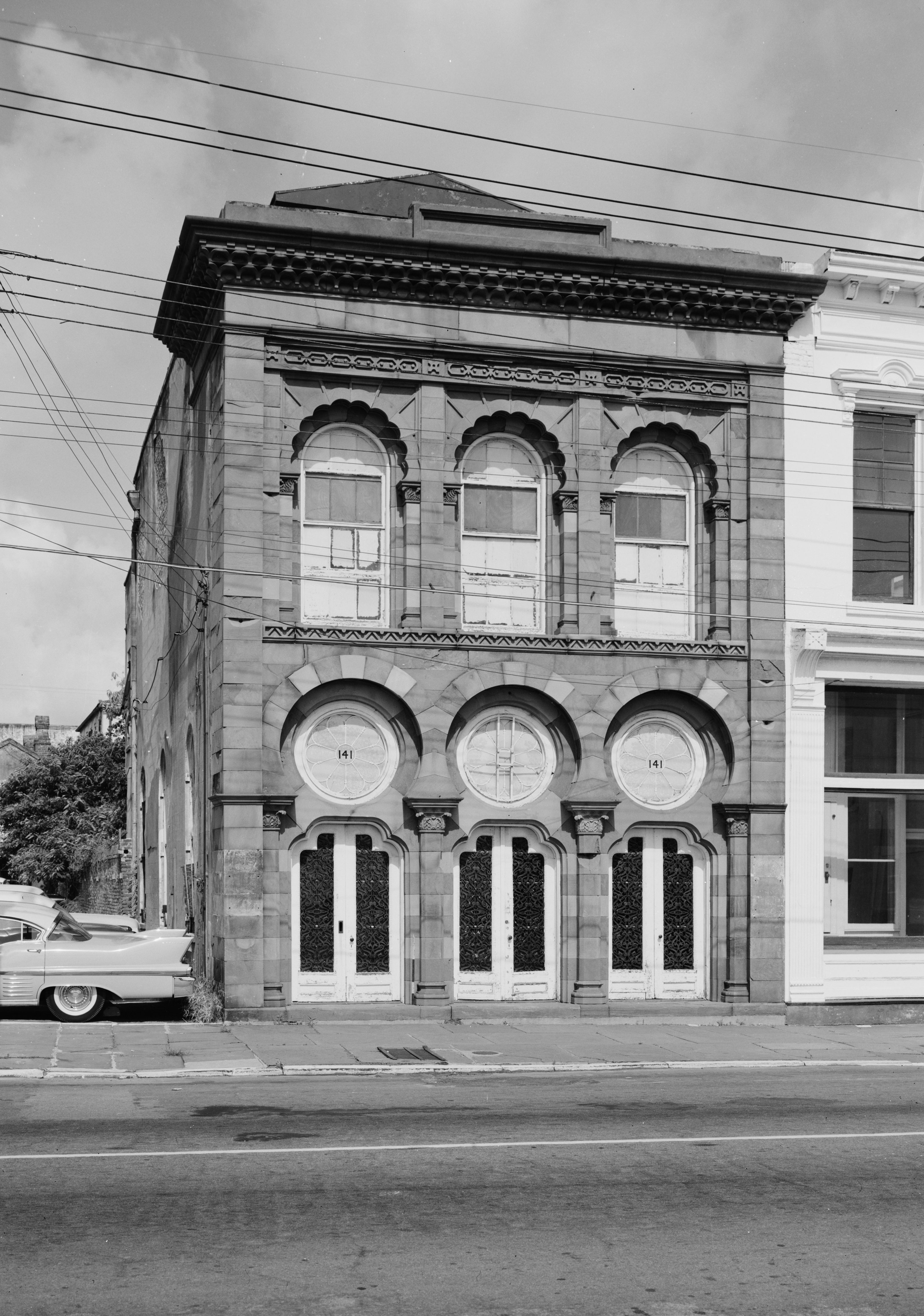
- Farmers' and Exchange Bank

- Location within South Carolina Location within the United States
- Location: 141 E. Bay St., Charleston, South Carolina
- Coordinates: 32°46′39.5″N 79°55′38″W
- Built: 1853–54
- Architect: Edward C. Jones; Francis D. Lee
- Architectural style: Moorish Revival, Exotic Revival
- Part of: Charleston Historic District (ID66000964)
- NRHP reference No.: 73001685

Significant dates
- Added to NRHP: November 7, 1973
- Designated NHL: November 7, 1973
- Designated NHLDCP: October 9, 1960

The Farmers' and Exchange Bank is a historic commercial building in Charleston, South Carolina. Built in 1853–54, it is an architecturally distinctive building, with Moorish Revival features rarely seen in the United States. The building is recognizable for its use of muqarnas—characteristic of Persian and North African architecture—as well as its large arched windows and striking red sandstone facade. It was declared a National Historic Landmark in 1973.

== Description and history ==
The Farmers' and Exchange Bank is located on the west side of East Bay Street in the Charleston Historic District. It is a two-story masonry structure, built out of brick and multiple shades of brownstone, with stucco finish. Its main facade is three bays wide, each bay taken up by a tall arched opening with Moorish features. The first floor openings have a contoured shape, with circular windows above entries with intricately carved doors. The second-floor openings are similar, with the upper circular portion having a scalloped edge, and the arches filled with large multi-pane fixed windows.

The building was designed by Edward C. Jones and Francis D. Lee, both Charleston architects, and was completed in 1854. Its design is probably based on depictions of Moorish architecture published in Washington Irving's The Alhambra, which was published around that time. It was for some time thought to have been influenced by the Regency architecture of Great Britain, specifically the "Hindu" influence of buildings of that period such as the Royal Pavilion in Brighton, but the architects have been judged unlikely to have been exposed to such influences.

The structure was considered for demolition in the early 1970s but Charleston banker Hugh Lane Sr. contributed $50,000 toward its restoration.

== See also ==
- List of National Historic Landmarks in South Carolina
- National Register of Historic Places listings in Charleston, South Carolina
