= Antonio Lorenzoni =

Italian lawyer, jurist and music theorist (1755–1840)

Antonio Lorenzoni (Montecchio Maggiore 10 June 1755 – 30 September 1840) was an Italian lawyer, jurist and music theorist.

== Biography ==
Antonio Lorenzoni was born to Pasino Lorenzoni and Elisabetta Sartorio in the family's country house in Montecchio Maggiore near Vicenza.

In his youth, he received a musical education, but the Saggio per ben sonare il Flautotraverso (1779) remains the only evidence of this juvenile passion, which presumably ended with the beginning of his profession as a lawyer.

Having completed the high school education in Vicenza, he enrolled in the Faculty of Law at the University of Padua, where he obtained a degree in public and private law in 1778. He then began working as a freelance lawyer at the Vicenza Bar until he was promoted in 1813 by the government of the Kingdom of Italy to Avvocato del Fisco, a position he held for thirteen years.

In 1814 he had a new villa built by Bartolomeo Malacarne in place of the house where he was born in Montecchio.

Late in life he acquired a reputation as an influential jurist, so much so that he was esteemed even beyond the borders of Italy. On his death, a municipal decree had his body moved to the Vicenza cemetery, near the tombs of the most illustrious citizens.

In 1876 the Municipality of Montecchio Maggiore erected a bust of him in the council chamber of the town hall.

== Works ==
- Saggio per ben sonare il Flautotraverso con alcune notizie generali ed utili per qualunque strumento, ed altre concernenti la storia della musica, Vicenza, 1779.
- Istituzioni del diritto civile privato per la Provincia Vicentina, Vicenza, 1785–86.
- Stampa in causa dell’eredità Almerico contenente: Risposta della pia Congregazione di Vicenza etc. non che delli signori Tranquillo Toaldo, Francesco dott. Rubini etc. al confronto del sig. Licinio Muzan del fu Carlo, 1817.
- Istituzioni del diritto pubblico interno pel Regno Lombardo-Veneto, Padova, 1835–39.
- Scelta di disposizioni del diritto romano, Padova, 1838.
- Saggio di logica, ossia principii fondamentali per far retto uso delle forze dell’intelletto onde discernere il vero dal falso, Padova, 1839.
- Regole ed avvertenze che in ordine al venerato dispaccio 9 Settembre 1817 dell’Aulica Camera di organizzazione in Vienna osservare si devono dal R. Fisco per l’esame delle Fidejussioni.
