= Fair Harvard =

Alma mater of Harvard University

"Fair Harvard" is the alma mater of Harvard University. Written by the Reverend Samuel Gilman of the class of 1811 for the university's 200th anniversary in 1836, it bids the school an affectionate farewell. Of its four verses, the first and fourth are traditionally sung and the second and third omitted.

The song is set to a traditional Irish air, best known in early 19th century America as "Believe Me, if All Those Endearing Young Charms", a popular song whose lyrics were written by the Irish poet Thomas Moore. The tune is occasionally wrongly credited to Sir William Davenant, whose library may have been a source of the music for later publishers. (The tune is also a newer setting of "My Lodging Is In The Cold, Cold Ground".) Horatio Alger Jr., an 1852 graduate of Harvard's Divinity School, composed his "Harvard Odes" I-IV, and Paul Laurence Dunbar originally wrote the lyrics of the "Tuskegee Song", to the tune.

The song is referenced in The Simpsons episode “The Front”.

== Original version ==
Fair Harvard! Thy sons to thy Jubilee throng,
And with blessings surrender thee o'er
By these festival rites, from the age that is past,
To the age that is waiting before.
O relic and type of our ancestors' worth
That hast long kept their memory warm,
First flow'r of their wilderness! Star of their night!
Calm rising thro' change and thro' storm.

To thy bow'rs we were led in the bloom of our youth,
From the home of our infantile years,
When our fathers had warn'd, and our mothers had pray'd,
And our sisters had blest thro' their tears.
Thou then wert our parent, the nurse of our soul;
We were molded to manhood by thee,
Till freighted with treasure thoughts, friendships and hopes,
Thou didst launch us on Destiny's sea.

When as pilgrims we come to revisit thy halls,
To what kindlings the season gives birth!
Thy shades are more soothing, thy sunlight more dear,
Than descend on less privileged earth.
For the good and the great, in their beautiful prime,
Thro' thy precincts have musingly trod,
As they girded their spirits or deepen'd the streams
That make glad the fair city of God.

Farewell! be thy destinies onward and bright!
To thy children the lesson still give,
With freedom to think, and with patience to bear,
And for right ever bravely to live.
Let not moss-covered error moor thee at its side,
As the world on truth's current glides by
Be the herald of light, and the bearer of love,
Till the stock of the Puritans die.

== 1998 revision ==
The term "sons" was eliminated to make the song gender neutral. The first line was revised to read "...we join in thy jubilee throng" between 1997 and 1998. As a side effect of the change, the word throng, a verb in the original lyrics, became a noun.

== 2017 revision ==
In 2017 Harvard announced it was running a contest to replace the last line of the song "Till the stock of the Puritans die". In early October 2017 semifinalist potential replacement lines were announced. The final replacement line was chosen as "Till the stars in the firmament die."
