= Samuel Gilman =

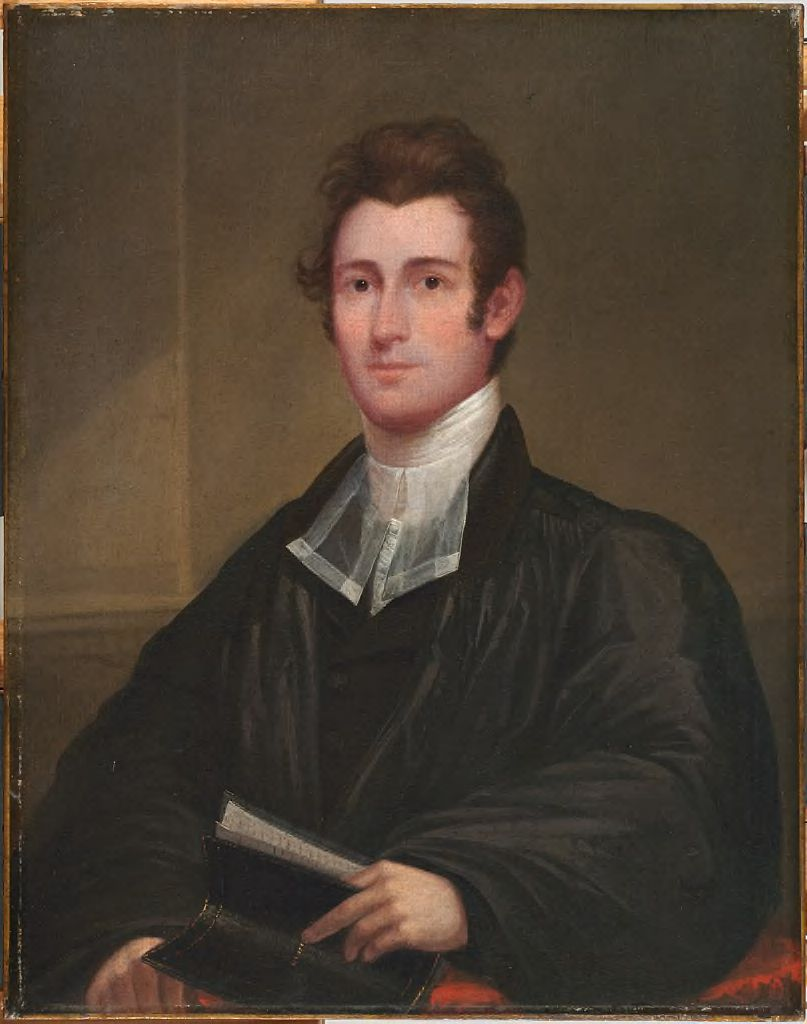
Rev. Samuel Gilman

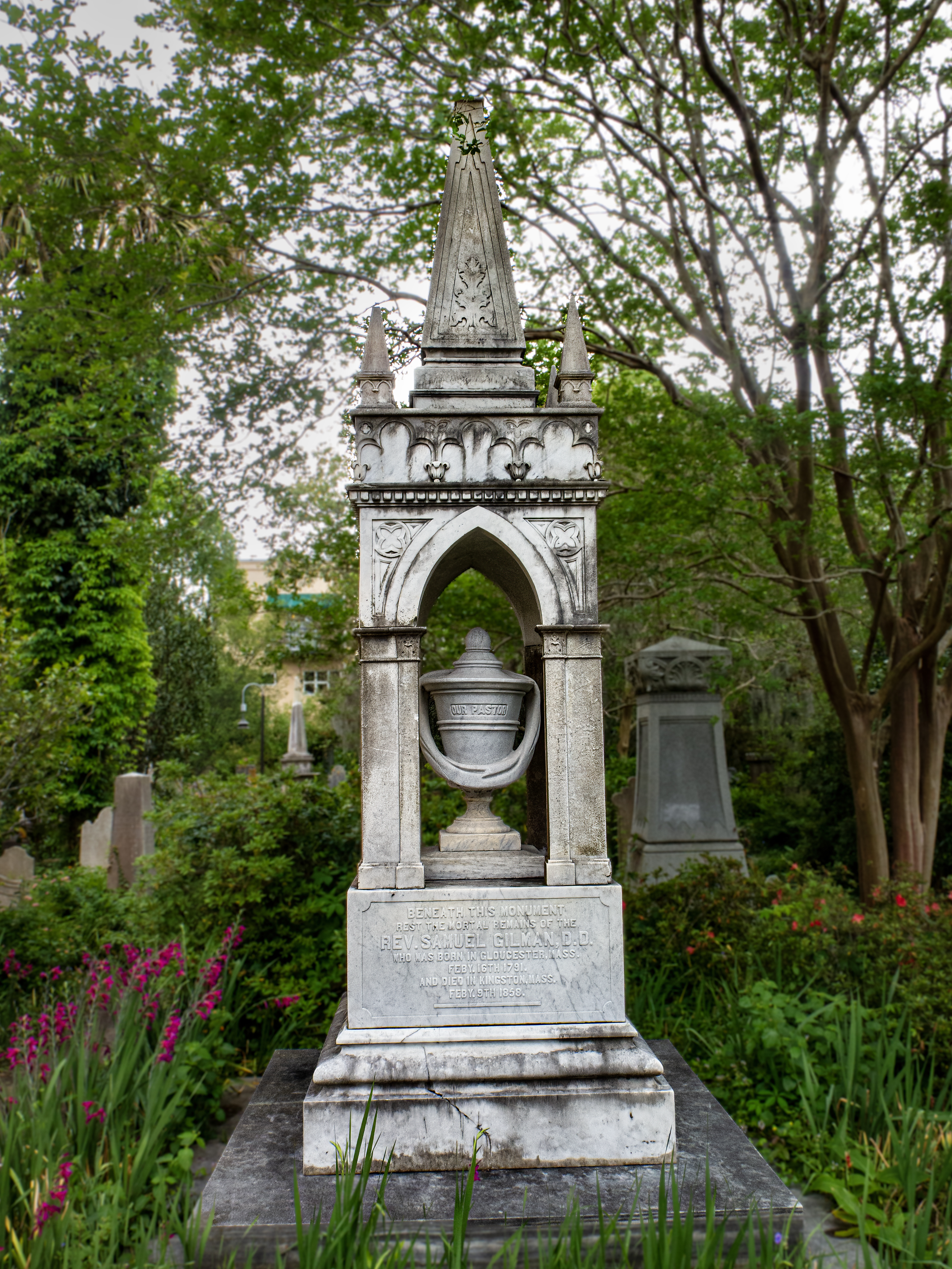
Gravesite of Rev. Samuel Gilman at the Unitarian Universalist Church in Charleston, SC. April 2017

The Reverend Samuel Gilman (1791–1858) was an American clergyman and author.

== Early life and education ==
Gilman was born in Gloucester, Massachusetts on February 16, 1791, the son of a wealthy merchant who had a sudden reversal of fortune. He began his studies at Harvard University and graduated in the same class as Edward Everett and others.

== Career ==
In 1819 was ordained pastor of the Unitarian church at Charleston, South Carolina which he continued to serve till his death on February 9, 1858, in Kingston, Massachusetts.

He was an active advocate of the temperance cause. His writings consisted of Fair Harvard (1836), a hymn; contributions to periodicals; translations of certain of Boileau's satires; and other works, including:

- Memoirs of a New England Village Choir (1829)
- Pleasures and Pains of a Student's Life (1852)
- Contributions to Literature, Descriptive, Critical, Humorous, Biographical, Philosophical, and Poetical (1856)

== Personal life and death ==
Caroline Howard Gilman, his wife, published several popular books.
