= Louis Drouet =

French flautist and composer

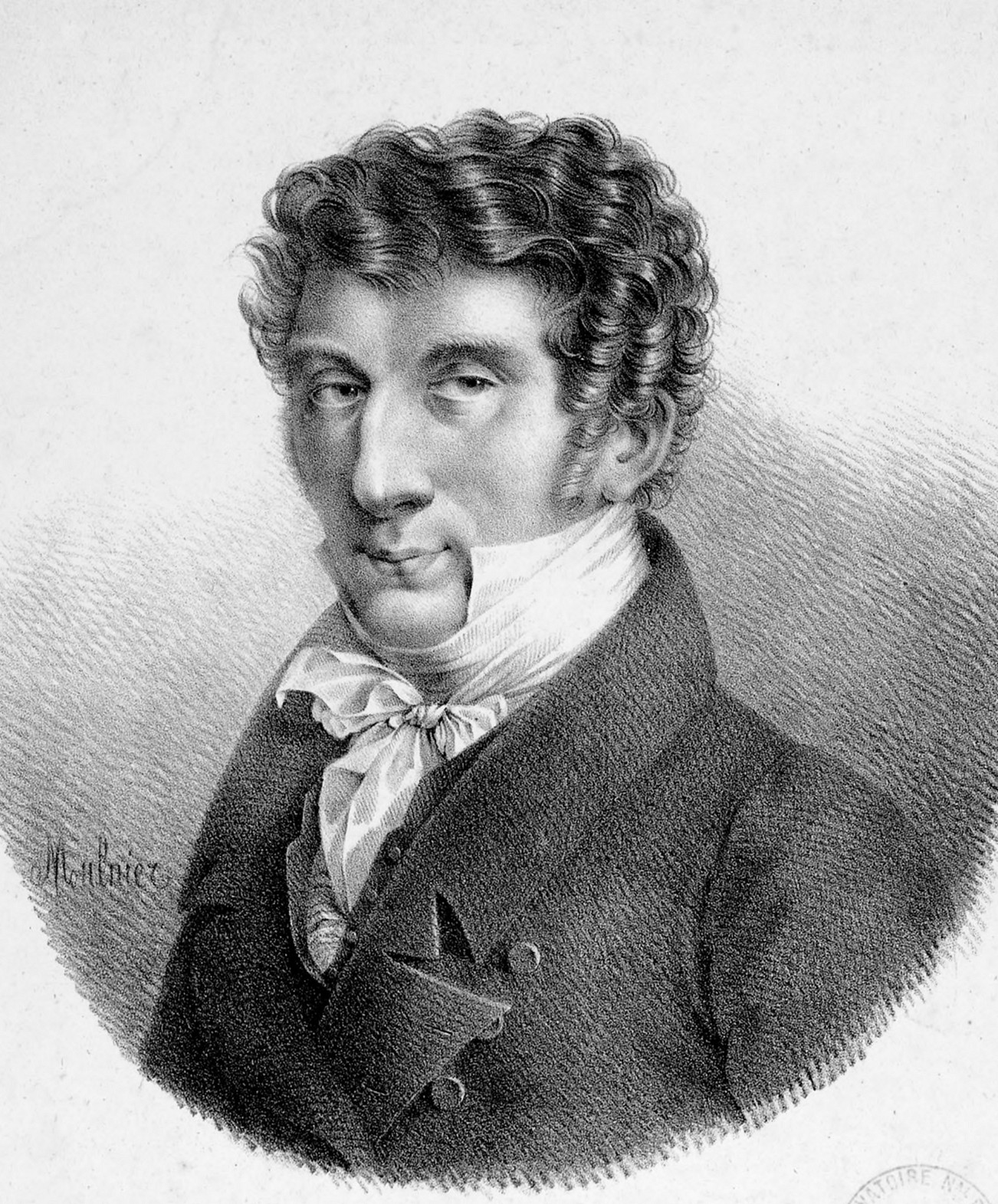
- Louis Drouet
- Born: Louis-François-Philippe Drouet; 14 April 1792; Amsterdam
- Died: 30 September 1873 (aged 81); Bern
- Occupations: Flautist; Composer

Louis-François-Philippe Drouet (14 April 1792 – 30 September 1873) was a 19th-century French flutist and composer.

== Biography ==
Born of a French father expatriated in the Netherlands and barber by profession, Louis Drouet began learning to play the flute as a self-taught man before entering the Conservatoire de Paris at the age of seven.

At 16, he was first flutist and teacher of Louis Bonaparte, Napoléon's brother, and King of Holland. In 1816 he appeared on a Philharmonic Society concert in London, on a performance of his own flute concertante, apparently after having started a factory for making flutes in 1815. After touring trips to England, the United States and Europe, in 1840 he became director of music by the Duke of Saxe-Cobourg-Gotha.

Drouet was a great friend of Felix Mendelssohn. William Gordon, co-inventor of the Boehm system, and Wilhelm Popp were among his pupils. He was often referred to as the "Paganini of flute".

== Works ==
The musicologist Arthur Pougin wanted to attribute to Louis Drouet (apparently wrongly) the melody of the unofficial hymn of the Second French Empire, "Partant pour la Syrie", although considered as having been composed by Hortense de Beauharnais, Queen of Holland from 1806 to 1810, and Napoléon III's mother.

Compositions

- 10 concertos
- more than 20 duets, trios, solos and fantasies
- more than 300 studies

Pedagogic method

- Méthode pour la flûte, ou Traité complet et raisonné pour apprendre à jouer de cet instrument, Paris : A. J. Pleyel et fils aîné, 1828, Mayence & Anvers : B. Schott, 1829 translation into English under the title Drouët's Method of Flute Playing, London: R. Cocks, 1830 reissued in French by Arlette Biget and Michel Giboureau in Flûte traversière : méthodes, traités, périodiques, vol. III, Courlay : J. M. Fuzeau, 2005.

== Bibliography ==
- Moritz Fürstenau (1877). "Drouet, Louis François Philippe" . Allgemeine Deutsche Biographie (in German). Vol. 5. Leipzig: Duncker & Humblot. p. 434.
- András Adorján, Lenz Meierott (Hrsg.): Lexikon der Flöte, Laaber-Verl., Laaber 2009, ISBN 978-3-89007-545-7
