= Francis D. Lee =

American architect

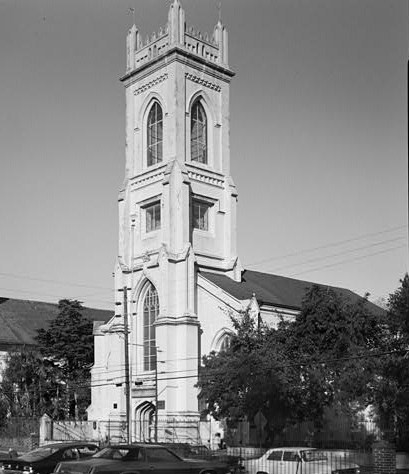
Unitarian Church

Francis D. Lee (1826–1885) was an American architect and inventor from Charleston, South Carolina.

== Life ==
He graduated from the College of Charleston in 1846 and completed his master's degree in 1848. He worked closely with the community of Charleston, through his work as a member of the South Carolina Society, the Scots Rites Masonic Lodge and as a member of the Unitarian Church. In 1852 he was hired as the architect to design the enlarged and remodeled Unitarian Church in Charleston, which took him 2 years to complete. He worked as an architect until the outbreak of the American Civil War, where he became a Confederate Army Captain under the staffing of General Beauregard, who took full advantage of his inventiveness, by encouraging him to design and construct (with assistance) a small Torpedo Boat, named The Torch. This boat was a spar boat, named so due to explosive devices placed at the end of a long pole or spar, in The Torch's case, it had 3 such spar's mounted to the bow to attack blockading warships.

After the war, he returned to Charleston to set up a partnership with Edward C. Jones which became the firm Jones & Lee, under this guise he went on to design many nationally recognised buildings and monuments (largely during the 1850s). In 1868 he moved to St. Louis and teamed up with Thomas B. Annan, a local architect, they quickly built a reputation for themselves after winning a design competition for St. Louis Merchant's Exchange Building (it cost £2 million to build and was completed in 1875). Lee and Annan parted company in 1876.

In 1884, Lee along with several other local architects founded the first incarnation of the St. Louis Chapter of the American Institute of Architects.

== Selected works ==
Name of Building	Location	Date Built	Further Details
Citadel Square Baptist Church	328 Meeting St., Charleston, South Carolina	1855	
Farmers' and Exchange Bank	141 E. Bay St., Charleston, South Carolina	1854	Declared NHL in 1973
Kensington Plantation House	4101 McCords Ferry Road, Eastover, South Carolina	1851-1853	Added to the NRHP in 1971
Old Colleton County Jail	Jeffries Blvd., Walterboro, South Carolina	1856	Added to the NRHP in 1971
Orangeburg County Jail	44 Saint John St., Orangeburg, South Carolina	1857-1860	Added to the NRHP in 1973
St. Luke's Episcopal Church	24 Elizabeth St., Charleston, South Carolina	1862	
St. Mark's Church	W of Pinewood on SR 51, Pinewood, South Carolina	1855	Added to the NRHP in 1978
Unitarian Church	6 Archdale St., Charleston, South Carolina	1852	Declared NHL in 1973
