= John Fullerton House =

Historic building in South Carolina

Coordinates: 32.772600°N 79.934067°W

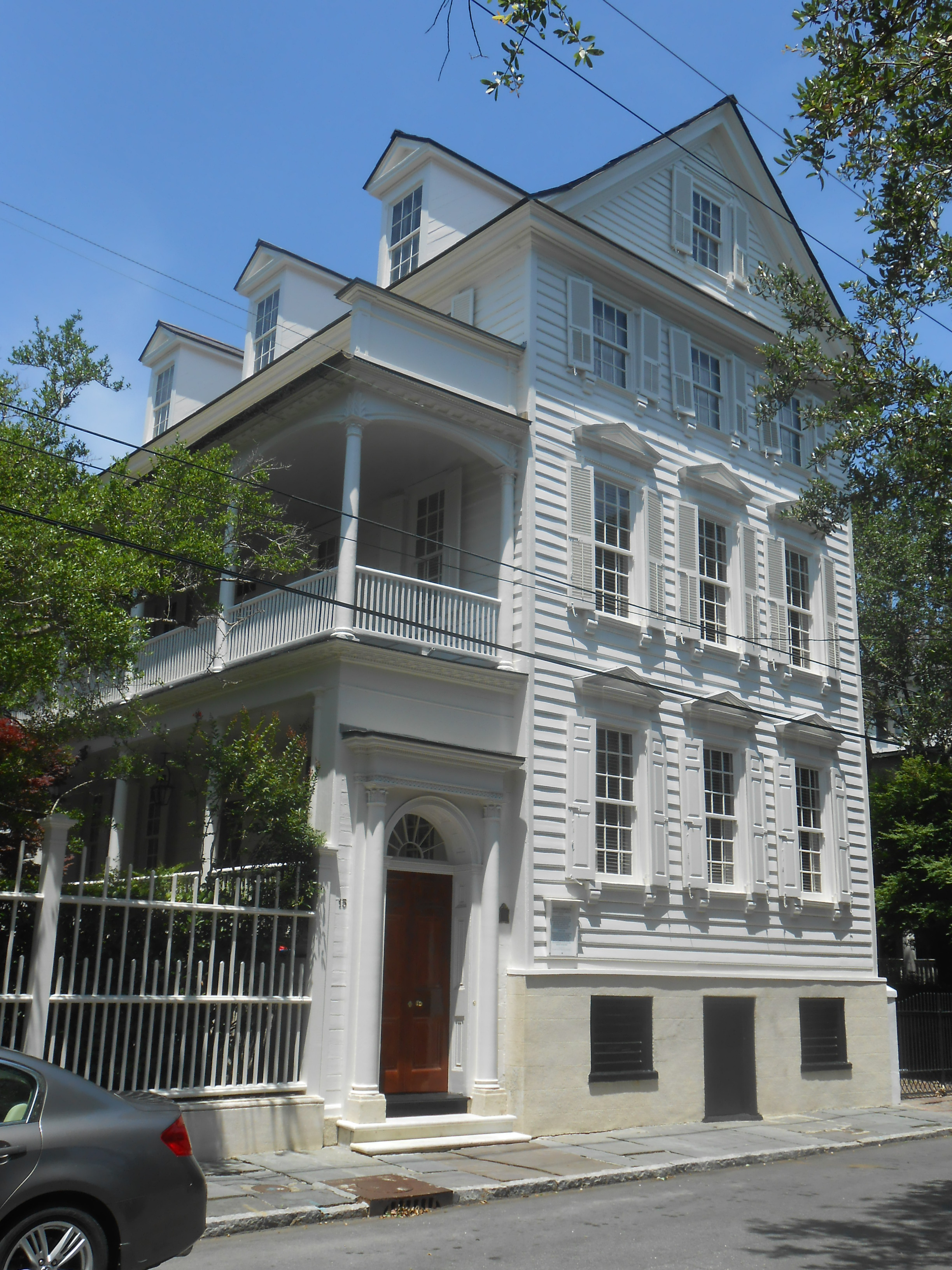
The John Fullerton House is at 15 Legare Street, Charleston, South Carolina.

The John Fullerton House is a historic building on Legare Street in Charleston, South Carolina. The house was designed and built by Scottish master builder John Fullerton some time after he bought the land on December 31, 1772, and before he resold it at a much higher cost in 1777. Among the notable features of the house are the highly decorative window casings on the first and second floor; the console brackets and hoods reflect a high style that can be found on other notable houses of the same period in Charleston. The house is built of cypress.

== History ==
During the American Revolutionary War, some accounts state that British soldiers were quartered in the house. General Charles Cornwallis was definitely housed at the Miles Brewton House on King Street, and that property at the time continued without interruption to Legare Street. Another more fanciful example of traditional Charleston lore tells of two neighbors who held a duel from the upper floors of their two houses including 15 Legare Street.

| Preceded by Simmons-Edwards House | Most Expensive House in Charleston, South Carolina; December 1987-December 1988 | Succeeded by Caspar Christian Schutt House |
