= Ukraine deal =

Ukraine deals or Ukraine's deal refers to actual or once prospective deals centered on Ukraine. In past decade it may refer to:

- March 2014's European Union–Ukraine Association Agreement
- September 2014's Minsk agreements
- 2014-present Peace negotiations in the Russian invasion of Ukraine
- 2022-2023's Black Sea Grain Initiative
- 2025's Ukraine–United States Mineral Resources Agreement
