= Caspar Christian Schutt House =

19th-century house in South Carolina, US

Coordinates: 32.773924°N 79.927488°W

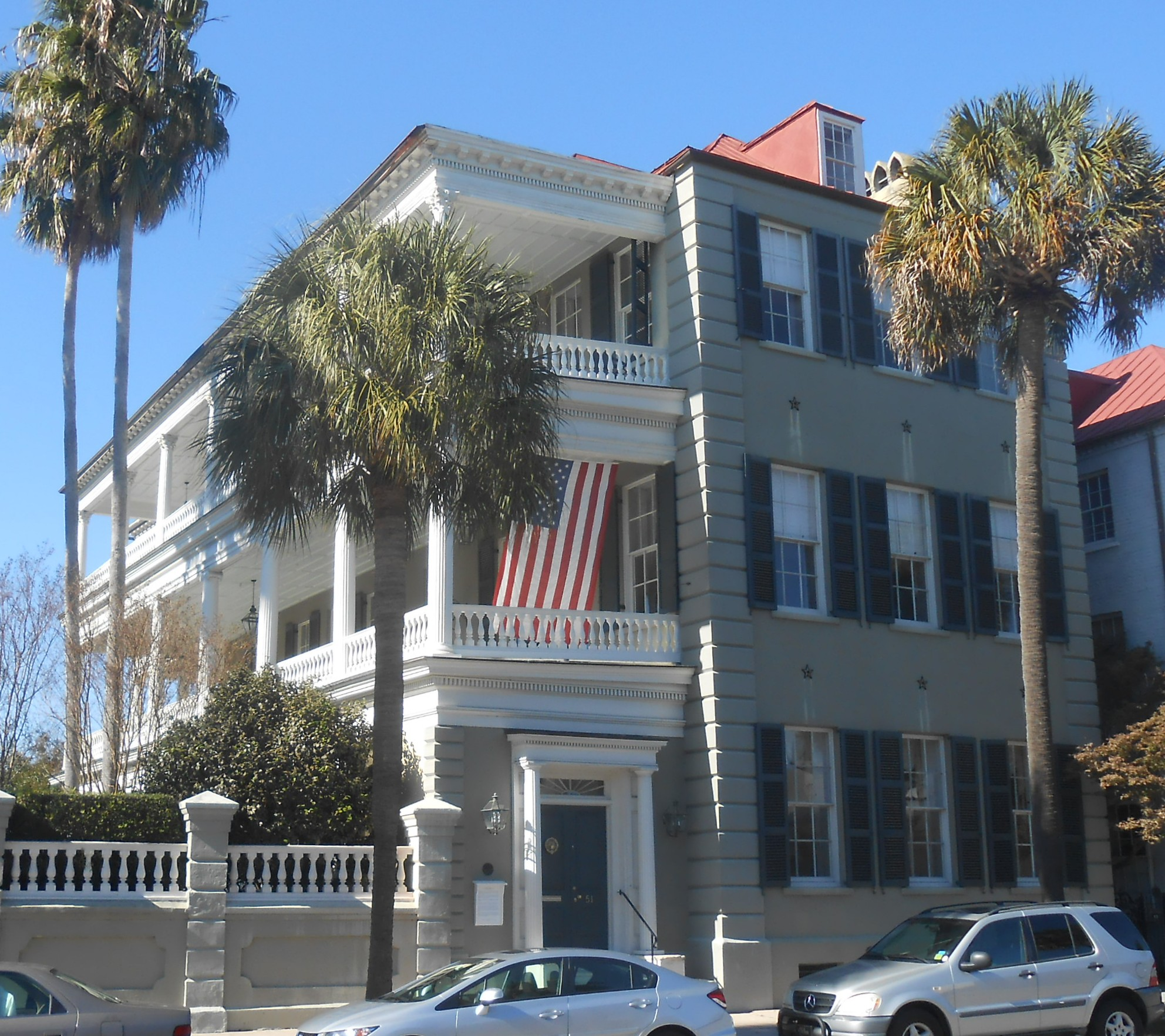
The Christian Schutt House at 51 East Bay Street, Charleston, South Carolina

The Caspar Christian Schutt House is an early 19th-century house at 51 East Bay Street, Charleston, South Carolina.

The house is one of the largest examples of a Charleston single house ever built in Charleston. A wealthy German merchant named Caspar Christian Schutt had the house erected soon after buying the lot in 1799. The interior features large rooms with unusually high ceilings.

Mr. Schutt bought the lot from Benjamin Dart Roper on September 14, 1799. Mr. Schutt was residing at his new house by 1802, but he died in 1803; his widow remained.

In November 1939, owner Edwin Parsons died in a third-floor bedroom when his bed caught fire. In 1941, widow Mrs. Edwin Parsons sold the house to Albert G. Simms and his wife, Ruth Hanna McCormick--both of whom had served in Congress.

The house has twice held the record for the highest price for a Charleston house. It sold for $1.25 million in December 1988 and held the distinction until the Simmons-Edwards House sold for $2 million six months later. Then, the house sold in October 2025 for $21,028,560. It was the first house to sell for more than $20 million in Charleston.

Preceded by John Fullerton House	Most Expensive House in Charleston, South Carolina; December 1988-May 1989	Succeeded by Simmons-Edwards House

Preceded by John Ravenel House	Most Expensive House in Charleston, South Carolina; October 2025-	Succeeded by Current
