= John Ravenel House =

19th century house in South Carolina, US

Coordinates: 32.770514190173174°N 79.92871657582694°W

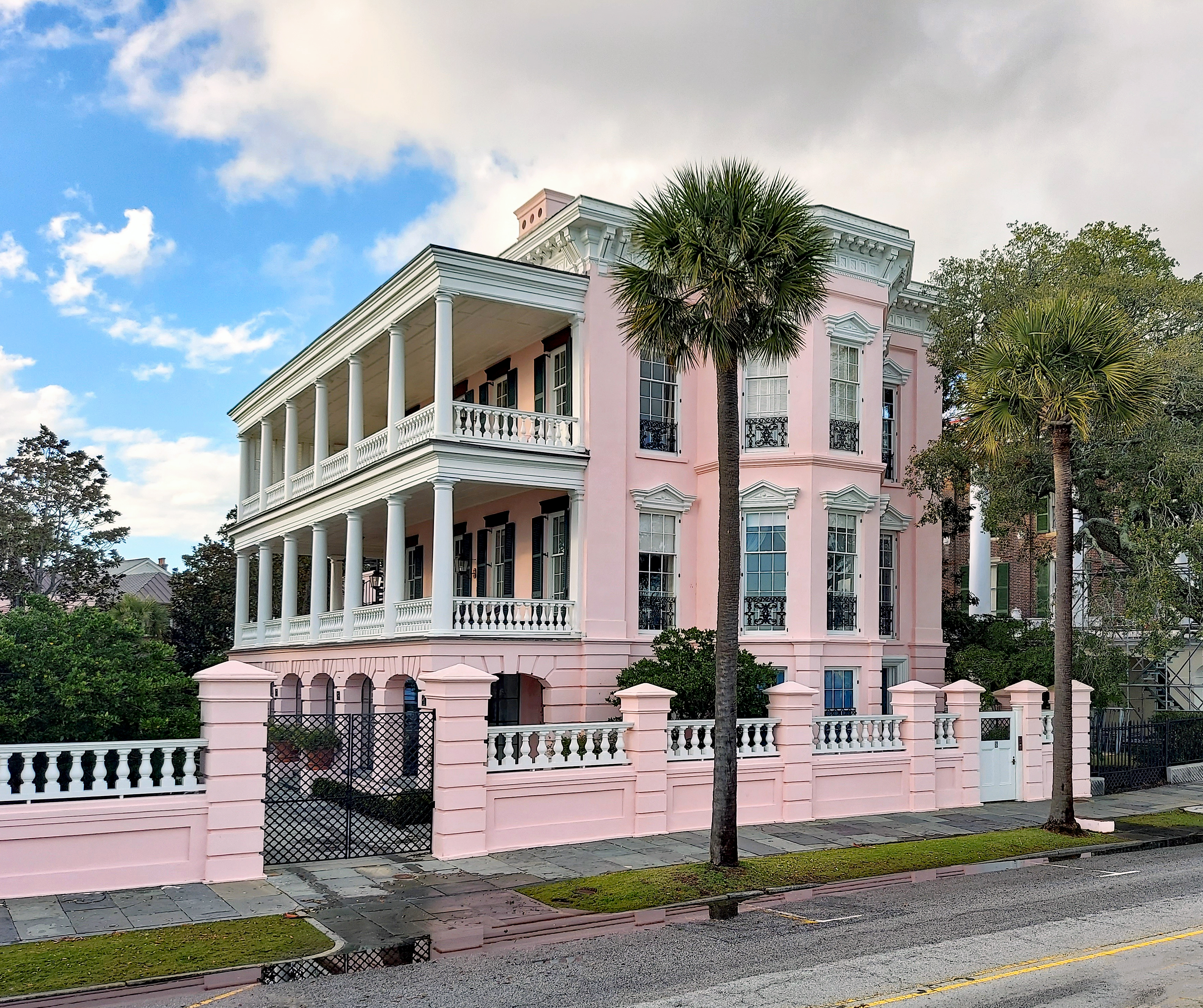
The John Ravenel House at 5 East Battery, Charleston, South Carolina, in 2022.

The John Ravenel House is a 9,407-square-foot house at 5 East Battery, Charleston, South Carolina, near the tip of the Charleston peninsula. It has 8 bedrooms and 10 bathrooms.

== History ==
The house was built on reclaimed marshland. The area was divided into lots that the City of Charleston auctioned off in April 1838. The lot was resold in 1847 to John Ravenel, who then built the house and transferred it to his son, St. Julien Ravenel. The house was rebuilt after the 1886 Charleston earthquake.

In 2016, future United States Secretary of the Treasury Scott Bessent purchased the house for $6.5 million. His renovation received an award from the Preservation Society of Charleston in 2021. He sold the property in March 2025 for $18.25 million plus $3 million for the furnishings and fixtures; it was the highest price ever for a house in Charleston.

It remains privately owned.

Preceded by 10 Legare Street	Most Expensive House in Charleston, South Carolina; March 2025 - October 2025	Succeeded by Caspar Christian Schutt House
