= Scott Bessent =

American businessman and government official (born 1962)

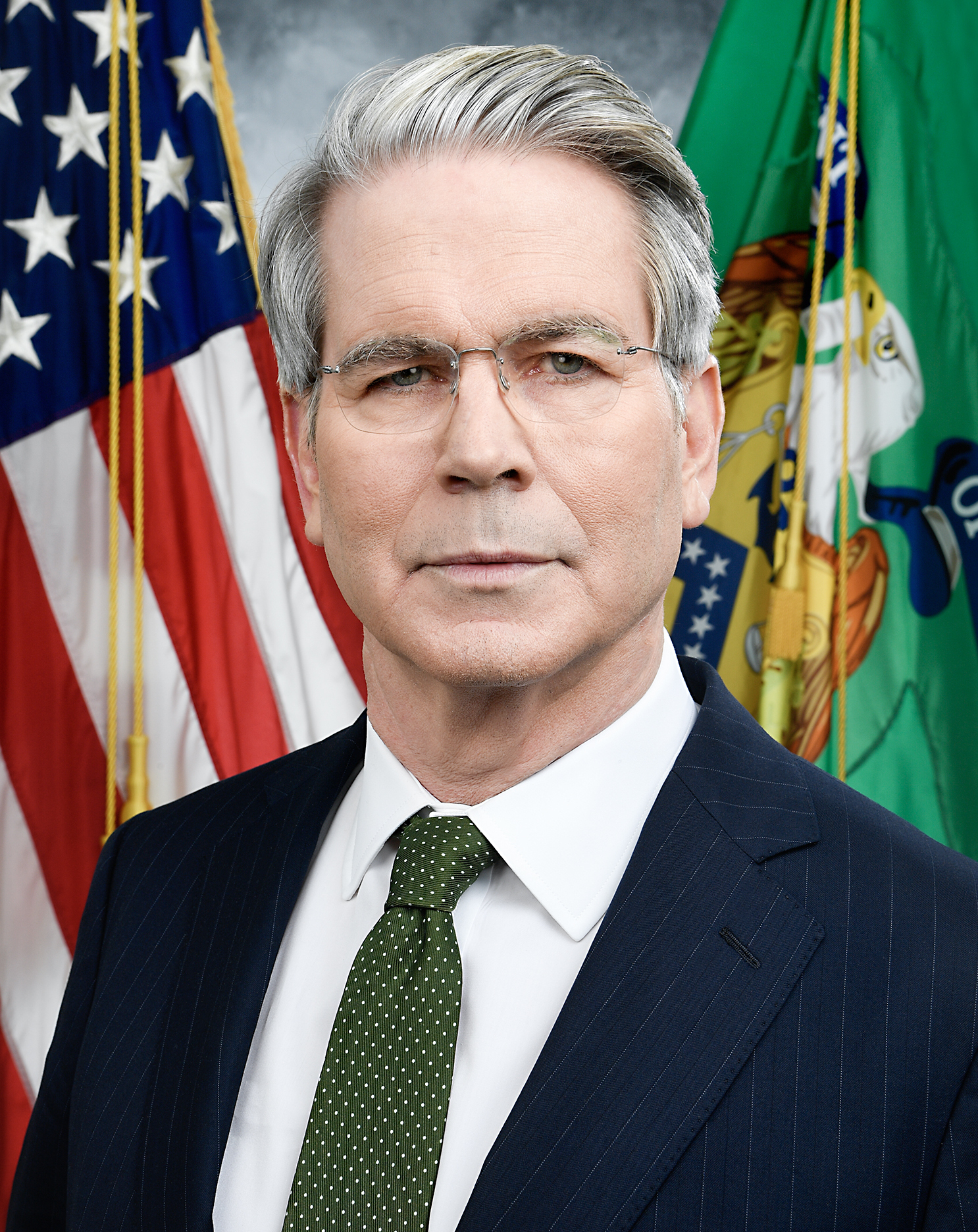
- Official portrait, 2025

79th United States Secretary of the Treasury
- Incumbent
- Assumed office January 28, 2025
- President: Donald Trump
- Deputy: Michael Faulkender; Francis Brooke
- Preceded by: Janet Yellen

Acting Commissioner of Internal Revenue
- In office August 8, 2025 – March 6, 2026
- President: Donald Trump
- Preceded by: Billy Long
- Succeeded by: Vacant

Acting Director of the Consumer Financial Protection Bureau
- In office February 3, 2025 – February 7, 2025
- President: Donald Trump
- Deputy: Zixta Martinez
- Preceded by: Zixta Martinez (acting)
- Succeeded by: Russell Vought (acting)

Personal details
- Born: Scott Kenneth Homer Bessent; August 21, 1962 (age 64) Conway, South Carolina, U.S.
- Party: Republican
- Spouse: John Freeman (m. 2011)
- Relations: John Jenrette (uncle)
- Children: 2
- Education: Yale University (BA)
- Bessent's voice Bessent's opening statement during his Senate confirmation hearing Recorded January 16, 2025

Scott Kenneth Homer Bessent (/ˈbɛsənt/ BESS-ənt; born August 21, 1962) is an American businessman and government official serving as the 79th United States secretary of the treasury since 2025. Bessent was a partner at Soros Fund Management (SFM) and founded Key Square Group, a global macro trading firm. He is the first openly gay person to lead the U.S. Treasury, becoming the highest-ranking LGBTQ government official in American history.

Bessent graduated from Yale University in 1984. After holding a series of financial positions, he was hired by Soros Fund Management (SFM) in 1991, eventually becoming the head of its London office. While serving in the role in September 1992, he was a leading member of the SFM group, which profited by $1 billion on Black Wednesday, the British pound sterling crisis. In 2013, he made SFM another $1.2 billion by betting against the Japanese yen. After leaving the Soros Fund in 2015, Bessent established Key Square Group, another hedge fund.

Bessent served as an economic advisor, fundraiser, and major donor for the Donald Trump 2024 presidential campaign. On November 22, 2024, President-elect Trump announced his nomination of Bessent for U.S. Treasury Secretary in the second Trump administration. Bessent was confirmed by the United States Senate on January 27, 2025, by a 68–29 vote, and sworn in as the 79th U.S. treasury secretary on January 28, 2025.

== Early life ==
Scott Kenneth Homer Bessent was born on August 21, 1962, in Conway, South Carolina, to Barbara (née McLeod) and Homer Gaston Bessent Jr. The Bessent family is of French and Scottish descent, and had a Baptist affiliation at times in its history. Scott's father founded and owned one of the Grand Strand's early real estate companies. His mother, a local businesswoman, assumed responsibility for that business when Homer was ill for a period in the 1960s. Scott's mother married five times, twice to Bessent’s father. John Jenrette, a disgraced member of the United States House of Representatives, was Scott Bessent's uncle.

Bessent had a summer job as a busboy at age 9. In 1980, he graduated from North Myrtle Beach High School in Little River, South Carolina. He considered attending the United States Naval Academy but decided not to as he was unwilling to lie about his sexual orientation. Bessent graduated from Yale College in 1984 with a Bachelor of Arts degree with a major in political science. He was on the board of the Yale Daily News, acted as president of the Wolf's Head Society, and was the class treasurer. He also chaired the 1984 Yale Alumni Fund and was an assistant to the director of athletics. As an undergraduate, Bessent interned with Jim Rogers, a co-founder of the Quantum Fund, after meeting him at a Yale career center event.

== Investing career ==
=== Early and SFM work ===
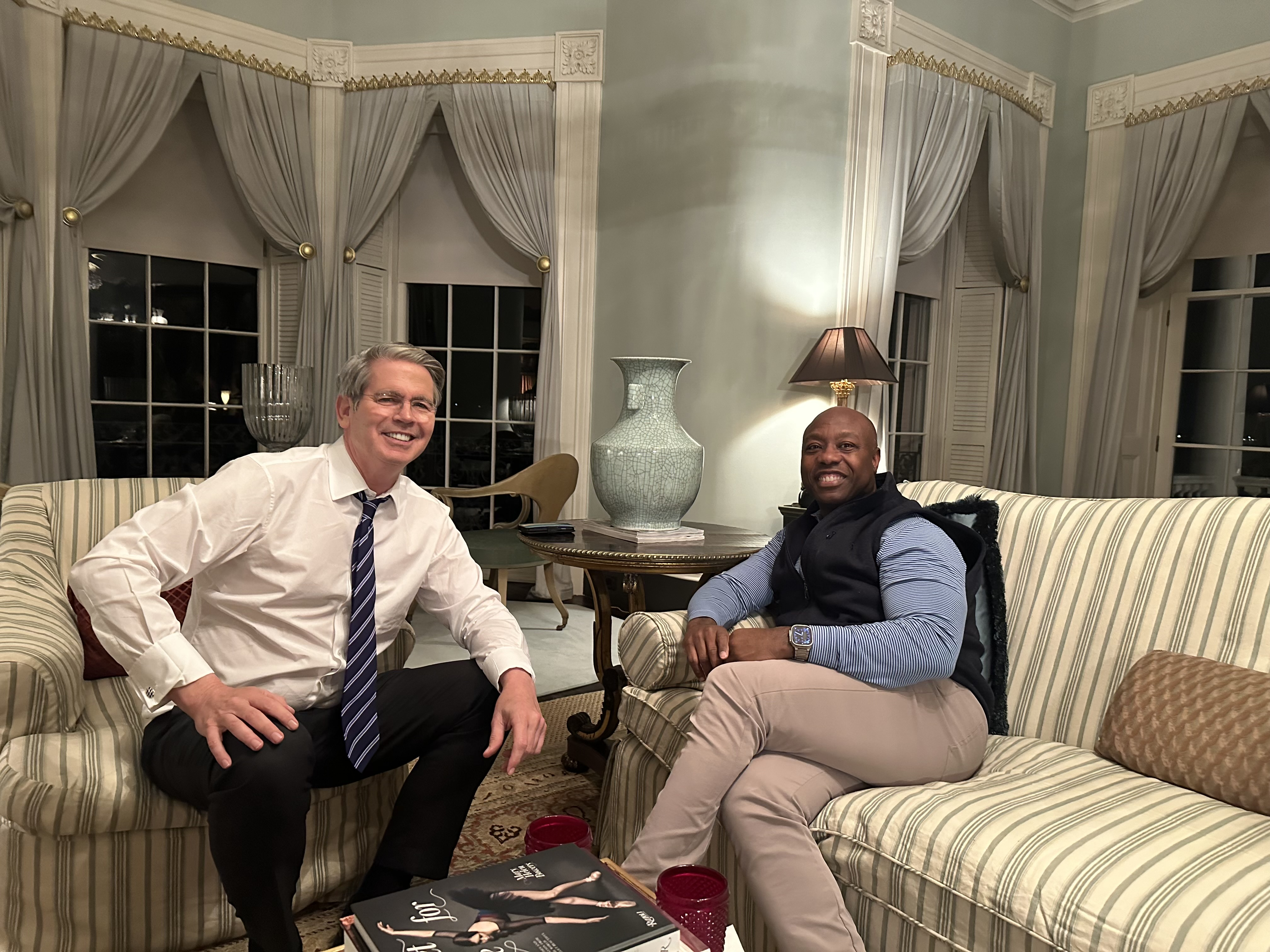
Bessent with Senator Tim Scott in 2024

After college, Bessent worked at Brown Brothers Harriman, at the Riyadh-based company Olayan Group, and then at the hedge fund Kynikos Associates, under Jim Chanos. In Business Insider, Julia La Roche connected Bessent's work with Chanos to his eventual opportunity at Soros Fund Management (SFM), noting that George Soros was a major Chanos client. In the Yale Daily News, Asher Boiskin suggested Soros himself recruited Bessent. In 1992, Bessent was a leading member of the SFM team whose bet on the Black Wednesday collapse of the British Pound sterling earned the firm over $1 billion. Some sources, such as Forbes, call Bessent a "protégé" of Soros.

After resigning from SFM in 2000, Bessent founded a $1 billion hedge fund, Bessent Capital. The fund closed in 2005. Bessent has said he learned that he should not change his style or the firm's approach because of investor preferences. He was also a senior investment adviser to fund-of-funds Protégé Partners. Bessent returned to SFM as chief investment officer from 2011 to 2015. His bet against the Japanese yen in 2013 yielded more than $1.2 billion in profit in three months.

From 2006 to 2011, Bessent was an adjunct professor of economic history at Yale, teaching three courses.

=== Key Square Group founding ===
Bessent left SFM in 2015 to launch Key Square Group, a hedge fund named after a spot on the chessboard, with Michael Germino, who had been the global head of capital markets at SFM. It received a $2 billion anchor investment from George Soros. Key Square uses geopolitics and economics to make macro investments. Its main fund returned 13% in 2016 but declined or broke even every year from 2017 to 2021 before making major gains in 2021, 2022 and 2023. The inconsistent track record scared away clients. Assets under management shrank from $5.1 billion in 2017 to $577 million in 2023 and the number of institutional investors declined from 180 to 20 over the same period. It earned a "double digits" percentage profit in 2024 betting that U.S. stocks would rise after Trump won the election.

In 2018, as part of a prearranged deal, the firm returned Soros's investment as it took in other assets. Its investors include Australia's sovereign wealth fund, Future Fund. Bessent announced that he would sever ties with the group after assuming the role of treasury secretary.

=== Real estate ===
Bessent and his husband, John Freeman, have bought and sold at least 20 properties reportedly valued in total at over $127 million as of December 2024. They also oversaw the renovation of many of these. In The Wall Street Journal, E. B. Solomont mentioned the following examples. Bessent bought a house in Bedford Hills, New York, for $11.3 million in 2007, selling it in 2011 for $7.1 million. Bessent bought a 9,700-square-foot house in Miami Beach for $9.5 million in 2010 and sold it in 2014 for $14.5 million. Also in 2010, he bought a 10,700-square-foot home in Southampton, New York, for $9.95 million; he sold it for $19 million in 2019. He purchased his unit at 720 Park Avenue for $19.25 million in 2017 and sold it for $15 million in 2021. Quartz reported that Bessent purchased a unit at One Sutton Place South in Manhattan (formerly owned by John F. Kennedy's sister) for $12 million in 2007 and sold it for $9.5 million in 2009.

In the reports, the 9,400-square-foot John Ravenel House, purchased by Bessent for $6.5 million in 2016, had not yet sold. That renovation received an award from the Preservation Society of Charleston in 2021. In March 2025, the property sold for $18.25 million, plus an additional $3 million for the furnishings and fixtures, the highest price ever paid for a house in Charleston.

The Journal and other outlets emphasize Bessent's and Freeman's losses, but the Journal says the work might not have been purely profit-driven, and the properties its article lists as having already sold reflect a net profit, with the further sale of the John Ravenel House also without loss.

==== Mortgage controversy ====
According to reporting by Bloomberg that multiple other outlets picked up, in September 2007 Bessent designated through an attorney a Bedford Hills property and a property in Provincetown, Massachusetts, as his principal residences simultaneously on mortgage documents submitted to the Bank of America, despite rider documents referencing the properties as secondary residences (his primary residence being in Manhattan at the time), a matter that received attention because of the Trump administration's use of such disclosures as leverage against people in government it wishes to replace—reporting that Bessent's legal representative called "nonsensical".

== Early involvement in politics ==
In 2000, Bessent hosted a fundraiser for Al Gore at his home in East Hampton, New York. Also in 2000, he donated $1,000 to John McCain's presidential campaign. In 2007, he donated $2,300 to Barack Obama's campaign, and in 2013, he donated $25,000 to Hillary Clinton's campaign. At the time, he was said to be a Democrat who supported liberal causes.

After Trump was elected president in 2016, Bessent donated $1 million to Trump's 2017 presidential inaugural committee. In 2023 and 2024, he donated more than $1 million to Trump's 2024 presidential campaign. In February 2024, Bessent hosted a fundraiser in Greenville, South Carolina, that raised nearly $7 million for Trump's campaign. In April, he hosted a Palm Beach, Florida, fundraiser that raised $50 million for the campaign. In July, Bessent was a key economic adviser to Trump.

== Secretary of the Treasury (2025–present) ==
=== Nomination and confirmation ===
On November 22, 2024, President-elect Donald Trump announced his intention to nominate Bessent to serve as the United States secretary of the treasury in his second administration. On January 16, 2025, Bessent appeared before the United States Senate Committee on Finance. At his confirmation hearing, Bessent advocated for tax cut extensions and tougher economic policies on China and Russia.

On January 21, 2025, the U.S. Senate Committee on Finance advanced Bessent's nomination to the Senate floor by a 16–11 vote. On January 27, 2025, the Senate voted 68–29 to confirm Bessent's nomination. The same day, a woman with multiple Molotov cocktails and a knife who intended to murder Bessent was arrested at the United States Capitol. On August 18, 2026, the woman, Raleigh Jane English, was sentenced to 73 months in federal prison and 3 years of supervised release after pleading guilty to attempting to assassinate Bessent. It was also noted that in 2025 the United States Capitol Police saw a 57.7% increase in tips its threat investigators reviewed.

=== Tenure ===
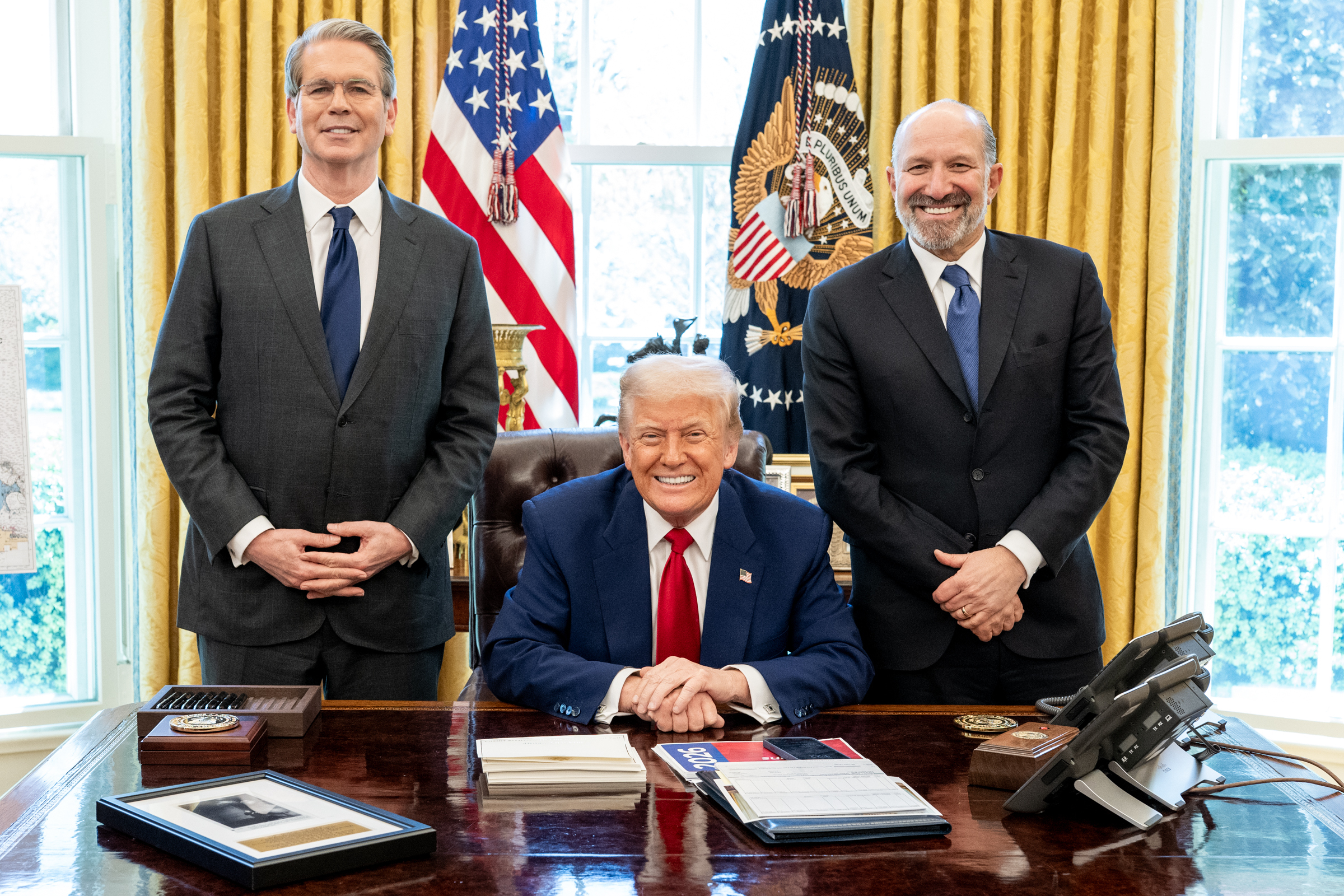
Bessent with president Donald Trump and commerce secretary Howard Lutnick in April 2025

On January 28, 2025, Bessent was sworn in as the 79th secretary of the treasury by U.S. Supreme Court justice Brett Kavanaugh. Bessent became the first openly gay person to lead the U.S. Treasury Department, the first openly gay U.S. Senate-confirmed Cabinet member in a Republican administration, and the second openly gay U.S. Senate-confirmed Cabinet secretary.

On January 31, 2025, Bessent granted the Department of Government Efficiency team access to the Treasury Department's payment system. On February 3, 2025, he was named the acting director of the Consumer Financial Protection Bureau; he immediately ordered the agency to halt all work.

In February 2025, Bessent and acting United States Secretary of Commerce Jeremy Pelter were tasked with implementing a United States sovereign wealth fund.

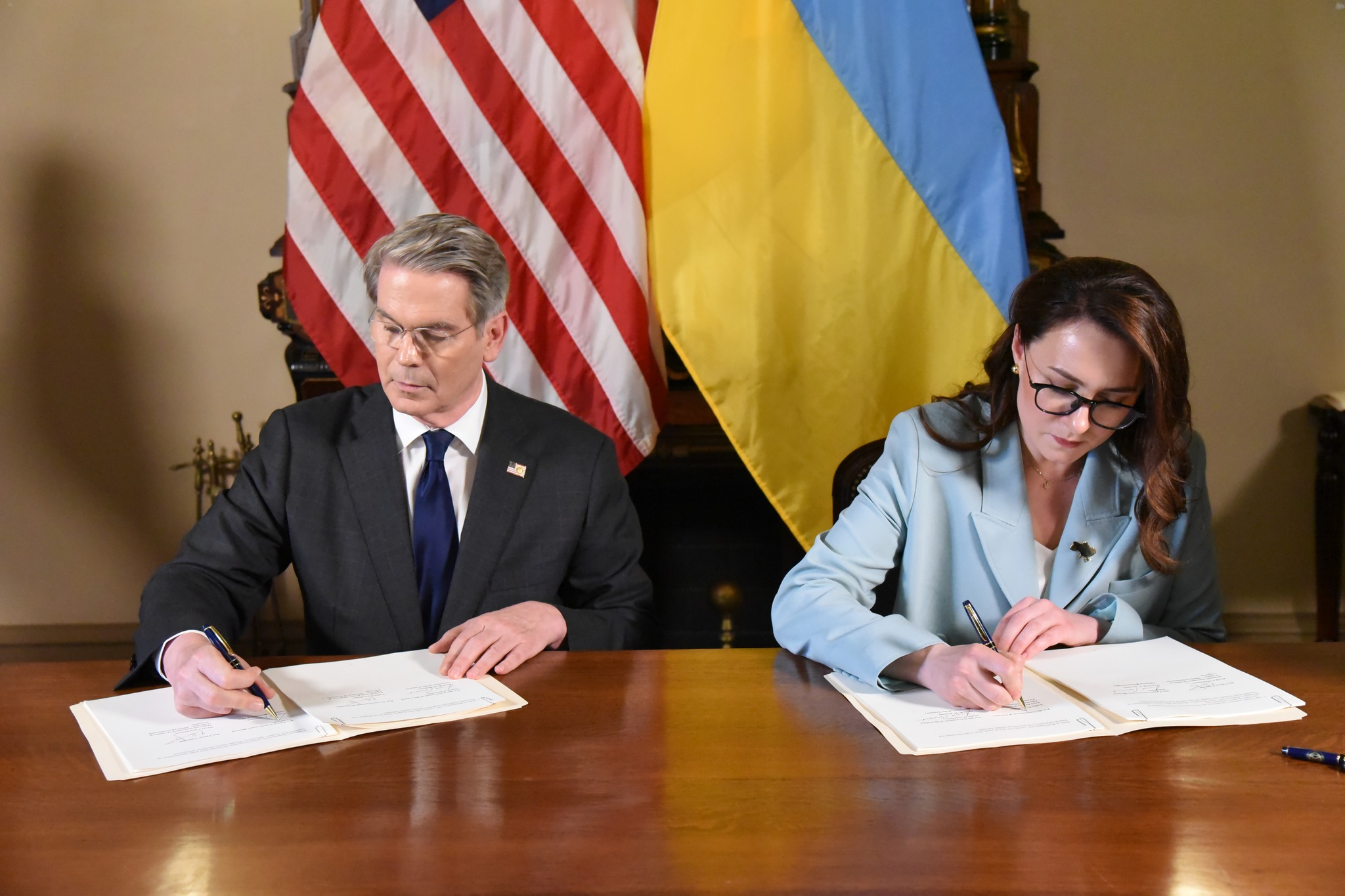
Bessent and Ukrainian first deputy prime minister Yulia Svyrydenko signing the mineral resources agreement on April 30, 2025

In August 2025, the Office of Government Ethics notified Senate Committee on Finance chair Mike Crapo that Bessent "has failed to timely comply with certain terms of the ethics agreement he signed".

On October 15, 2025, Bessent said the U.S. would work to create a strategic mineral reserve, potentially with JPMorgan Chase. He added that the U.S. would set price floors across multiple industries, and potentially take equity stakes in other rare-earth element companies to reduce reliance on China, as the U.S. Department of Defense did in July 2025 with MP Materials.

On November 28, after the 2025 Washington, D.C., National Guard shooting, Bessent announced that the Treasury Department would move to reclassify certain tax credits as federal public benefits so as to "cut off federal benefits to illegal aliens and preserve them for U.S. citizens". Affected tax credits include the American Opportunity Tax Credit and the earned income tax credit, among others.

On January 26, 2026, Bessent announced that the Treasury would terminate 31 government contracts with Booz Allen Hamilton, due in part to the actions of Charles Littlejohn.

In August 2026, with Bessent's support, the Treasury repealed its implementation of the Corporate Transparency Act, which contained numerous anti-money laundering provisions. The move effectively re-legalized anonymous shell corporations.

In mid-August 2026, Bessent said he had a "big toolkit" to tackle problems with the U.S. government bond market amid rising yields for long-dated bonds, and announced that the Treasury would double bond buybacks from September onward.

In August 2026, Bessent defended the Treasury Department's intervention in the Japanese yen after Elizabeth Warren questioned the transaction, saying that Treasury had exchanged existing foreign-currency assets from the Exchange Stabilization Fund for yen and that Japan had not borrowed from Treasury.

==== Foreign policy ====
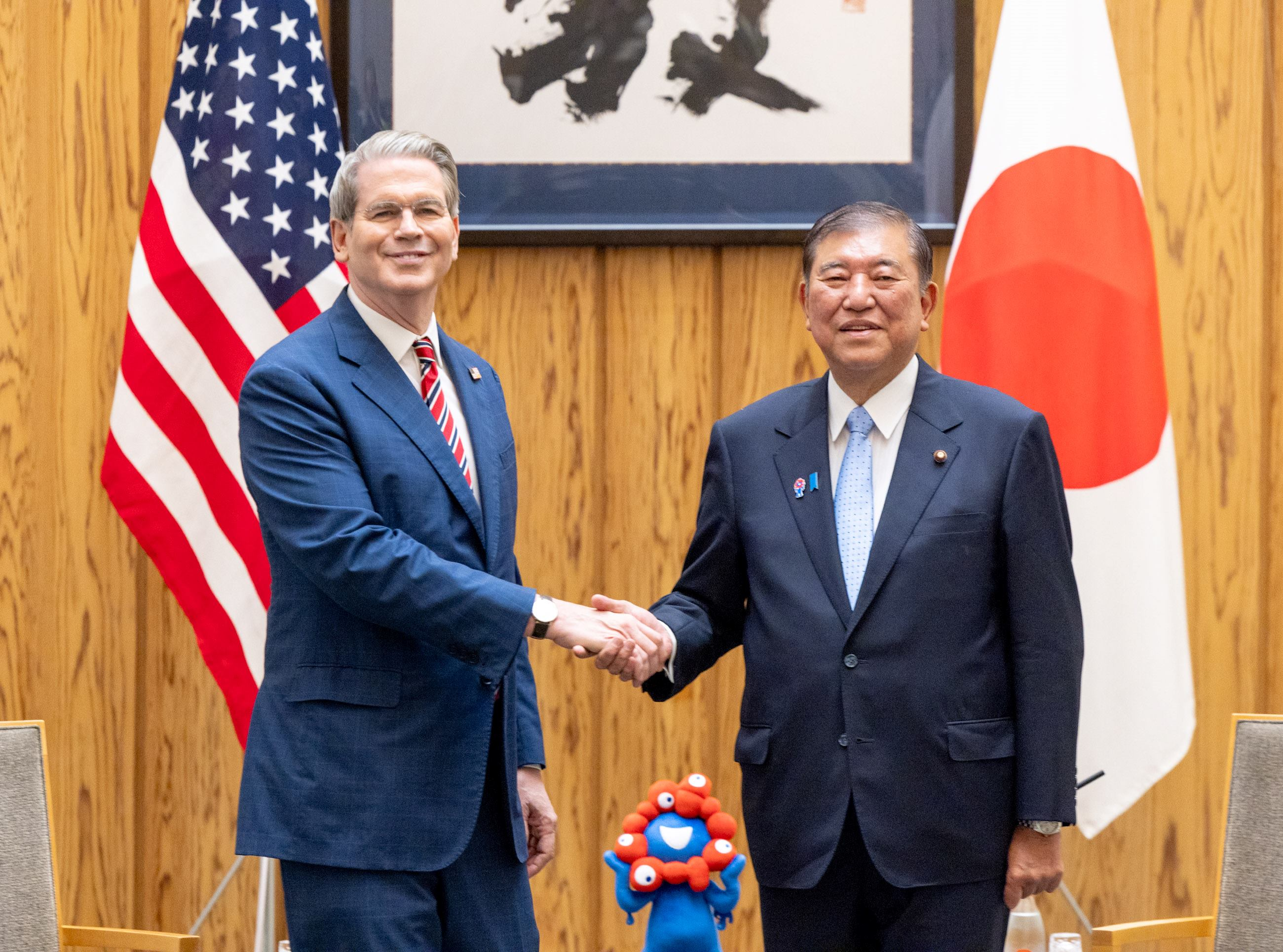
Bessent with Japanese prime minister Shigeru Ishiba on July 18, 2025

On September 24, 2025, Bessent announced a planned $20 billion economic lifeline to Argentina to purchase government bonds and help stabilize the nation's economy. The purchase was finalized on October 9. On October 15, Bessent said he was negotiating deals for the private sector to give Argentina another $20 billion, adding that several banks and sovereign wealth funds had expressed interest. On January 9, 2026, Bessent said that Argentina had fully repaid its currency draw, estimated by local newspapers at $2.5 billion of the potential $20 billion. He added that since the swap, the Exchange Stabilization Fund now holds no Argentine pesos.

On October 22, 2025, the U.S. imposed sanctions on Russian energy companies Rosneft and Lukoil over continued fighting in Ukraine. Bessent wrote in a statement: "Given President Putin's refusal to end this senseless war, Treasury is sanctioning Russia's two largest oil companies that fund the Kremlin's war machine. We encourage our allies to join us in and adhere to these sanctions."

In November 2025, Bessent voiced his support for the sale of F-35 Lightning II fighter jets to Saudi Arabia. In January 2026, the Treasury Department imposed sanctions on Iranian officials in response to Iran's crackdown on protesters. Bessent wrote: "U.S. Treasury knows, that like rats on a sinking ship, you are frantically wiring funds stolen from Iranian families to banks and financial institutions around the world. Rest assured, we will track them and you."

At a July 31 meeting of Trump's cabinet at Camp David, Bessent inadvertently revealed his to-do list to a photographer. It contained plans for the U.S. to buy between $5 billion and $10 billion worth of Japanese yen.

==== Iran War ====
In response to the 2025–2026 Iranian protests, Bessent said that Iran's economic collapse was partly due to U.S. sanctions and said, "the Iranian economy is on the ropes". He also said the U.S. had triggered a dollar shortage in Iran, causing the Iranian rial to collapse. During the 2026 Iran War, Bessent said the U.S. had seized roughly $1 billion in Iranian crypto assets, frozen Iranian bank accounts, and pressured foreign governments to cut ties with Iran.

On August 5, 2026, the Treasury Department lifted sanctions on the Iraqi airline Fly Baghdad that were imposed in 2024 due to reported changes in behavior related to the Quds Force.

On August 7, the Treasury Department imposed new sanctions on two crypto exchanges, Shelbit and Aban Tether due to links to the Islamic Republic of Iran. This was part of the wider Economic Fury campaign against Iran

In August 2026, Bessent announced the US would impose "the toughest sanctions in history" against Iran amid its refusal to reopen the Strait of Hormuz. Later that month, Bessent announced an economic campaign, Operation Economic Outcast, that will involve imposing sanctions on countries that continue to trade with Iran in an attempt to decimate the Iranian economy and pivot away from the kinetic campaign earlier in the year.

==== Political feuds ====
In February 2025, shortly before the Trump–Zelenskyy Oval Office meeting, Bessent reportedly urged Trump to not host Ukrainian President Volodymyr Zelenskyy at the White House. According to Maggie Haberman's book Regime Change, Bessent called Zelenskyy a "little fucker" and "like the special-needs child for the Europeans...like Mr. Bean on crack". Bessent had previously met with Zelenskyy to negotiate the Ukraine–United States Mineral Resources Agreement, which led to a 45-minute shouting match between the men.

In April 2025, Trump initially named Gary Shapley as Commissioner of Internal Revenue, but Shapley was soon replaced by Michael Faulkender, Bessent's preferred pick, after Bessent lobbied Trump. This led to a dispute between Bessent and Elon Musk and reportedly a shouting match. On August 8, The New York Times reported that Trump was removing Billy Long as commissioner of internal revenue in preparation for an ambassadorship nomination; Bessent was named as Long's acting successor.

In September 2025, Bessent reportedly clashed with Federal Housing Finance Agency director Bill Pulte and threatened to punch him. When asked about the incident by a journalist, Bessent quipped, "Treasury secretaries dating back to Alexander Hamilton have a history of dueling...I turned out a little better for the Treasury's side this time." In June 2026, Senator Thom Tillis of the Senate Finance Committee asked Bessent whether reports that he had threatened to punch Pulte were accurate; Bessent replied, "No, sir, I actually said I was going to kick his ass."

In January 2026, Bessent engaged in a public spat with California Governor Gavin Newsom after Newsom criticized Trump at the 56th World Economic Forum. At Davos, Newsom brandished a pair of kneepads with Trump's signature on them to criticize world leaders' perceived weakness in responding to Trump. In response, Bessent said that Newsom has "a brain the size of a walnut" and that "if you brought the kneepads, maybe that was for his meeting with Alex Soros." Newsom later attacked Bessent in response, while Bessent called Newsom "Patrick Bateman meets Sparkle Beach Ken".

== Political views ==
=== Domestic ===
Bessent has characterized the present U.S. economy as a "barbell economy", explaining that while it has powerful financial and raw material sectors, it also possesses a weakened working class. He proposed a three-point economic plan for Trump modeled on Abenomics (lower deficit, monetary easing, and fiscal stimulus). Bessent opposes raising the federal minimum wage in the United States, calling it "more of a statewide and regional issue". He supports lowering interest rates, continuing Social Security, reducing government intervention in the economy, easing Supplementary Leverage Ratio regulations on banks, and expanding nuclear power. He also supported the One Big Beautiful Bill Act, praising the creation of Trump Accounts.

Bessent supports a strong dollar policy, differing from Trump and Vice President JD Vance, who have spoken in favor of a weak dollar policy. He has been labeled a gold bug, calling gold a historical "store of value". Bessent is pro-crypto and supports federal regulations on stablecoins, as well as the U.S. Strategic Bitcoin Reserve. After the penny was phased out due to its negative seigniorage, he expressed support for changing the composition of the nickel to cheaper materials to get production costs below 5 cents. Bessent endorsed the creation of the proposed $250 bill.

Bessent opposes the creation of a U.S. central bank digital currency. He supports establishing a U.S. sovereign wealth fund, and has proposed including government-sponsored enterprises in the fund. He supports raising FDIC insurance limits on bank accounts; as of 2025 they are set at $250,000. He supports abolition of the U.S. Senate filibuster.

Bessent proposed seeking an early confirmation of a replacement for Chair of the Federal Reserve Jerome Powell, whose term expired in May 2026, as a way to reduce Powell's influence, prompting some criticism. Bessent later "walked back" the idea.

=== Foreign ===
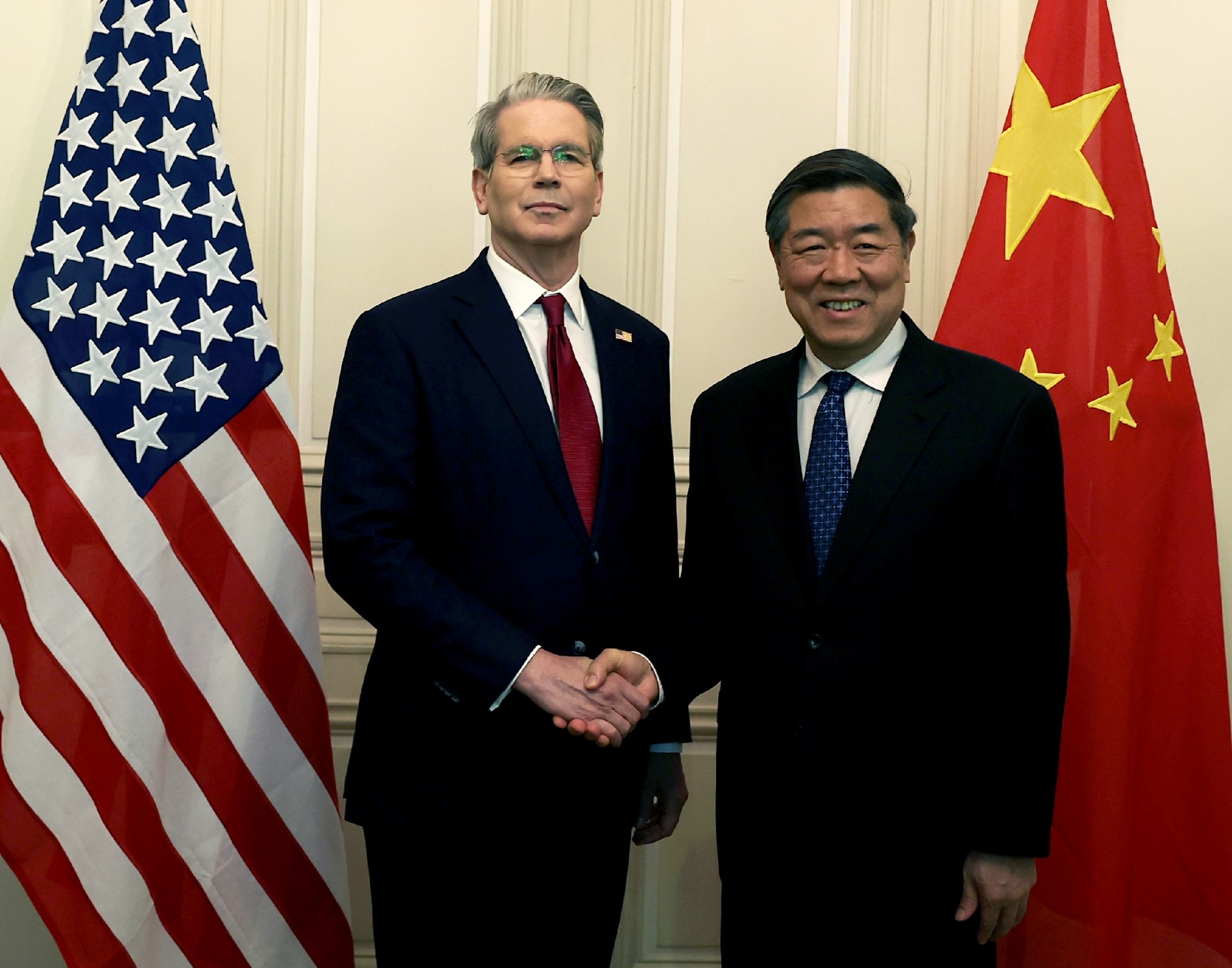
Bessent with China's vice premier He Lifeng, during US–China trade talks in Geneva, Switzerland, May 2025

In 2022, Bessent praised Trump and former Japanese prime minister Shinzo Abe for containing China. He called China "ever more antagonistic". Bessent has supported tariffs in the second Trump administration. In a November 2024 Fox News op-ed, he wrote that the "U.S. opened its markets to the world, but China's resulting economic growth has only cemented the hold of a despotic regime" and argued tariffs "are a means to finally stand up for Americans". In March 2025, amid Trump's threats to impose tariffs on Canada and Mexico, Bessent defended the tariffs, saying, "access to cheap goods is not the essence of the American Dream." In April 2025, after Trump announced Liberation Day tariffs, Bessent warned countries against retaliating, promising escalation. On April 9, Trump paused many of the tariffs; Bessent and Commerce Secretary Howard Lutnick were credited with convincing Trump to do so. Bessent has advocated pressuring U.S. trading partners to restrict their economic relationships with China.

In August 2025, Bessent accused India of profiting from reselling Russian oil during Russia's war against Ukraine and said, "This is what I would call the Indian arbitrage—buying cheap Russian oil, reselling it as product. They've made $16 billion in excess profits—some of the richest families in India."

In September 2025, Bessent voiced support for more secondary sanctions on Russia to "collapse" the Russian economy, saying the Trump administration is "prepared to increase pressure on Russia, but we need our European partners to follow us". After an October meeting between two leaders at the APEC Summit in South Korea, Bessent said that China's decision to restrict rare earth exports might have been a strategic miscalculation, as it encouraged other countries to reduce reliance on Chinese supplies and develop alternative sources. He suggested that the policy could lessen China's leverage within two years as global supply chains diversify.

In January 2026, amid strained Canadian-U.S. relations, Bessent spoke in support of Alberta separatism, backing an October 2026 independence referendum there. He warned Canadian prime minister Mark Carney that his public criticisms of Trump's trade policies could lead to a formal review of the United States–Mexico–Canada Agreement.

== Wealth ==
According to his financial assets disclosure by the U.S. Office of Government Ethics, Bessent's net worth was at least $521 million as of December 28, 2024; his actual net worth is speculated to be around $600 million. At that time, he owned more than $50 million in each of the SPDR S&P 500 ETF Trust, the Invesco S&P 500 Equal Weight ETF, and the Invesco QQQ, as well as real estate in the Bahamas worth $5 million to $25 million and a home in Cashiers, North Carolina, worth $5 million to $25 million. In 2025, he owned farmland worth up to $25 million in North Dakota that provides him a rental income of up to $1 million per year. Bessent said he divested his North Dakota farmland in December 2025 as part of his ethics agreement as secretary of the treasury.

== Personal life ==
Bessent lives in Charleston, South Carolina, and Washington, D.C. He previously lived in Greenwich, Connecticut. He is a member of the Huguenot Church, a non-denominational Christian religious association whose expansion his ancestors supported in 1680. He is gay and married, since 2011, to John Freeman, a former New York City prosecutor. They have two children, born through surrogacy.

Bessent reportedly has a close friendship with King Charles III. He was also friends with Donald Trump's brother Robert, whose ex-wife, Blaine Trump, is the godmother of Bessent's daughter.

=== Philanthropy ===
Bessent and his sister Wyn made donations to establish the H. Gaston Bessent, Jr. Library at Yale University, in their father's honor. Bessent, Wyn, and the rest of their family created the Kenneth V. McLeod Rehabilitation Center at the Shriners Hospital for Children in Greenville, South Carolina, in memory of their maternal grandfather. He has supported restoration of the Nathaniel Russell House, a National Historic Landmark in Charleston. Bessent also supports the King's Trust in London and the Harlem Children's Zone in New York City.

=== Clubs ===
Bessent has participated in Dialog, a secretive, invitation-only social club founded by Peter Thiel and Auren Hoffman. He is a member of the Economic Club of New York.

== Written works ==
- Bessent, Scott (2020), Is the Dollar Crash Coming? (PDF), The International Economy, p. 25
- Bessent, Scott (2023), Abe's Complicated Legacy (PDF), The International Economy, pp. 14–17, 56–61
- Bessent, Scott (2023), The Crackup of Today's "Everything Bubble" (PDF), The International Economy, p. 4
- Bessent, Scott (2024), Biden's triple threat is financially toxic for average Americans, Fox News
- Bessent, Scott (2024), 16 Nobel Prize-winning economists claim Trump will wreck our economy. This is the reason I don't trust them, Fox News
- Bessent, Scott (2024), A Trump adviser on how the international economic system should change, The Economist
- Bessent, Scott (2025), SCOTT BESSENT: Let's talk tariffs. It's time to revitalize Alexander Hamilton's favorite tool, Fox News
- Bessent, Scott (2025), Economic partnership will protect the Ukrainian people and the US taxpayer, The Financial Times
- Bessent, Scott (2025), Rolling Back Mission Creep (PDF), The International Economy, pp. 44–45, 63
- Bessent, Scott (2025), Trump's Three Steps to Economic Growth, The Wall Street Journal
- Bessent, Scott (2025), SCOTT BESSENT: President Trump's "big, beautiful bill" will unleash parallel prosperity, Fox News
- Bessent, Scott (2025), The Fed's "Gain of Function" Monetary Policy, The Wall Street Journal
- Bessent, Scott (2025), It's time to end the filibuster, The Washington Post
- Bessent, Scott (2026), SEC SCOTT BESSENT: How to stop fraud in Minnesota—and across the country, Fox News
- Bessent, Scott (2026), Digital Asset Rules Need Clarity, The Wall Street Journal

Political offices
Preceded by Janet Yellen	United States Secretary of the Treasury; 2025–present	Incumbent
Government offices
Preceded by Zixta Martinez; Acting	Director of the Consumer Financial Protection Bureau; Acting; 2025	Succeeded by Russell Vought; Acting
Preceded by Billy Long	Commissioner of Internal Revenue; Acting; 2025–2026	Vacant
Order of precedence
Preceded by Stephen Breyer as Retired Associate Justice of the Supreme Court	Order of precedence of the United States as Secretary of the Treasury	Succeeded by Pete Hegseth as Secretary of Defense
U.S. presidential line of succession
Preceded by Marco Rubio as Secretary of State	Fifth in line as Secretary of the Treasury	Succeeded by Pete Hegseth as Secretary of Defense
