= Simmons-Edwards House =

Historic house in South Carolina, United States

- U.S. National Register of Historic Places
- U.S. National Historic Landmark
- U.S. National Historic Landmark District – Contributing property
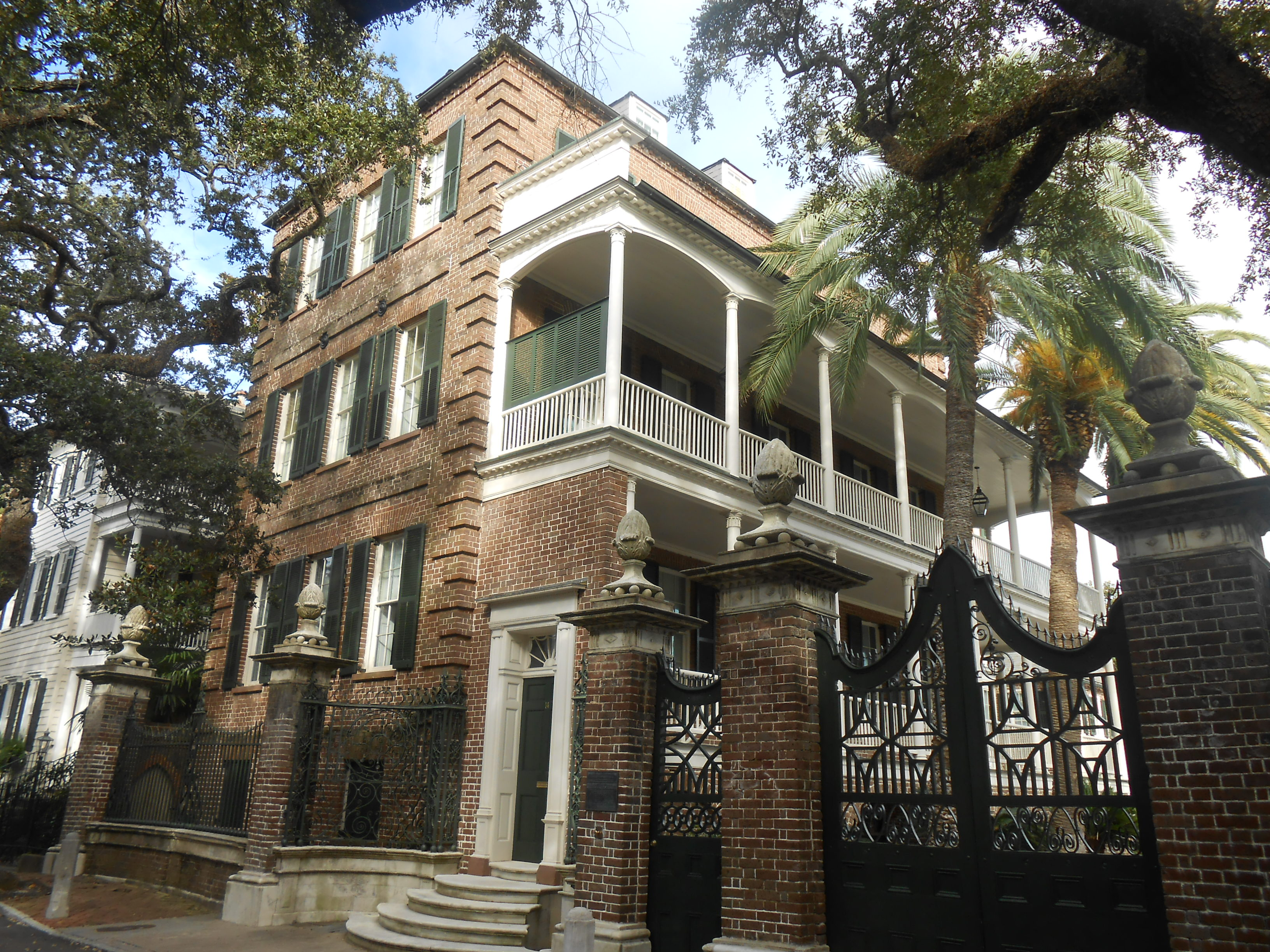

- Location within South Carolina Location within the United States
- Location: 12–14 Legare St., Charleston, South Carolina
- Coordinates: 32°46′22.096″N 79°56′1.575″W
- Built: 1800
- Architectural style: Federal
- Part of: Charleston Historic District (ID66000964)
- NRHP reference No.: 71000753

Significant dates
- Added to NRHP: January 25, 1971
- Designated NHL: November 7, 1973
- Designated NHLDCP: October 9, 1960

The large, neoclassical Simmons-Edwards House is a Charleston single house built for Francis Simmons, a Johns Island planter, about 1800. The house, located at 14 Legare St., Charleston, South Carolina, is famous for its large brick gates with decorative wrought iron. The gates include finials that were carved to resemble Italian pinecones. They are frequently referred to as pineapples by locals, and the house is known popularly as the Pineapple Gates House.

It was declared a National Historic Landmark in 1973.

== History ==
The house is located at 14 Legare St., Charleston, South Carolina. The famous gates were installed by George Edwards (who owned the house until 1835) and which bear his initials, include finials that were carved to resemble Italian pinecones.

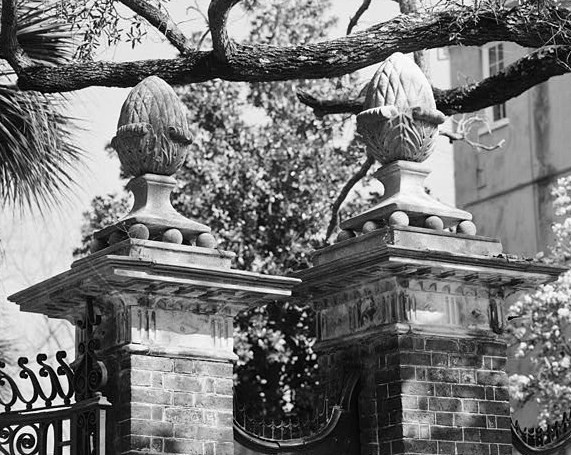
Pineapple Gates of the Simons-Edwards House

According to the South Carolina Department of Archives and History, "In 1816, George Edwards purchased the property and enlarged the premises, creating a garden which was separated from the house yard by a notable fence of wrought iron which had unusual stuccoed columns topped with sandstone balls."

The house was occupied by James Adger Smyth, a mayor of Charleston from 1879 until he died on April 25, 1920. In 1951, Dr. L.S. Fuller and Mrs. Josephine Wilson sold the house to Standard Oil executive Bushrod B. Howard and his wife for $50,000. The Howards in turn sold the house for $100,000 (the highest price paid for a house in Charleston at that time) to Nancy Stevenson, the lieutenant governor of South Carolina during part of the Richard Riley administration and wife of Norman Stevenson.

In April 1987, Thomas R. Bennett, a Charleston real estate agent, bought the house for $800,000. In May 1989, Bennett sold the house for $2 million to William and Cynthia Gilliam (again the highest price paid for a Charleston house at the time), and the Gilliams sold the house to the notorious artworld figure Andrew Crispo for $2,050,000 in September 1990.

In April 1997, an executive with Goldman Sachs, John L. Thornton, purchased the house following a court-ordered auction to help satisfy the debts of its former owner, the scandal besieged art dealer Andrew Crispo. The $3.1 million high bid was the highest price paid for a house in Charleston at the time. The Thorntons are responsible for an extensive, heavily researched restoration of the gardens.

| Preceded by William Gibbes House | Most Expensive House in Charleston, South Carolina; April 1987-December 1988 | Succeeded by Caspar Christian Schutt House |

| Preceded by Caspar Christian Schutt House | Most Expensive House in Charleston, South Carolina; May 1989-July 2001 | Succeeded by Charles Pinckney House |

== See also ==
- List of National Historic Landmarks in South Carolina
- National Register of Historic Places listings in Charleston, South Carolina
- Colonel John Stuart House
