= Ukraine–United States Mineral Resources Agreement =

Bilateral investment treaty between Ukraine and the United States

Agreement between the Government of Ukraine and the Government of the United States of America on the Establishment of a United States-Ukraine Reconstruction Investment Fund
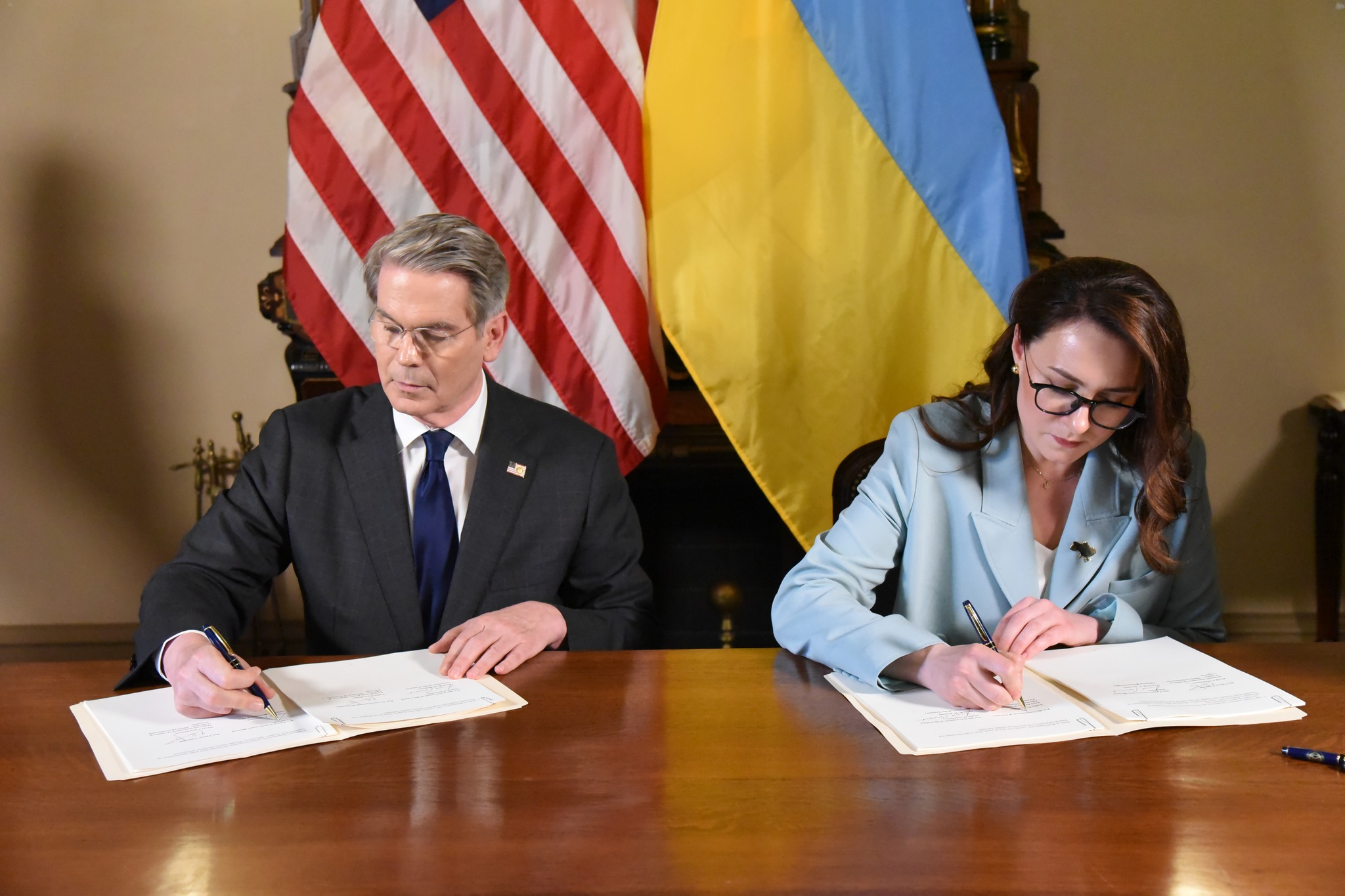
- Type: Framework agreement
- Drafted: 25 February 2025
- Signed: 30 April 2025
- Location: Washington, D.C., United States
- Effective: 23 May 2025
- Signatories: Yulia Svyrydenko, Minister of Economic Development and Trade; Scott Bessent, Secretary of the Treasury
- Parties: Ukraine; United States
- Languages: English; Ukrainian

Full text
- File:Agreement between the Government of Ukraine and the Government of the United States of America on the Establishment of a United States-Ukraine Reconstruction Investment Fund.pdf at Wikisource

The Ukraine–United States Mineral Resources Agreement is an agreement between the United States and Ukraine establishing terms for joint investment in Ukraine's natural resources, including critical rare-earth elements, oil, and gas, as well as providing for reconstruction efforts.

On 25 February 2025 Ukrainian Prime Minister Denys Shmyhal announced that the two countries had reached a preliminary agreement to strengthen economic cooperation and attract investments for Ukraine's recovery from the Russo-Ukrainian war following the 2022 Russian invasion of Ukraine. U.S. President Donald Trump insisted on a resources agreement as a condition for continued U.S. support, framing it as a means for Ukraine to "pay back" the substantial U.S. aid provided during the conflict.

The agreement was signed on 30 April 2025 by U.S. Treasury Secretary Scott Bessent and Ukrainian First Deputy Prime Minister Yulia Svyrydenko. In addition, two supplemental agreements were signed on May 13 which have not been made public.

Some scholars have suggested that the deal represents an example of neocolonialism.

== Background ==
In September 2024, Ukrainian President Volodymyr Zelenskyy proposed U.S. participation in developing Ukraine's natural resources in exchange for continued support in countering Russian aggression. Ukraine possesses significant deposits of minerals, including lithium, graphite, manganese, and titanium ore. Many of these resources remain unexploited, while some deposits are located in territories occupied by Russia.

On 16 October 2024, Zelenskyy put forth his proposed План перемоги ("Victory plan") to the Ukrainian parliament which outlined strategies to strengthen Ukraine and potentially end the conflict with Russia. This included a "special agreement on joint investment and use" of Ukraine's natural resources—such as uranium, titanium, and lithium—with the European Union and the United States. The plan also included a renewed request for inclusion in NATO and a robust post-war security framework. The defense aspect of the proposal included assistance in deterring Russian aggression. French Defense Minister Sebastien Lecornu—under instruction from French President Emmanuel Macron —entered into bilateral discussion with Ukraine on the country's rare earth minerals in October 2024 for the French defense industry.

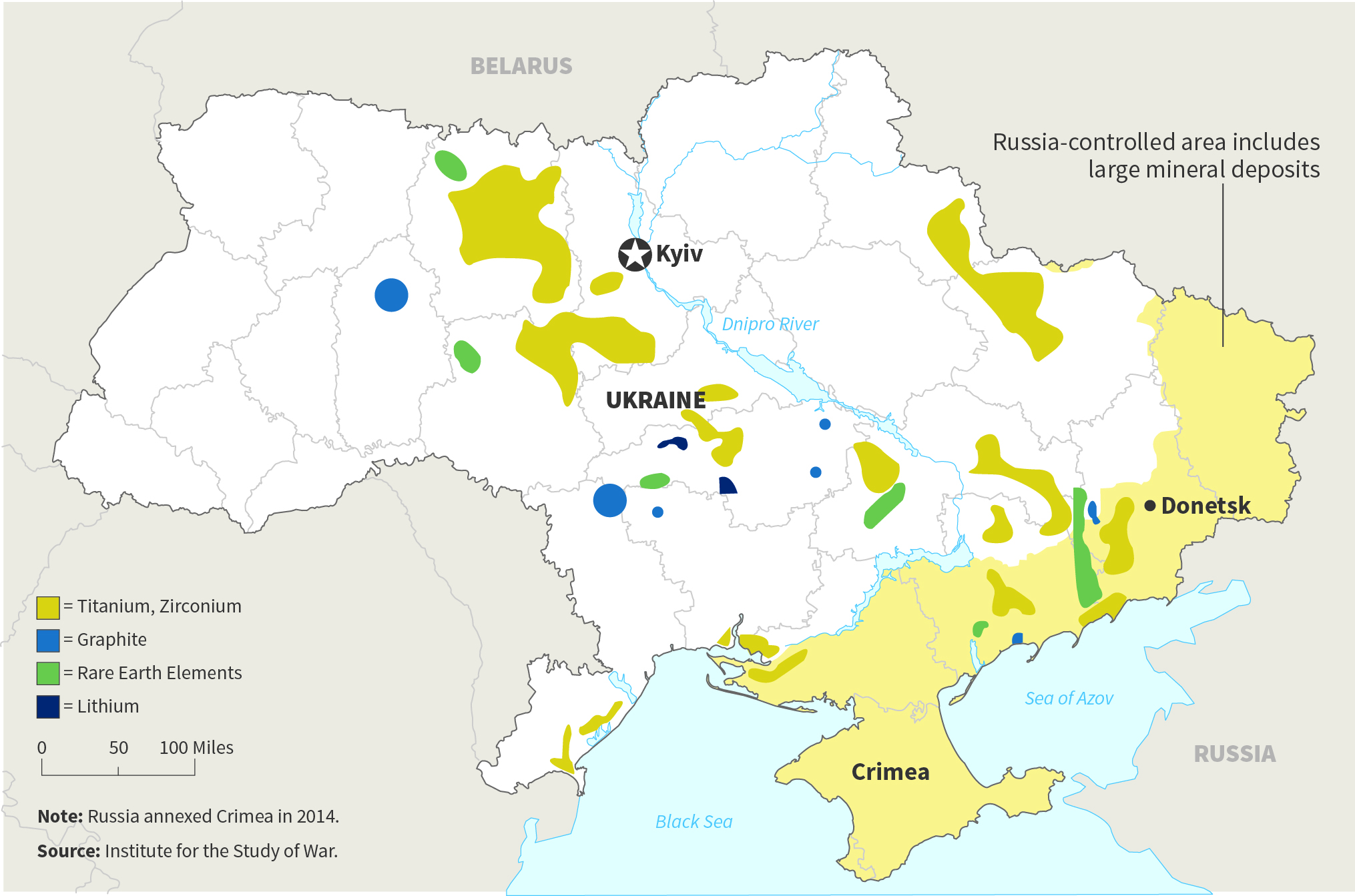
Ukraine mineral deposits

Following the November election, U.S. President Donald Trump began demanding US$500 billion as compensation from Ukraine to pay back U.S. aid during the war. Zelenskyy said that this would amount to "selling" Ukraine. Trump replied by saying Zelenskyy was "a dictator".

On 3 February 2025, Trump said that continual support from the United States would be conditional on the acquisition of Ukraine's rare minerals. However, this condition was later excluded from the agreement.

During his 24 February 2025, Oval Office meeting with Macron, Trump incorrectly complained that the United States had contributed US$350 billion which was a much larger contribution than that of the European Union. Macron sought security guarantees from the Trump administration if a ceasefire with Russia is realized. The Congressional Research Service said that from 2022 to 2024, the appropriation was US$182 billion. Trump's demand for the resources agreement is a way for Ukraine to "pay back" the U.S. aid already provided to Ukraine and is a condition of any ongoing support. On 24 February, Trump said that they were close to an agreement "where we get our money back over a period of time."

On 28 February 2025, Zelenskyy met at the White House in Washington with Trump and U.S. Vice President JD Vance, for a bilateral meeting in the Oval Office to sign the agreement. The meeting ended abruptly and the Resources Agreement was not signed.

According to The Guardian, on 2 March, Zelenskyy said that the "deal on minerals was now ready to be signed."

Towards the end of Trump's speech to a joint session of Congress on 4 March, Trump made a statement directed at Zelenskyy that The New York Times described as "conciliatory."

== Negotiation process ==
According to a 27 February The Kyiv Independent article, French Defense Minister Lecornu had been in talks with Ukraine since the fall of 2024 on Ukraine's rare earth minerals, following Zelenskyy's 16 October 2024 victory plan proposal. Cornu clarified that it was not Trump, but Zelenskyy and his team who had introduced the issue of the potential of transactional opportunities of natural resources.

A draft of the 25 February proposal entitled "Bilateral Agreement Establishing Terms and Conditions for a Reconstruction Investment Fund" published by CNN, did not provide explicit future security guarantees to Ukraine. Zelenskyy described it as a framework for the 28 February in-person meeting in Washington. The draft proposed a joint-ownership Reconstruction Investment Fund.

The 25 February draft agreement—as reported by Reuters—indicated that U.S. Treasury Secretary Scott Bessent and Ukrainian Foreign Minister Andrii Sybiha were designated to sign the document.

According to The Kyiv Independent, Zelenskyy's main objective for the 28 February 2025 Oval Office meeting with Trump was to "discuss the deal and a possible inclusion of security guarantees", to call on him to not abandon Ukraine, and to caution him against becoming too close to President Putin. The meeting began well but when Zelenskyy said that Putin was not trustworthy and had previously broken promises to end fighting, Vance rebuked him. Trump said that Putin had never broken an agreement with him. Trump accused Zelenskyy of "killing a very large number of people", "gambling with World War III" and being "very disrespectful to the country, this country that's backed you far more than a lot of people say they should have", and the Ukrainian delegation was asked to leave the White House. With the abrupt ending of the meeting between Trump and Zelenskyy, the agreement was not signed.

On 2 March at the 2025 London Summit on Ukraine in a meeting with King Charles III, Zelenskyy told the British media that he believed that the relationship between the United States and Ukraine could be restored, and that he would sign the mineral resources deal.

== Agreement ==
=== Key provisions ===
The agreement stipulates the establishment of a jointly-owned and managed "United States-Ukraine Reconstruction Investment Fund" to foster lasting peace and economic security in Ukraine. Its primary mechanisms include:

- Revenue sharing: Ukraine contributes 50% of royalties, rent payments, and license fees from designated natural resource assets (including titanium, lithium, and uranium). This revenue sharing applies only to new investments and projects; existing projects (like those by companies such as Naftogaz and Ukrnafta) are explicitly exempt from contributing to the fund, ensuring Ukraine retains full control over its current strategic assets.
- Military aid: the United States' financial commitment is structured as a capital contribution. In addition to purely financial contribution, any new military aid (such as weapons systems, ammunition, or training) is treated as capital contribution.
- Governance: the fund will be managed on a 50-50 partnership basis, giving both nations equal voting rights. The U.S. International Development Finance Corporation (DFC) is designated as the primary U.S. implementing agency.

=== Text ===
Text of the agreement signed on April 30 in Ukrainian and English (both versions enforceable).

Угода між Урядом України та Урядом Сполучених Штатів Америки про створення Американсько-українського інвестиційного фонду відбудови

БЕРУЧИ до уваги, що Сполучені Штати Америки надали значну фінансову та матеріальну підтримку Україні з моменту повномасштабного вторгнення Росії в Україну в лютому 2022 року;

БЕРУЧИ до уваги, що американський народ бажає інвестувати разом з Україною у вільну, суверенну та безпечну Україну;

БЕРУЧИ до уваги, що Україна та Сполучені Штати Америки прагнуть тривалого миру в Україні та міцного партнерства між їхніми народами та урядами;

БЕРУЧИ до уваги, що Україна та Сполучені Штати Америки визнають внесок, який зробила Україна у зміцнення міжнародного миру та безпеки, добровільно відмовившись від третього за величиною у світі арсеналу ядерної зброї;

БЕРУЧИ до уваги, що Україна та Сполучені Штати Америки бажають забезпечити, щоб ті держави та інші особи, які діяли вороже проти України в конфлікті, не отримали вигоди від відбудови України після приходу тривалого миру;

БЕРУЧИ до уваги, що Україна та Сполучені Штати Америки прагнуть створити умови, необхідні, серед інших цілей, для збільшення інвестицій у видобуток корисних копалин, енергетику та пов'язані з ними технології в Україні від третіх сторін, включаючи, але не тільки, міжнародних інвесторів, що базуються у Сполучених Штатах Америки, Європейському Союзі та інших державах, які підтримують оборону України від повномасштабного вторгнення Росії;

БЕРУЧИ до уваги, що Сполучені Штати Америки визнають намір України уникнути конфліктів при підготовці цієї Угоди із зобов'язаннями України щодо набуття нею членства в Європейському Союзі або угодами з міжнародними фінансовими установами чи іншими офіційними кредиторами;

БЕРУЧИ до уваги, що Україна має, відповідно до міжнародного права, суверенітет над своїми природними ресурсами, розташованими на її території, а також у її територіальних водах, а також суверенні права на її виключну економічну зону та континентальний шельф, які дозволяють Україні укладати цю Угоду та виконувати цілі цієї Угоди;

БЕРУЧИ до уваги, що Україна зберігає за собою право визначати ділянки в межах своєї території, а також у своїх територіальних водах, виключній економічній зоні та на континентальному шельфі, які надаватимуться для діяльності з пошуку, розвідки та видобутку природних ресурсів, а права, що передаватимуться в Угоді про обмежене партнерство, на яку посилається ця Угода, стосуються всього обсягу таких ділянок; і

БЕРУЧИ до уваги, що ця Угода не завдає шкоди правилам в Україні, що регулюють систему власності на майно, включаючи правила, пов'язані з державною власністю та приватизацією;

ОТЖЕ, ВНАСЛІДОК ЦЬОГО, Уряд України та Уряд Сполучених Штатів Америки (кожен окремо - «Сторона», а разом - «Сторони») укладають цю Угоду про створення Американсько-українського інвестиційного фонду відбудови («Угода»), як викладено тут.

Стаття I: Визначення

Кожний термін, написаний з великої літери в цій Угоді і не визначений у відповідній статті, має значення, викладене в Додатку A.

Стаття II: Сприяння створенню партнерства

1. Політика Сторін полягає в тому, щоб Корпорація Сполучених Штатів Америки з фінансування міжнародного розвитку («Партнер з обмеженою відповідальністю від США» або «Партнер від США»), агентство Сполучених Штатів Америки, підкріплене цілковитою довірою США, та Державна організація «Агенція з питань підтримки державно-приватного партнерства» («Партнер з обмеженою відповідальністю від України» або «Партнер від України»), агентство України, що представляє Україну, чиї зобов'язання підкріплені цілковитою довірою України (разом із Партнером від США, «Принципали» або «Партнери з обмеженою відповідальністю» або «Партнери»), уклали угоду, до якої час від часу можуть вноситися зміни відповідно до її положень («Угода про обмежене партнерство») для створення Американсько-українського інвестиційного фонду відбудови у формі обмеженого партнерства («Партнерство»).
2. Уряд України вживає всіх заходів, щоб сприяти своїм агенціям і установам у виконанні та реалізації цієї Угоди та Угоди про обмежене партнерство, у тому числі шляхом прийняття, підтримування та забезпечення виконання законодавства, яке може вимагатися для виконання та реалізації цієї Угоди та Угоди про обмежене партнерство, у тому числі з метою правової стабілізації. Уряд Сполучених Штатів Америки підтверджує, що він вжив необхідних заходів, щоб дозволити відповідним структурам США виконувати та реалізовувати цю Угоду та Угоду про обмежене партнерство.
3. Визнаючи той факт, що економічна діяльність, пов'язана з Партнерством, буде здійснюватися в Україні, Уряд України забезпечує, щоб, незважаючи на будь-які нові законодавчі акти України або зміни до законодавства України, які можуть бути прийняті в майбутньому, він продовжуватиме надавати Партнерству та його Партнерам з обмеженою відповідальністю не менш сприятливий режим, ніж той, що вимагається цією Угодою. З цією метою Уряд України забезпечує, щоб у разі будь-якої невідповідності між законодавством України та цією Угодою, ця Угода мала переважну силу щодо такої невідповідності. Крім того, Уряд України погоджується з тим, що він не може посилатися на положення свого внутрішнього законодавства як на виправдання будь-якого невиконання своїх зобов'язань за цією Угодою.

Стаття III: Мета Угоди

1. Метою цієї Угоди та політика Сторін є подальший розвиток економічного співробітництва між Сторонами, якому сприятиме Угода про обмежене партнерство.
2. Ця Угода зміцнює стратегічне партнерство між Сторонами для довгострокової відбудови та модернізації України у відповідь на великі руйнування, спричинені повномасштабним вторгненням Росії в Україну, та у прагненні до мирної, суверенної та стійкої України.
3. Сторони визнають, що відновлення України вимагає не лише фінансових інвестицій, а й структурних, інституційних та технологічних перетворень, узгоджених з демократичними цінностями, ринковими принципами та верховенством права.
4. Сторони також підтверджують, що ця Угода є вираженням ширшого, довгострокового стратегічного узгодження між їхніми народами та урядами, а також відчутною демонстрацією підтримки Сполученими Штатами Америки безпеки, процвітання й відбудови України та її інтегрування у глобальні економічні рамки.
5. Партнерство має на меті слугувати флагманським механізмом для заохочення прозорих, підзвітних та орієнтованих на майбутнє інвестицій у критично важливі сектори економіки України для підтримки стратегії відновлення України.

Стаття IV: Оподаткування і тарифи

1. Визнаючи той факт, що економічна діяльність, пов'язана з Партнерством, відбуватиметься в Україні, Уряд України вживає всіх необхідних заходів для забезпечення того, що будь-які доходи Партнерства (включаючи такі доходи, що виділяються Партнеру від США), будь-які внески та інші платежі Партнерству з боку Партнера від України, та будь-які інші платежі на користь Партнерства, пов'язані з доходами й прибутками Партнерства та іншими платежами, передбаченими Угодою про обмежене партнерство, а також усі виплати та інші платежі від Партнерства, у кожному конкретному випадку, не підлягають оподаткуванню, зборам, відрахуванням, утримуванням коштів (включаючи резервне утримання), нарахуванням, стягненням плати або іншим стягненням, накладеним будь-яким державним органом України.
2. Уряд Сполучених Штатів Америки підтверджує, що відповідно до розділів 871, 872, 881 і 882 Податкового кодексу США, федеральному податку США на доходи підлягає лише дохід іноземної особи з джерел у США або дохід, фактично пов'язаний з торгівлею чи бізнесом у США. Враховуючи, що Партнерство інвестуватиме в проекти в межах України, Уряд Сполучених Штатів Америки очікує, що Партнер від України не буде обкладатися федеральним податком США на доходи або утримуванню коштів (включаючи резервне утримання) щодо доходів, прибутків та виплат або інших платежів від Партнерства.
3. Уряд Сполучених Штатів Америки висловлює своє очікування, що він не буде вводити тарифи згідно з розділом 232 Закону про розширення торгівлі 1962 року або Закону про міжнародні надзвичайні економічні повноваження на будь-які предмети, отримані відповідно до ринкових прав на купівлю видобутку, які розглядаються в статті VIII цієї Угоди і більш повно викладені у відповідних положеннях Угоди про обмежене партнерство.

Стаття V. Конвертованість валюти та транскордонні перекази

1. Уряд України забезпечує вільну конвертацію гривні в долари та можливість переказу з будь-якого відповідного рахунку в Україні на такий рахунок (або рахунки) Партнерства, відкриті в Україні або за її межами, куди Генеральний партнер або інша уповноважена сторона, що діє від імені Партнерства, може час від часу направляти, в кожному випадку без оплати, без умов і без затримок (i) будь-які платежі на користь Партнерства, що очікуються в доларах, пов'язані з доходами, прибутками та іншими платежами Партнерства, передбаченими Угодою про обмежене партнерство; (ii) будь-які розподільчі виплати, що очікуються в доларах відповідно до Угоди про обмежене партнерство; та (iii) будь-які виплати гонорарів та витрат Генеральному партнеру або від Генерального партнера у доларах відповідно до Угоди про обмежене партнерство.
2. Сторони беруть до уваги зобов'язання в Угоді про обмежене партнерство сумлінно проводити консультації стосовно будь-яких винятків та обмежень щодо механізму конвертації та переказів, описаного в першому реченні частини 1 статті V, які можуть бути запропоновані Урядом України на підставі угод, зобов'язань або договорів між суверенними державами та/або міжнародними фінансовими установами, які Україна зобов'язана виконувати, а також з міркувань макроекономічної та фінансової стабільності. У разі погіршення стану платіжного балансу або суттєвого скорочення рівня золотовалютних резервів та запасів іноземної валюти, що загрожує макроекономічній та фінансовій стабільності України, Уряд України, після консультацій з Міністерством фінансів Сполучених Штатів Америки, може вжити розумних захисних заходів у вигляді обмежень на конвертацію гривні в долари та переказ коштів з будь-якого відповідного рахунку в Україні на рахунок чи рахунки Партнерства, відкриті на території або за межами України, та повідомлятиме, наскільки це можливо, про часові рамки скасування таких заходів. У разі встановлення Урядом України оплати, умов або створення затримок щодо таких платежів, у будь-який час та з будь-якої причини, Уряд України зобов'язується відшкодувати витрати та звільнити Партнерство (а також Партнера з обмеженою відповідальністю від США та Генерального партнера, залежно від обставин) від усіх спричинених цим витрат та збитків.
3. На період дії воєнного стану в Україні та протягом 3 (трьох) місяців після його скасування або припинення Сторони погоджуються, що конвертація гривні в долари та переказ коштів з будь-якого відповідного рахунку в Україні на рахунок чи рахунки Партнерства, відкриті на території або за межами України, здійснюються в межах, визначених відповідно до Угоди про обмежене партнерство.
4. Місцезнаходження банківських рахунків Партнерства буде визначено в Угоді про обмежене партнерство.

Стаття VI: Внески у Партнерство

1. Кожна Сторона планує робити внески у Партнерство відповідно до умов Угоди про обмежене партнерство.
2. В обмін на початкову видачу партнерських часток у Партнерстві Партнеру від України Уряд України забезпечує, щоб внесок Партнера від України у Партнерство був зроблений у Дату набуття чинності у формі безвідкличного права на отримання Узгодженого з Україною Доходу.
3. Уряд України забезпечує, протягом терміну дії Партнерства, що Узгоджений з Україною Дохід буде перераховуватися Партнеру від України, а Партнер від України перераховує Партнерству Узгоджений з Україною Дохід на виконання Угоди про обмежене партнерство.
4. На виконання частини 3 статті VI Уряд України забезпечує перерахування від усіх джерел Узгодженого з Україною Доходу до спеціального фонду державного бюджету. Відповідно до законодавства цей Узгоджений з Україною Дохід перераховується зі спеціального фонду державного бюджету Партнеру від України, а потім ці кошти перераховуються Партнерству від Партнера від України на виконання Угоди про обмежене партнерство.
5. Якщо після Дати набуття чинності Уряд Сполучених Штатів Америки надаватиме Уряду України нову військову допомогу в будь-якій формі (включаючи передачу систем озброєнь, боєприпасів, технологій або навчання), капітальний внесок Партнера від США вважатиметься збільшеним на оціночну вартість такої військової допомоги, відповідно до Угоди про обмежене партнерство.

Стаття VII: Права на інвестиційні можливості

1. (a) Кожний державний орган України, що уповноважений видавати ліцензію або спеціальний дозвіл на користування надрами для будь-яких активів, що стосуються природних ресурсів, повинен включити до такої ліцензії або спеціального дозволу, а також до пов'язаної з ними угоди про умови користування надрами або угоди про розподіл продукції з надрокористувачами положення, яке вимагає, щоб одержувач цього дозволу, завжди, коли він прагне залучити капітал, надавав відповідну інвестиційну інформацію Партнерству відповідно до Угоди про обмежене партнерство..
  (b) Кожен Орган державної влади України, уповноважений затверджувати договір про державно-приватне партнерство, концесію чи іншу угоду щодо будівництва або експлуатації значних об'єктів інфраструктури (як визначено в Угоді про обмежене партнерство), повинен включити до будь-якого такого договору, концесії чи іншої угоди положення, яке вимагає від одержувача у будь-який час, коли він прагне залучити капітал, надавати Партнерству відповідну інвестиційну інформацію відповідно до Угоди про обмежене партнерство.
  (c) Вимоги щодо надання відповідної інвестиційної інформації Партнерству, як зазначено тут в пунктах (a) та (b), повинні виконуватися відповідно до чинного законодавства та Зобов'язань України перед ЄС. Якщо після підписання цієї Угоди Україні необхідно буде взяти на себе додаткові зобов'язання, пов'язані з набуттям нею членства в Європейському Союзі, які можуть вплинути на це положення, Сторони повинні провести сумлінні консультації та переговори з метою прийняття відповідних поправок.
  (d) Крім того, коли Партнерство висловить офіційну зацікавленість в участі в проекті такого типу, як описано тут в пунктах (a) або (b), відповідна ліцензія, спеціальний дозвіл, уповноваження, угода про умови користування надрами, угода про розподіл продукції або угода щодо активів, які мають відношення до інфраструктури, вимагатимуть від одержувача (i) провести добросовісні переговори з Партнерством відповідно до процедур, викладених в Угоді про обмежене партнерство, та (ii) утримуватися від надання будь-якій третій стороні значно більш вигідних фінансових або економічних умов для інвестиційної можливості, практично подібної до тої, що пропонується Партнерству.
2. Детальні процедури та умови прав на інвестиційні можливості, описані тут у статті VII, повинні бути викладені в Угоді про обмежене партнерство та впроваджуватися відповідно до чинного законодавства та зобов'язань України перед ЄС.

Стаття VIII: Ринкові права на купівлю видобутку

1. Кожен Державний орган України, що уповноважений видавати ліцензію або спеціальний дозвіл на користування надрами для будь-яких активів, що стосуються природних ресурсів, включає до умов такої ліцензії або спеціального дозволу та до пов'язаної з ними угоди про умови користування надрами або до угоди про розподіл продукції з надрокористувачами: (i) положення, що дозволяє Партнеру від США (або його уповноваженій особі) вести переговори, відповідно до умов Угоди про обмежене партнерство, про права на купівлю видобутку на ринкових комерційних умовах протягом строку дії такої ліцензії або спеціального дозволу; та (ii) вимогу до одержувача протягом деякого періоду часу та на умовах, які будуть визначені в Угоді про обмежене партнерство, утримуватися від пропозиції будь-якій третій стороні значно вигідніших фінансових або економічних умов для купівлі видобувної продукції, суттєво подібної за якістю чи кількістю.
2. Визнаючи спільну зацікавленість у забезпеченні того, щоб ця Угода та Угода про обмежене партнерство відповідали стратегічним інтересам обох Сторін, Уряд України зобов'яже кожен Державний орган України, що уповноважений видавати ліцензії або спеціальні дозволи на користування надрами для будь-яких активів, що стосуються природних ресурсів, включати до умов таких ліцензій або спеціальних дозволів певні обмеження щодо укладення угод про закупівлю продукції з контрагентами, на умовах, які будуть визначені в Угоді про обмежене партнерство.
3. Детальні процедури та умови таких прав на купівлю видобувної продукції мають бути викладені в Угоді про обмежене партнерство та імплементовані відповідно до чинного законодавства та зобов'язань України перед ЄС. Якщо після підписання цієї Угоди Україні необхідно буде взяти на себе додаткові зобов'язання, пов'язані з набуттям нею членства в Європейському Союзі, які можуть вплинути на це положення, Сторони мають провести сумлінні консультації та переговори з метою прийняття відповідних поправок.

Стаття IX: Вирішення спорів

1. Сторони докладають зусиль для досягнення згоди щодо тлумачення та застосування цієї Угоди та усіх можливих зусиль шляхом співробітництва та консультацій для досягнення взаємно задовільного вирішення будь-якого питання, яке може вплинути на функціонування цієї Угоди.
2. У разі виникнення спору щодо тлумачення або застосування цієї Угоди, такий спір вирішується шляхом взаємних консультацій.

Стаття X: Внесення змін

1. Ця Угода може бути змінений за письмовою згодою Сторін.
2. Якщо поправку погоджено та затверджено відповідно до правових вимог кожної Сторони, така поправка є невід'ємною частиною цієї Угоди та набирає чинності з дати, про яку Сторони можуть домовитися.

Стаття XI: Набрання чинності та припинення дії

1. Ця Угода набирає чинності з дати більш пізньої ноти при обміні нотами між Сторонами про те, що кожна Сторона завершила свої внутрішні процедури для набрання чинності.
2. У контексті частини 1 статті XI Сторони визнають, що набрання чинності цією Угодою вимагає ратифікації цієї Угоди Верховною Радою України.
3. Ця Угода залишається чинною до того моменту, поки Сторони не погодяться про її припинення.

Вчинено у Вашингтоні, округ Колумбія, 30 квітня 2025 року українською та англійською мовами, при цьому обидва тексти однаково автентичні.

Від Уряду Сполучених Штатів Америки:

Скотт К. Г. Бессент

Міністр фінансів США

Від Уряду України:

Юлія Свириденко

Перший віце-прем'єр-міністр України – Міністр економіки України

Додаток A: Визначення

"Долари" означають законну валюту Сполучених Штатів Америки.

«Дата набуття чинності» означає дату набуття чинності цієї Угоди або дату набуття чинності Угоди про обмежене партнерство, залежно від того, яка з них є пізнішою.

«Державний орган України» означає будь-яку українську національну, місцеву, муніципальну або іншу політичну структуру або її підрозділ, а також будь-який український державний орган або орган, який здійснює виконавчі, законодавчі, судові, регулятивні, адміністративні або податкові функції уряду або стосовні уряду, включаючи будь-який суд.

«Гривня» означає законну валюту України.

"Активи, що стосуються природних ресурсів" означає ділянки, запаси та родовища на території України алюмінію, сурми, миш'яку, бариту, берилію, вісмуту, церію, цезію, хрому, кобальту, міді, диспрозію, ербію, європію, фтору, плавикового шпату, гадолінію, галію, германію, золота, графіту, гафнію, гольмію, індію, іридію, лантану, літію, лютецію, магнію, марганцю, неодиму, нікелю, ніобію, паладію, платини, калію, празеодиму, родію, рубідію, рутенію, самарію, скандію, танталу, телуру, тербію, тулію, олова, титану, вольфраму, урану, ванадію, ітербію, ітрію, цинку, цирконію, нафти, природний газу (включаючи скраплений природний газ) та інші мінерали або вуглеводні, іншим чином погоджені Принципалами.

«Узгоджений з Україною Дохід» означає 50% усіх роялті (орендних платежів), ліцензійних платежів та сум, що підлягають сплаті за угодами про розподіл продукції, отриманих будь-яким державним органом України від або у зв'язку з: (i) видачею нових ліцензій або спеціальних дозволів на дату набуття чинності Угоди про обмежене партнерство будь-яким державним органом України щодо розвідки, виробництва, видобутку, розробки, добування, експлуатації, переробки, очистки або іншого використання Активів, що стосуються природних ресурсів (за умови, що будь-які поновлення або продовження ліцензій або спеціальних дозволів, які були видані до дати набуття чинності Угодою про обмежене партнерство сюди не входять, якщо це не передбачено у пункті (ii) нижче, або (ii) експлуатація ліцензій чи спеціальних дозволів на розвідку, виробництво, видобуток, розробку, добування, експлуатацію, переробку, очистку або інше використання Активів, що стосуються природних ресурсів, якщо ці ліцензії або спеціальні дозволи були видані до дати набуття чинності Угодою про обмежене партнерство, але вони ще не експлуатувалися в промислових цілях станом на цю дату набуття чинності; однак, за жодних обставин Узгоджений з Україною Дохід не включатиме: (x) будь-які доходи, отримані від Партнерства у формі виплат або іншим чином, та (y) отримані від Росії або її уповноважених осіб як репарації за вторгнення Росії в Україну.

"Зобов'язання України перед ЄС" означають існуючі міжнародні зобов'язання України перед Європейським Союзом (ЄС), що діють на момент підписання цієї Угоди, пов'язані зі набуттям Україною членства в Європейському Союзі, включаючи ті зобов'язання, які містяться в Угоді про асоціацію між Європейським Союзом і Європейським співтовариством з атомної енергії та їх державами-членами, з однієї сторони, та Україною, з іншої сторони, вчинених у Брюсселі 21 березня та 27 червня 2014 року.
Agreement between the Government of Ukraine and the Government of the United States of America on the Establishment of a United States-Ukraine Reconstruction Investment Fund

WHEREAS, the United States of America has provided significant financial and material support to Ukraine since Russia's full-scale invasion of Ukraine in February 2022;

WHEREAS, the American people desire to invest alongside Ukraine in a free, sovereign, and secure Ukraine;

WHEREAS, the United States of America and Ukraine desire a lasting peace in Ukraine and a durable partnership between their two peoples and governments;

WHEREAS, the United States of America and Ukraine recognize the contribution that Ukraine has made to strengthening international peace and security by voluntarily relinquishing the world's third largest arsenal of nuclear weapons;

WHEREAS, the United States of America and Ukraine wish to ensure that those States and other persons that have acted adversely to Ukraine in the conflict do not benefit from the reconstruction of Ukraine following a lasting peace;

WHEREAS, the United States of America and Ukraine seek to create the conditions necessary to, among other objectives, increase investment in mining, energy, and related technology in Ukraine by third parties including, but not limited to, international investors based in the United States of America, the European Union, and other States supporting Ukraine's defense against Russia's full-scale invasion;

WHEREAS, the United States of America acknowledges Ukraine's intention to avoid conflicts in the drafting of this Agreement with Ukraine's obligations related to European Union accession or agreements with international financial institutions or other official creditors;

WHEREAS, Ukraine has, in accordance with international law, sovereignty over its natural resources located in its territory as well as in its territorial waters, in addition to sovereign rights in its exclusive economic zone and continental shelf, which allow for Ukraine to conclude this Agreement and fulfill the aims of this Agreement;

WHEREAS, Ukraine retains the right to determine the areas within its territory as well as in its territorial waters, exclusive economic zone, and continental shelf to be made available for the exercise of the activities of prospecting, exploring for, and producing natural resources, and the rights to be conveyed in the LP Agreement referenced herein are applicable to the entirety of such areas; and

WHEREAS, this Agreement does not prejudice the rules in Ukraine governing the system of property ownership, including rules related to state-owned property and privatization.

NOW, THEREFORE, the Government of Ukraine and the Government of the United States of America (each a "Party" and together the "Parties") hereby enter into this Agreement on the Establishment of a United States-Ukraine Reconstruction Investment Fund ("Agreement"), as set forth herein.

Article I: Definitions

Each capitalized term used in this Agreement that is not defined in the relevant Article has the meaning set forth in Appendix A.

Article II: Enabling the Establishment of a Partnership

1. It is the policy of the Parties to have the United States International Development Finance Corporation (the "U.S. Limited Partner" or the "U.S. Partner"), an agency of the United States of America backed by the full faith and credit of the United States, and the State Organization "Agency on Support Public-Private Partnership" (the "Ukraine Limited Partner" or the "Ukraine Partner"), an agency of Ukraine representing Ukraine whose obligations are backed by the full faith and credit of Ukraine (together with the U.S. Partner, the "Principals" or the "Limited Partners" or the "Partners"), conclude an agreement, which may be amended from time to time in accordance with its terms (the "LP Agreement") to establish the United States-Ukraine Reconstruction Investment Fund in the form of a limited partnership (the "Partnership").
2. The Government of Ukraine shall take all steps to empower its agencies and instrumentalities to execute and implement this Agreement and the LP Agreement, including by adopting, maintaining, and enforcing legislation as may be required to execute and implement this Agreement and the LP Agreement, including for the purposes of legal stabilization. The Government of the United States of America affirms that it has put in place the necessary measures to allow the relevant United States parties to execute and implement this Agreement and the LP Agreement.
3. In recognition of the fact that the economic activity related to the Partnership will take place in Ukraine, the Government of Ukraine shall ensure that, notwithstanding any new legislation of Ukraine or amendments to legislation of Ukraine that may be adopted in the future, it shall continue to accord to the Partnership and its Limited Partners treatment no less favorable than that required by this Agreement. To that end, the Government of Ukraine shall ensure that in case of any inconsistency between legislation of Ukraine and this Agreement, this Agreement shall prevail to the extent of the inconsistency. Further, the Government of Ukraine agrees that it may not invoke the provisions of its internal law as justification for any failure to perform its obligations under this Agreement.

Article III: Objective of the Agreement

1. It is the objective of this Agreement and the policy of the Parties to further economic cooperation between the Parties, which will be facilitated by the LP Agreement.
2. This Agreement strengthens the strategic partnership between the Parties for the long-term reconstruction and modernization of Ukraine, in response to the large-scale destruction caused by Russia's full-scale invasion of Ukraine and in pursuit of a peaceful, sovereign, and resilient Ukraine.
3. The Parties acknowledge that Ukraine's recovery requires not only financial investment but also structural, institutional, and technological transformation, aligned with democratic values, market principles, and the rule of law.
4. The Parties further affirm that this Agreement is an expression of a broader, long-term strategic alignment between their peoples and governments, and a tangible demonstration of the United States of America's support for Ukraine's security, prosperity, reconstruction, and integration into global economic frameworks.
5. The Partnership is intended to serve as a flagship mechanism for encouraging transparent, accountable, and future-oriented investment into critical sectors of Ukraine's economy to support Ukraine's recovery strategy.

Article IV: Taxation and Tariffs

1. In recognition of the fact that the economic activity related to the Partnership will take place in Ukraine, the Government of Ukraine shall take all actions necessary to ensure that any and all income of the Partnership (including any such income allocable to the U.S. Partner), any and all contributions and other payments to the Partnership from the Ukraine Partner, any and all other payments to the Partnership relating to the Partnership's revenues, earnings, and other payments contemplated under the LP Agreement, and all distributions and other payments from the Partnership, in each case, shall not be subject to taxes, levies, imposts, duties, deductions, withholdings (including backup withholding), assessments, fees, or other charges imposed by any Governmental Authority of Ukraine.
2. The Government of the United States of America affirms that under United States Internal Revenue Code Sections 871, 872, 881, and 882, only income of a foreign person from United States sources or income effectively connected to a United States trade or business is subject to United States federal income tax. Given that the Partnership will invest in projects within Ukraine, the Government of the United States of America expects that the Ukraine Partner will not be subject to United States federal income tax or withholdings (including backup withholding) with respect to the Partnership's revenue, earnings, and distributions or other payments from the Partnership.
3. The Government of the United States of America expresses its expectation that it would not impose tariffs pursuant to Section 232 of the Trade Expansion Act of 1962 or the International Emergency Economic Powers Act on any articles obtained pursuant to the market-based offtake rights addressed in Article VIII of this Agreement and set forth more fully in relevant provisions of the LP Agreement.

Article V: Currency Convertibility and Cross-Border Transfers

1. The Government of Ukraine shall ensure the free convertibility of Hryvnia into Dollars and transferability from any relevant account in Ukraine and into such account(s) of the Partnership established inside or outside of Ukraine as the General Partner or any other authorized party acting on behalf of the Partnership may from time to time direct, in each case without cost, condition, or delay, with respect to (i) any and all payments to the Partnership requested in Dollars relating to the Partnership's revenues, earnings, and other payments contemplated under the LP Agreement; (ii) payment of any distributions requested in Dollars under the LP Agreement; and (iii) any payment of fees and expenses to the General Partner or by the General Partner requested in Dollars under the LP Agreement.
2. The Parties take note of the commitment in the LP Agreement to consult in good faith on any exceptions and limitations to the convertibility and transferability arrangement described in the first sentence of Section 1 of this Article V, which may be proposed by the Government of Ukraine in recognition of any agreements, obligations, or treaties between or among sovereign nations and/or international financial institutions under which Ukraine is bound, obligated, or otherwise required to perform, as well as considerations of macroeconomic and financial stability. In the event of a deterioration in the balance of payments or a significant reduction in the level of gold and foreign exchange reserves that threatens Ukraine's macroeconomic and financial stability, the Government of Ukraine, after consulting with the United States Department of the Treasury, may take reasonable protective measures in the form of restrictions on the conversion of Hryvnia into Dollars and the transfer of funds from any relevant account in Ukraine to such account(s) of the Partnership opened inside or outside of Ukraine and will provide, to the extent possible, a time frame for the lifting of such measures. If any costs, conditions, or delays are imposed by the Government of Ukraine at any time and for any reason with respect to such payments, the Government of Ukraine shall indemnify and hold harmless the Partnership (and the U.S. Limited Partner and the General Partner, as applicable) for all losses, costs, and expenses arising therefrom.
3. During the period of martial law in Ukraine and for three (3) months after its cancellation or termination, the Parties agree that the conversion of Hryvnia into Dollars and the transfer of funds from any relevant account in Ukraine to such account(s) of the Partnership opened inside or outside of Ukraine shall be carried out within the limits determined in accordance with the LP Agreement.
4. The location of the bank accounts of the Partnership will be as determined in the LP Agreement.

Article VI: Contributions to the Partnership

1. Each Party plans to make contributions to the Partnership in accordance with the terms of the LP Agreement.
2. In exchange for the initial issuance of partnership interests in the Partnership to the Ukraine Partner, the Government of Ukraine shall ensure that the contribution to the Partnership of the Ukraine Partner is made on the Effective Date in the form of an irrevocable right to receive the Ukraine Agreed Revenue.
3. The Government of Ukraine shall ensure during the term of the Partnership that the Ukraine Agreed Revenue will be remitted to the Ukraine Partner, and that the Ukraine Partner shall remit the Ukraine Agreed Revenue to the Partnership to implement the LP Agreement.
4. In furtherance of Section 3 of this Article VI, the Government of Ukraine shall ensure that all sources of Ukraine Agreed Revenue are remitted to a special fund of the state budget. By operation of law, such Ukraine Agreed Revenue shall be remitted from the special fund of the state budget to the Ukraine Partner, and thereafter be remitted from the Ukraine Partner to the Partnership to implement the LP Agreement.
5. If, after the Effective Date, the Government of the United States of America delivers new military assistance to the Government of Ukraine in any form (including the donation of weapons systems, ammunition, technology or training), the capital contribution of the U.S. Partner will be deemed to be increased by the assessed value of such military assistance, in accordance with the LP Agreement.

Article VII: Investment Opportunity Rights

1. (a) Each Governmental Authority of Ukraine that is authorized to issue a license or special permit for subsoil use for any Natural Resource Relevant Assets shall include in such license or special permit, and in the related agreement on subsoil use conditions or production sharing agreement with subsoil users, a provision requiring the recipient thereof, at any time it is seeking to raise capital, to make relevant investment information available to the Partnership in accordance with the LP Agreement.
  (b) Each Governmental Authority of Ukraine that is authorized to approve a public-private partnership contract, a concession, or other agreement to construct or operate significant infrastructure relevant assets (as defined in the LP Agreement) shall include in any such contract, concession or other agreement, a provision requiring the recipient thereof, at any time it is seeking to raise capital, to make relevant investment information available to the Partnership in accordance with the LP Agreement.
  (c) The requirements to make relevant investment information available to the Partnership as set forth in subsections (a) and (b) of this Section 1 are to be carried out in accordance with applicable law and the Ukraine EU Obligations. If, after the signing of this Agreement, Ukraine needs to assume additional obligations related to its European Union accession that could impact this provision, the Parties shall consult and negotiate in good faith to adopt adjustments, as appropriate.
  (d) Furthermore, when the Partnership expresses formal interest in participating in a project of the kind described in subsection (a) or (b) of this Section 1, the relevant license, special permit, authorization, agreement on subsoil use conditions, production sharing agreement, or agreement with respect to infrastructure relevant assets shall require the recipient thereof to (i) engage in good faith negotiations with the Partnership in accordance with the procedures set out in the LP Agreement, and (ii) refrain from granting to any third party materially more favorable financial or economic terms for a substantially similar investment opportunity as that offered to the Partnership.
2. The detailed procedures and conditions for the investment opportunity rights described in this Article VII shall be set forth in the LP Agreement and implemented in accordance with applicable law and the Ukraine EU Obligations.

Article VIII: Market-Based Offtake Rights

1. Each Governmental Authority of Ukraine that is authorized to issue a license or special permit for subsoil use for any Natural Resource Relevant Assets shall include in the terms of such license or special permit and in the related agreement on subsoil use conditions or in a production sharing agreement with subsoil users: (i) a provision allowing the U.S. Partner (or its designee or assignee) to negotiate for, in accordance with the terms of the LP Agreement, offtake rights on market-based commercial terms during the term of such license or special permit; and (ii) a requirement for the recipient to, for a period of time and on conditions to be specified in the LP Agreement, refrain from offering to any third party materially more favorable financial or economic terms for offtake of a substantially similar quality or quantity of product.
2. In recognition of the shared interest in ensuring that this Agreement and the LP Agreement are consistent with the strategic interests of both Parties, the Government of Ukraine shall cause each Governmental Authority of Ukraine that is authorized to issue licenses or special permits for subsoil use for any Natural Resource Relevant Assets to include in the terms of such licenses or special permits certain restrictions on entry into offtake arrangements with counterparties, on terms to be specified in the LP Agreement.
3. The detailed procedures and conditions for such offtake rights are to be set forth in the LP Agreement and implemented in accordance with applicable law and the Ukraine EU Obligations. If, after the signing of this Agreement, Ukraine needs to assume additional obligations related to its European Union accession that could impact this provision, the Parties shall consult and negotiate in good faith to adopt adjustments, as appropriate.

Article IX: Dispute Settlement

1. The Parties shall endeavor to agree on the interpretation and application of this Agreement and shall make every attempt through cooperation and consultations to arrive at a mutually satisfactory resolution of any matter that might affect its operation.
2. To the extent that a dispute arises regarding the interpretation or application of this Agreement, such dispute shall be resolved by mutual consultation.

Article X: Amendment

1. This Agreement may be amended by written agreement of the Parties.
2. When so agreed and approved in accordance with the legal requirements of each Party, an amendment shall constitute an integral part of this Agreement and shall enter into force on such date as the Parties may agree.

Article XI: Entry into Force and Termination

1. This Agreement shall enter into force on the date of the later note in an exchange of notes between the Parties indicating that each Party has completed its internal procedures for entry into force.
2. In the context of Article XI, Section 1, the Parties acknowledge that entry into force of this Agreement requires the ratification of this Agreement by the Verkhovna Rada of Ukraine.
3. This Agreement shall remain in force until such time as the Parties agree to its termination.

Done at Washington, DC, on this 30th day of April, 2025 in the English and Ukrainian languages, both texts being equally authentic.

For the Government of the United States of America:

Scott K. H. Bessent

Secretary of the Treasury

For the Government of Ukraine:

Yuliia Svyrydenko

First Deputy Prime Minister of Ukraine – Minister of Economy

Appendix A: Definitions

"Dollars" means the lawful currency of the United States of America.

"Effective Date" means either the date on which this Agreement enters into force or the date on which the LP Agreement becomes effective, whichever is later.

"Governmental Authority of Ukraine" means any Ukrainian national, local, municipal or other political instrumentality or subdivision thereof and any Ukrainian governmental entity or body exercising executive, legislative, judicial, regulatory, administrative or taxing functions of or pertaining to government, including any court.

"Hryvnia" means the lawful currency of Ukraine.

"Natural Resource Relevant Assets" means the sites, reserves, and deposits in the territory of Ukraine of aluminum, antimony, arsenic, barite, beryllium, bismuth, cerium, cesium, chromium, cobalt, copper, dysprosium, erbium, europium, fluorine, fluorspar, gadolinium, gallium, germanium, gold, graphite, hafnium, holmium, indium, iridium, lanthanum, lithium, lutetium, magnesium, manganese, neodymium, nickel, niobium, palladium, platinum, potash, praseodymium, rhodium, rubidium, ruthenium, samarium, scandium, tantalum, tellurium, terbium, thulium, tin, titanium, tungsten, uranium, vanadium, ytterbium, yttrium, zinc, zirconium, oil, natural gas (including liquified natural gas), and other minerals or hydrocarbons otherwise agreed by the Principals.

"Ukraine Agreed Revenue" means 50% of all royalties (rent payments), license fees, and amounts payable under production sharing agreements received by any Governmental Authority of Ukraine from or relating to: (i) the issuance of new licenses or special permits on or after the effective date of the LP Agreement by any Governmental Authority of Ukraine with respect to the exploration, production, mining, development, extraction, exploitation, processing, refining or other use of Natural Resource Relevant Assets (provided that, unless included pursuant to clause (ii) below, any renewals or extensions of any licenses or special permits that were issued prior to the effective date of the LP Agreement will be excluded), or (ii) the exploitation of licenses or special permits with respect to the exploration, production, mining, development, extraction, exploitation, processing, refining or other use of Natural Resource Relevant Assets, which licenses or special permits were issued prior to the effective date of the LP Agreement but were not industrially exploited as of such effective date; provided, however, that in no event shall Ukrainian Agreed Revenue include any revenues (x) received from the Partnership, in the form of distributions or otherwise, or (y) received from Russia or its designees as reparations for the invasion of Ukraine by Russia.

"Ukraine EU Obligations" means existing international obligations of Ukraine to the European Union (EU) in force as of the signing of this Agreement related to Ukraine's accession to the European Union, including those obligations contained in the Association Agreement between the European Union and the European Atomic Energy Community and their Member States, of the one part, and Ukraine, of the other part, done in Brussels on 21 March and 27 June 2014.

== See also ==
- 2025 Trump–Zelenskyy Oval Office meeting – Meeting between the presidents of Ukraine and the U.S. on February 28, 2025
- Economy of Ukraine
- Ukraine–United States relations

== Wikisource ==
- Works related to Bilateral agreement establishing terms and conditions for a Reconstruction Investment Fund at Wikisource
