= Sword Gate House =

Historic house in South Carolina, United States

- U.S. National Register of Historic Places
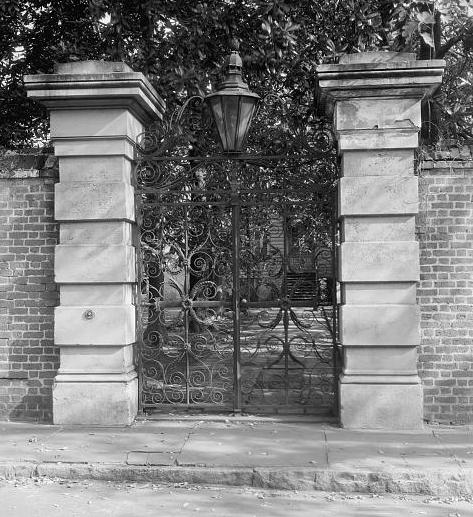

- Location within South Carolina Location within the United States
- Location: 32 Legare St., Charleston, South Carolina
- Coordinates: 32°46′25″N 79°56′3″W
- NRHP reference No.: 70000579
- Added to NRHP: December 18, 1970

The Sword Gate House is a historic house in Charleston, South Carolina. Built in stages, the main portion of the house is believed to have been built around 1803, possibly by French Huguenots James LaRoche and J. Lardent. The house replaced a simpler house that was shown on a plat in 1803.

== History ==
=== 19th century ===
After being constructed on the site of a demolished house in 1803, possibly by French Huguenots, British consul George Hopley bought and redecorated the house in 1849, the same year the Sword Gates were installed in the high brick wall on Legare Street. Each half has a central cross formed by point of two vertical spears meeting in center of horizontally placed broadsword, giving the house its popular name. The gates were manufactured by Christopher Werner of Charleston. The City of Charleston had hired Werner to produce a "pair" of gates for the new police station, and Werner made what he understood that to mean: two matching sets of gates—two left panels and two right panels. The city had intended only one set of gates - that is, a single left and single right panel. Werner sold the duplicate set to George Hopley who had them installed at his house. (The matching set of gates is now installed at the main entrance of The Citadel near Hampton Park.)

The house has seen many late 19th century additions and alterations. By 1970 the brick wing was separated from the house and given the address of 109 Tradd Street, but it retained its architectural integrity. It is believed to have been added ca. 1818; acquired by Andre Talvande and his mother, Madame Talvande, in 1819; and used as a girls school. It was during their ownership that the high masonry walls surrounding the property were added.

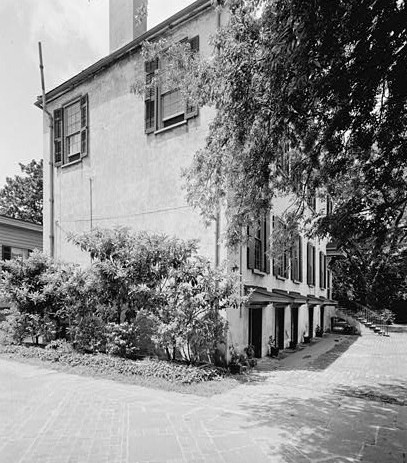
Brick wing at 109 Tradd Street

The building is two and a half stories over a high basement, with a slate-covered hip roof. There are three pedimented dormers along the north and one on the west. The brick walls are covered with stucco; the cornice is also stucco. First floor windows have exterior paneled shutters and second story shutters are louvered.

=== 20th century ===
The Gaud family bought the Sword Gate House in 1949 following almost two decades of vacancy and repaired and furnished the buildings. They operated a guest house in the house for a time. Eventually, by 1959, they chose to pursue a subdivision of the property and sell off two lots facing on Legare Street to make ends meet. The plan was met with strong neighborhood opposition, but a city zoning board eventually approved the subdivision in late 1959.

Mrs. H.C. Shackelford bought most of the property from Mr. Henry T. Gaud for $47,500 in 1960. George E. Roosevelt bought house in 1963 from Mrs. H.C. Shackelford and reversed the multiple subdivisions of the parcel that had taken place.

The house was listed in the National Register December 18, 1970.

=== 21st century ===
In 2002, the house underwent an extensive restoration. The work reassembled three lots that had been subdivided into a single parcel and converted the entire structure back into a single-family house.

It was placed for sale in April 2009 for $23 million, but the asking price dropped over time. The house became the most expensive house in Charleston when it sold for $10 million in June 2020, replacing the Col. John Ashe House although the highest price paid for a residence (but not a house) was set when the penthouse of the People's Office Building sold for $12 million in March 2020.

== See also ==
- List of National Historic Landmarks in South Carolina
- National Register of Historic Places listings in Charleston, South Carolina

Preceded by Col. John Ashe House	Most Expensive House in Charleston, South Carolina; June 2020–November 2020	Succeeded by Rev. Paul Trapier Gervais House
