= Rev. Paul Trapier Gervais House =

19th century house in South Carolina, US

Coordinates: 32.773289°N 79.934237°W

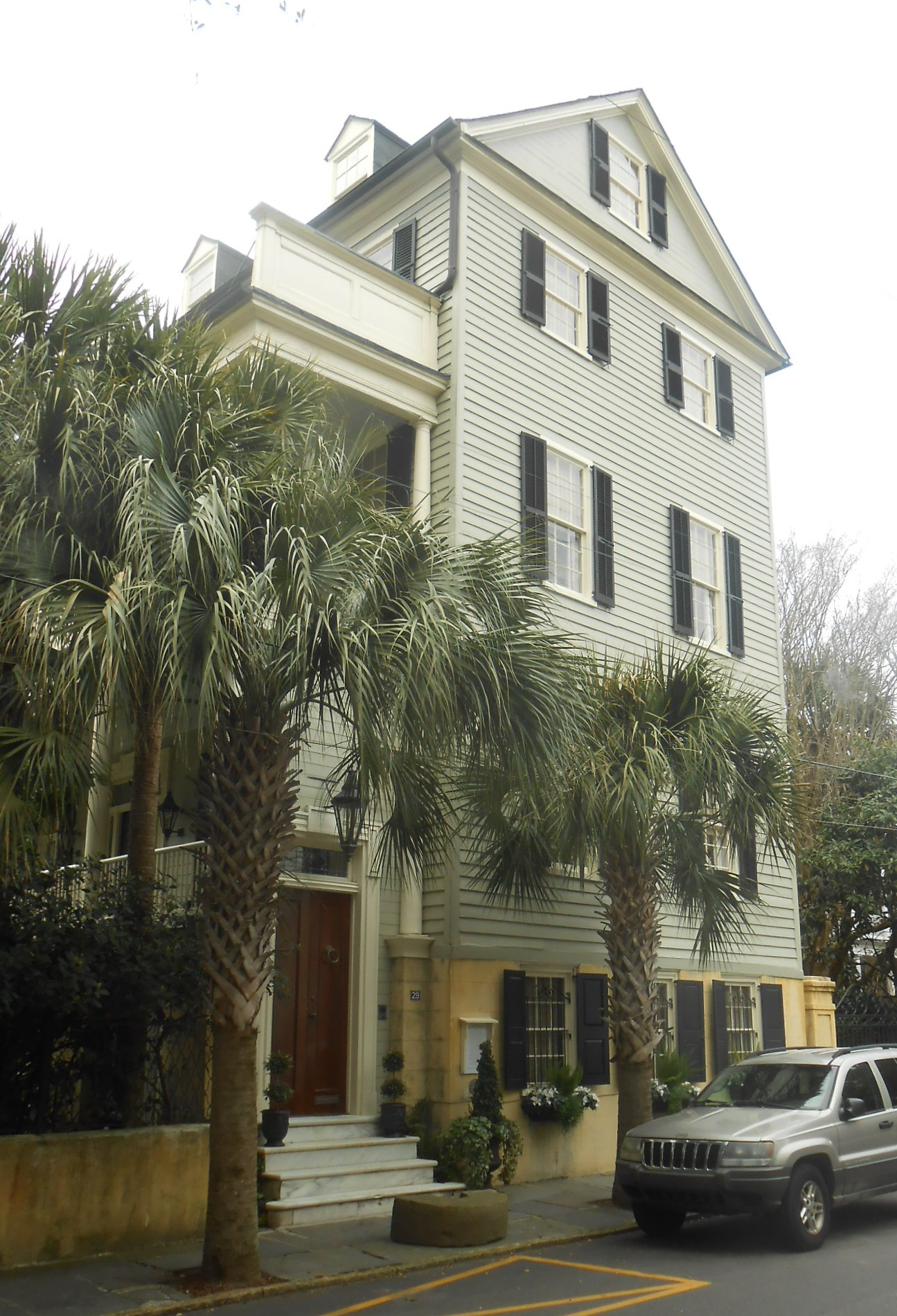
The Rev. Gervais House at 29 Legare St. is a particularly large example of the Charleston single house.

The Rev. Paul Trapier Gervais House is a large, Greek Revival Charleston single house at 29 Legare Street in Charleston, South Carolina.

== History ==
The land was owned in the early 19th century by Isaac Parker whose estate sold it in 1835 to Rev. Paul Trapier Gervais. Rev. Gervais paid $5000 for the lot that was 105' on Legare Street and 280' deep. Rev. Gervais had been ordained in 1807 in New York, but in 1810, he relocated to rural Johns Island, a sea island south of Charleston, South Carolina. Johns Island had not had an Episcopal rector for twenty years and had no church; Rev. Gervais organized the congregation, and St. John's Protestant Episcopal Church opened in 1817.

Writer Josephine Pinckney, one of the most prominent leaders of the Charleston Renaissance, was born in the house on January 25, 1895, to her parents Thomas Pinckney and Camilla Scott-Pinckney.

Gaud School for Boys--which merged with another school to form Porter-Gaud School--was formed at this house with classes held in a brick dependency in the rear. The school, which opened on October 1, 1908, was originally known as the Charleston School and operated at the house as both a boarding and day school for boys.

In November 2020, the house sold for $11,000,000 and became the most expensive house sold in Charleston; it held that record less than a year when another house on the same street, 10 Legare Street, sold for more.

| Preceded by Sword Gate House | Most Expensive House in Charleston, South Carolina; November 2020 - July 2021 | Succeeded by 10 Legare Street |
