= William Gibbes House =

Historic house in South Carolina, United States

- U.S. National Register of Historic Places
- U.S. National Historic Landmark
- U.S. National Historic Landmark District – Contributing property
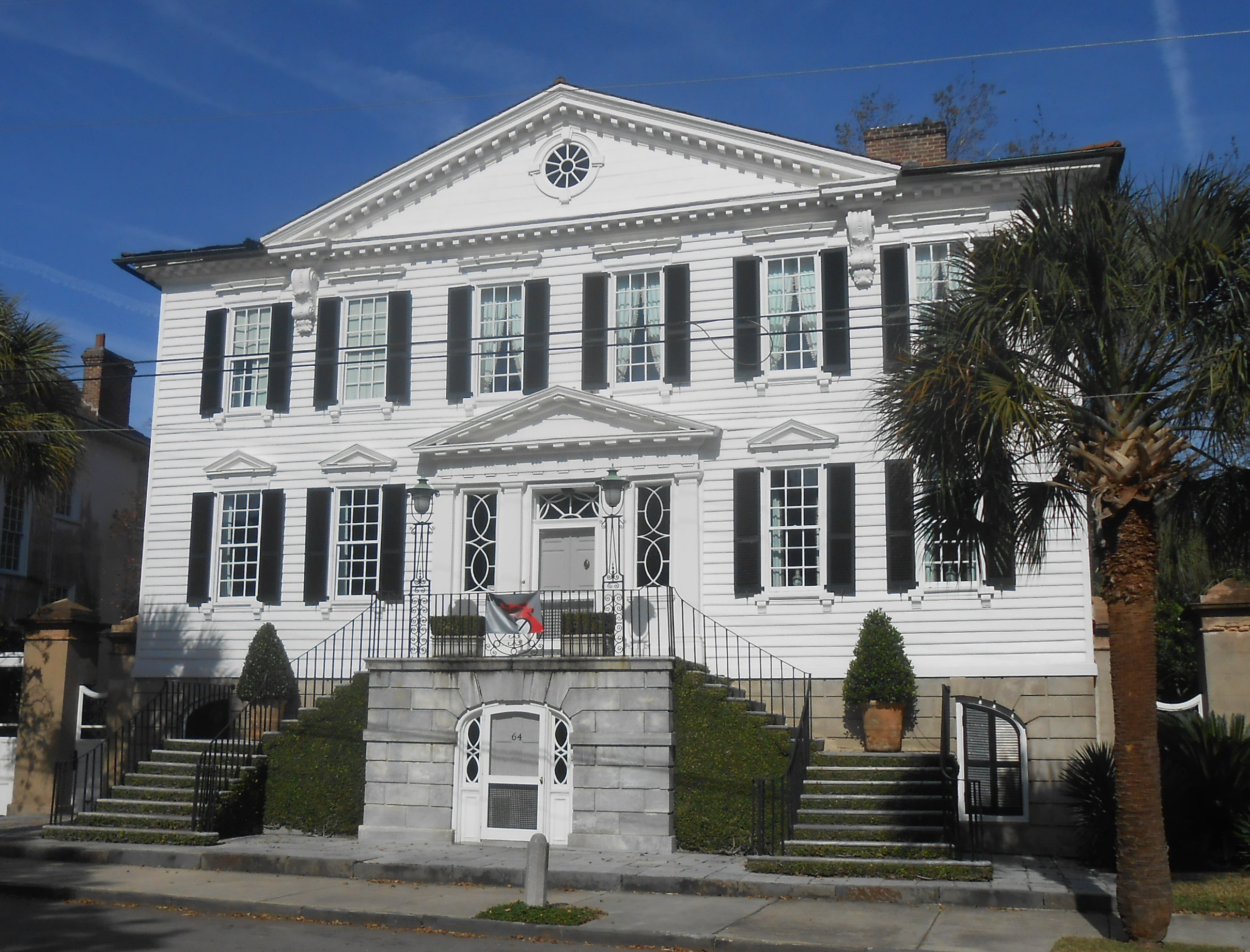
- Gibbes House

- Location within South Carolina Location within the United States
- Location: 64 S. Battery, Charleston, South Carolina
- Coordinates: 32°46′14.5″N 79°55′58.66″W
- Built: 1775
- Architectural style: Georgian
- Part of: Charleston Historic District (ID66000964)
- NRHP reference No.: 70000575

Significant dates
- Added to NRHP: April 15, 1970
- Designated NHL: April 15, 1970
- Designated NHLDCP: October 9, 1960

The William Gibbes House is a historic house at 64 South Battery in Charleston, South Carolina. Built about 1772, it is one of the nation's finest examples of classical Georgian architecture. It was declared a National Historic Landmark in 1970.

== Description and history ==
The Gibbes House is set on the north side of South Battery, at the southern end of the historic Charleston peninsula. It is a two-story wood-frame structure, set on a high stone foundation. It is covered by a hip roof with a front-facing gable, and is sheathed in wooden clapboard siding. The main facade is five bays wide, with a central main entrance that is accessed by stairs descending from the landing on either side, and a service entrance in the basement level between the stairs, set in a segmented-arch opening. The main entrance is set under a broad modillioned pediment, which is supported by four pilasters, with wide sidelight windows between the outer pairs. First-floor windows are framed by pedimented lintels and bracketed sills, while the second-floor windows have flatter cornices. The main roof line is modillioned, as is the gable above, which has a round window at its center.

The interior follows a plan known in Charleston as a "double house". It has four rooms on each floor, two on each side of a central hall, which is an elaborately decorated space with a columned arch and a staircase with a Civil War-era wrought iron railing. Most of its interior stylings are not Georgian but Adamesque, the result of a 1794 restyling. The south parlor spaces are fully paneled. On the second floor is a ballroom with a cove ceiling adorned with plaster medallions and corner fans.

The house lot was purchased by William Gibbes in 1772, and would at that time have included waterfront access. The house was probably built soon afterward, and was certainly completed by 1779. The Smith family purchased the house in 1794, and remodeled portions Adamesque style, including the marble steps in front. The wrought iron balustrade and lantern standards in front are considered among the best ironwork of the Adamesque period in Charleston. After the Civil War, the house was acquired by the widow of Washington Roebling, builder of the Brooklyn Bridge; she extended the building to the north in 1928.

When the house sold for $6.1 million in January 2006, it became the most expensive property to sell on the peninsula to that time. The previous highest sale was for the Col. John Ashe House at 32 South Battery which had sold for $5.1 million in September 2003. The house remained the highest priced house to sell in Charleston until the sale of the Patrick O'Donnell House for $7.2 million.

== See also ==
- List of National Historic Landmarks in South Carolina
- National Register of Historic Places listings in Charleston, South Carolina

Preceded by 7 Meeting Street	Most Expensive House in Charleston, South Carolina; February 1986–April 1987	Succeeded by Simmons-Edwards House

Preceded by Col. John Ashe House	Most Expensive House in Charleston, South Carolina; Jan. 2006–June 2007	Succeeded by Patrick O'Donnell House
