= Charles Pinckney House =

18th-century house in South Carolina, US

Coordinates: 32.775106°N 79.933419°W

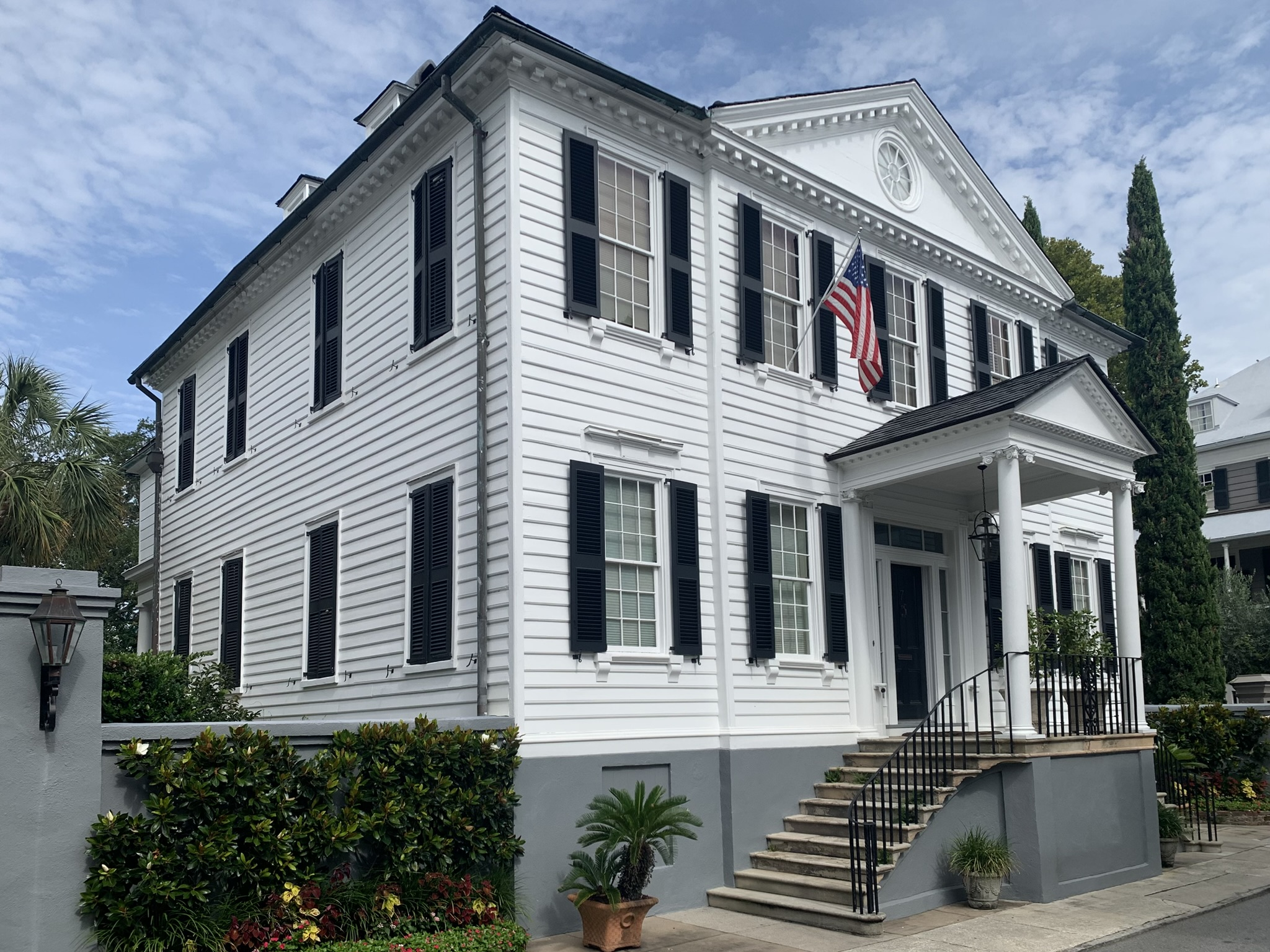
The Charles Pinckney House at 7 Orange Street, Charleston, South Carolina

The Charles Pinckney House is an 18th-century house at 7 Orange Street, Charleston, South Carolina. Alexander Petrie bought the lot in 1747 and constructed the current 2 1/2 story house on a high basement sometime before 1770. The mantels and woodworking are original, but other features including floors and large sliding doors to the parlors date to the early 19th century.

Charles Pinckney was thirteen years old when his father bought 7 Orange Street in 1770, and the family resided at the house until 1778.

The house held the record for the highest price for a Charleston house when it sold in July 2001 for $4,075,000. It held that title until September 2003.

Preceded by Simmons-Edwards House	Most Expensive House in Charleston, South Carolina; July 2001-September 2003	Succeeded by Col. John Ashe House
