= Col. John Ashe House =

18th-century house in South Carolina, US

Coordinates: 32.770731°N 79.931694°W

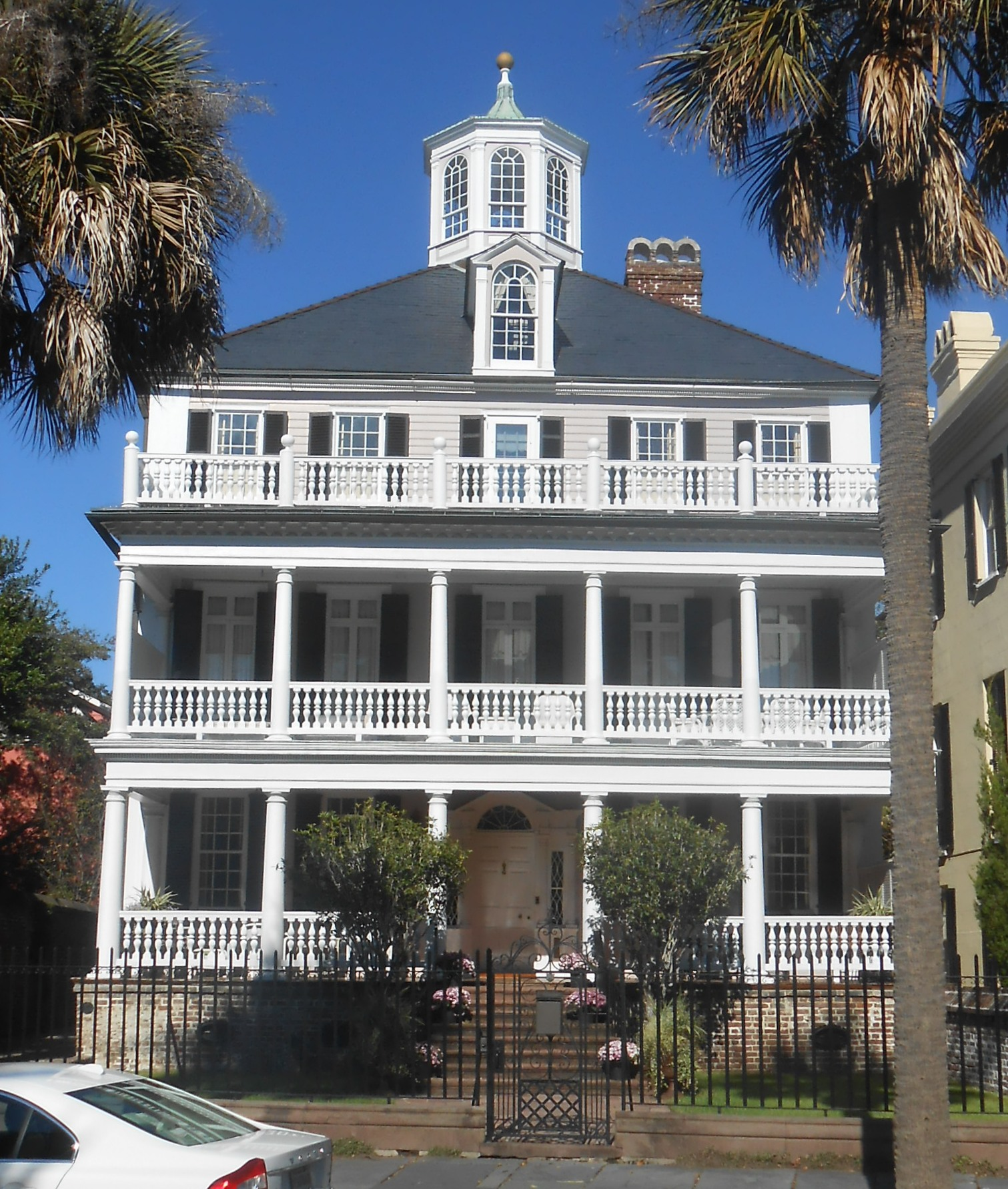
The John Ashe House at 32 South Battery, Charleston, South Carolina

The John Ashe House is an 18th-century house at 32 South Battery, Charleston, South Carolina. The house's date of construction is unknown, but it was built sometime around 1782 and renovated in the 1930s. In August 2015, it replaced the James Simmons House as the most expensive house sold in Charleston when it sold for about $7.72 million.

The house stands on Lot 45 of a subdivision of the peninsula known as the Grand Model Plan. The house is built of black cypress and is a Georgian double house (also known as a block house). It features a three-story piazza across the width of the southern facade overlooking White Point Garden and has a cupola on the hipped roof. Mr. A. Kinloch McDowell bought the house in December 1937, and sold to Mr. Ashmead F. Pringle, Jr., the vice-president of the Merchants Fertilizer Co., in 1944. The sales price at that time was undisclosed, but thought to be near the recent asking price of $40,000, a figure which represented one of the highest sales in Charleston. In an earlier sale, Mr. and Mrs. Howland Spencer of New York bought the house from Mrs. Lane Mullally for $50,000 to use as a winter residence.

It is still privately owned. (as of 2025)

== Record Setting Price ==
The Col. John Ashe House has been the most expensive house to sell in Charleston at two different times.

The house held the record for the highest price for a Charleston house when it sold for $5.1 million in September 2003. The previous record was for the sale of 7 Orange Street in 2001 for $4.1 million. The house retained that title until the sale of the William Gibbes House at 64 South Battery for $6.1 million in January 2006.

The house later regained the title in August 2015 when it sold for about $7.72 million. The house held that title until either March 2020, when just the penthouse of the People's Office Building sold for $12 million, setting the high water mark among all residential sales, or June 2020, when the Sword Gate House sold for $10 million, setting the high water mark among the sales of houses.

Preceded by Charles Pinckney House	Most Expensive House in Charleston, South Carolina; September 2003–January 2006	Succeeded by William Gibbes House

Preceded by James Simmons House	Most Expensive House in Charleston, South Carolina; August 2015–June 2020	Succeeded by Sword Gate House
