= Patrick O'Donnell House =

19th-century house in South Carolina, US

Coordinates: 32.771966°N 79.932318°W

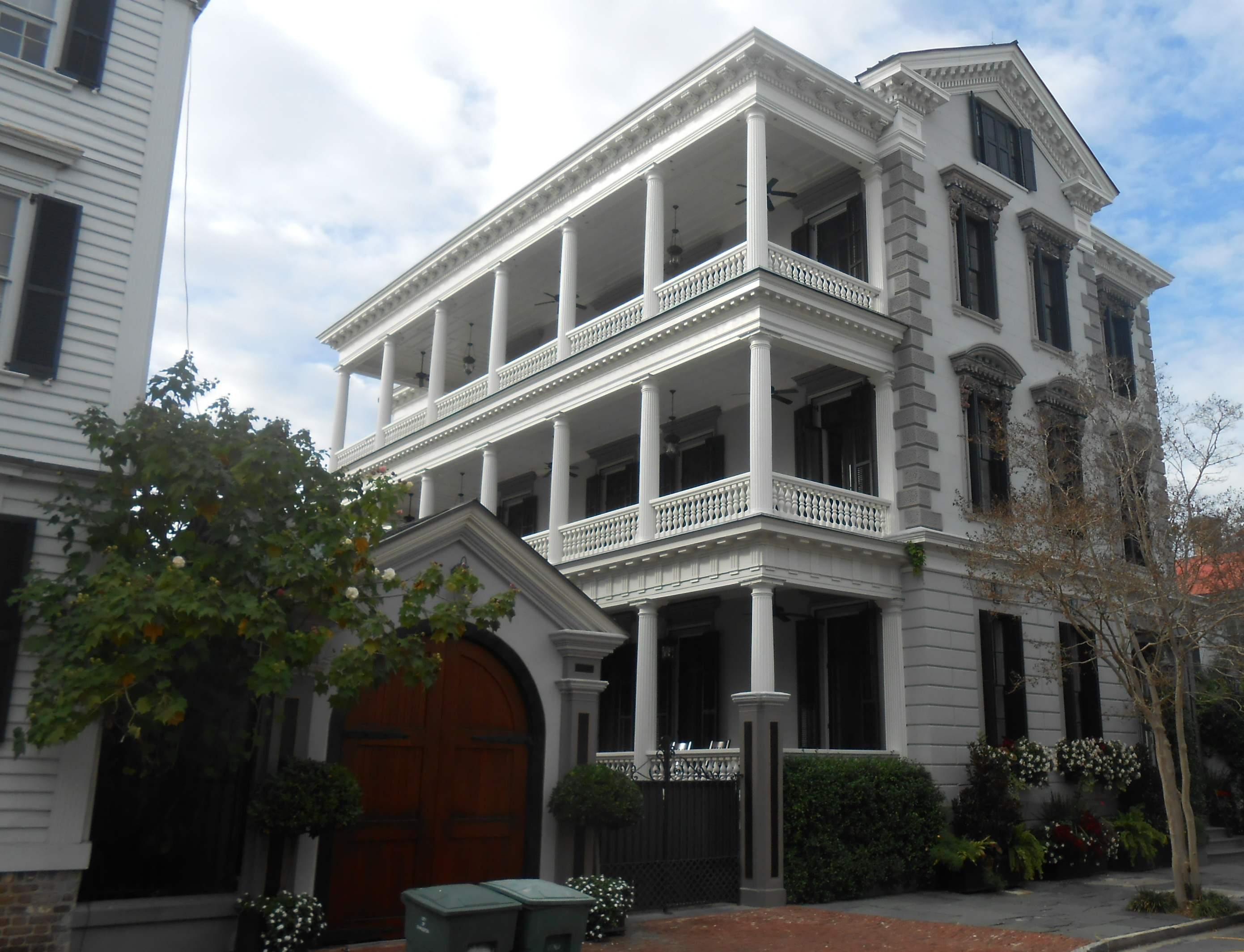
The Patrick O'Donnell House is a notable Italianate house at 21 King St., Charleston, South Carolina.

The Patrick O'Donnell House is the largest example of Italianate architecture in Charleston, South Carolina. It was built for Patrick O'Donnell, perhaps in 1856 or 1857. Other research has suggested a construction date of 1865. Local lore has it that the three-and-a-half-story house was built for his would-be bride who later refused to marry him, giving rise to the house's popular name, "O'Donnell's Folly." Between 1907 and 1937, it was home to Josephine Pinckney; both the Charleston Poetry Society and the Society for the Preservation of Spirituals were formed at the house during her ownership.

It is a classic example of a side hall plan; the house has large, adjacent rooms on the south side with a piazza and a stair hall that runs along the north side of the house. A carriage house in the baronial style was added along the rear property line in 1888 by Thomas R. McGahan.

In 1987, the house was for sale for $750,000, and the Preservation Society of Charleston considered purchasing it. The Society was interested in using the house as a museum house and as its headquarters, and the neighborhood initially supported the plans. Later, the neighborhood changed its position because of worries about parking, and the membership of the Society was split on the proposal. In April 1987, The Society dropped its plans.

The house sold for $7.2 million in June 2007 to James Pallotta, a part owner of the Boston Celtics. At the time, the seven-bedroom, 9,700 square foot house's price was the highest ever paid in Charleston for a house. The previous record holder had been the William Gibbes House at 64 South Battery which had sold for $6.1 million in January 2006. The O'Donnell House retained that distinction until the sale of 37 Meeting St. in May 2009 for $7.37 million.

Preceded by William Gibbes House	Most Expensive House in Charleston, South Carolina; June 2007-May 2009	Succeeded by James Simmons House
