= James Simmons House =

18th-century house in South Carolina, US

Coordinates: 32.773000°N 79.930790°W

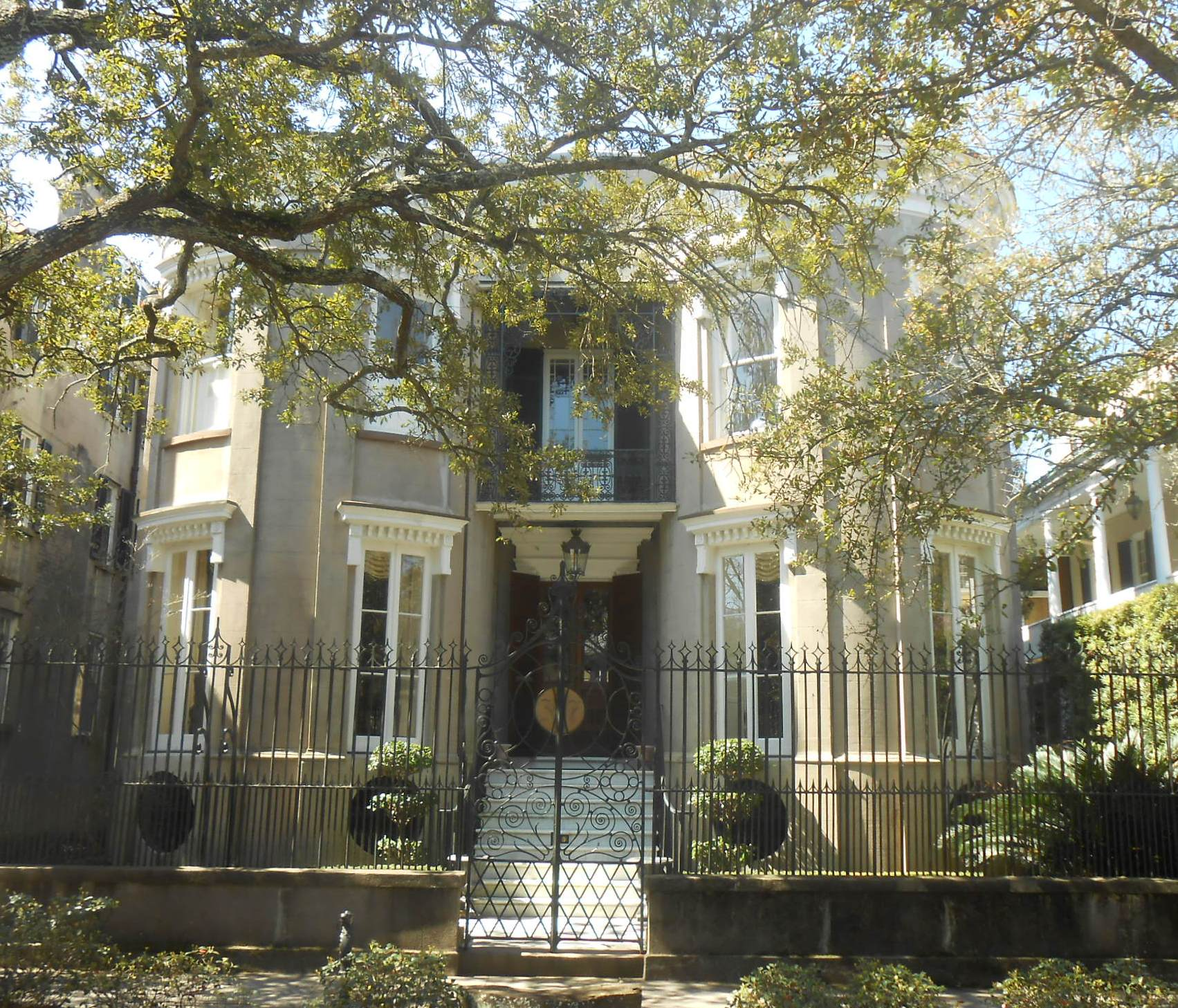
The James Simmons House at 37 Meeting St., Charleston, South Carolina

The James Simmons House is a late 18th-century house at 37 Meeting Street, Charleston, South Carolina which was, at one time, the most expensive house sold in Charleston. It was likely built for James Simmons, a lawyer. By 1782, it was home to Robert Gibbes, a planter. Louisa Cheves (later McCord), a prominent antebellum writer, was born at the house on December 3, 1810. In 1840, Otis Mills, the owner of the Mills House Hotel, bought the house for $9,000. In October 1862, during the Civil War, the house was loaned to Gen. Pierre Beauregard, who used the house as his headquarters until August 1863. In 1876, Michael P. O'Connor, later a member of Congress, bought the house.

The house is a traditional Charleston double house (i.e., four rooms per a floor at the corners with a central hall and staircase) but, unlike most, has matching two-story bay windows on the front façade, perhaps an early 19th-century alteration to an originally flat-faced building.

It was the most expensive house sold in Charleston when it sold for $7.37 million in May 2009, overtaking the previous record holder, the Patrick O'Donnell House. It remained the most expensive house sold in Charleston until August 2015, when the Col. John Ashe House at 32 South Battery sold for about $7.72 million. The house was bought by William and Nancy Longfellow from the founder of Blackbaud and majority owner of the Charleston Battery soccer team Anthony and Linda Bakker.

37 Meeting Street - 1846

Preceded by Patrick O'Donnell House	Most Expensive House in Charleston, South Carolina; May 2009-August 2015	Succeeded by Col. John Ashe House
