= People's Office Building =

Coordinates: 32.776957°N 79.927822°W

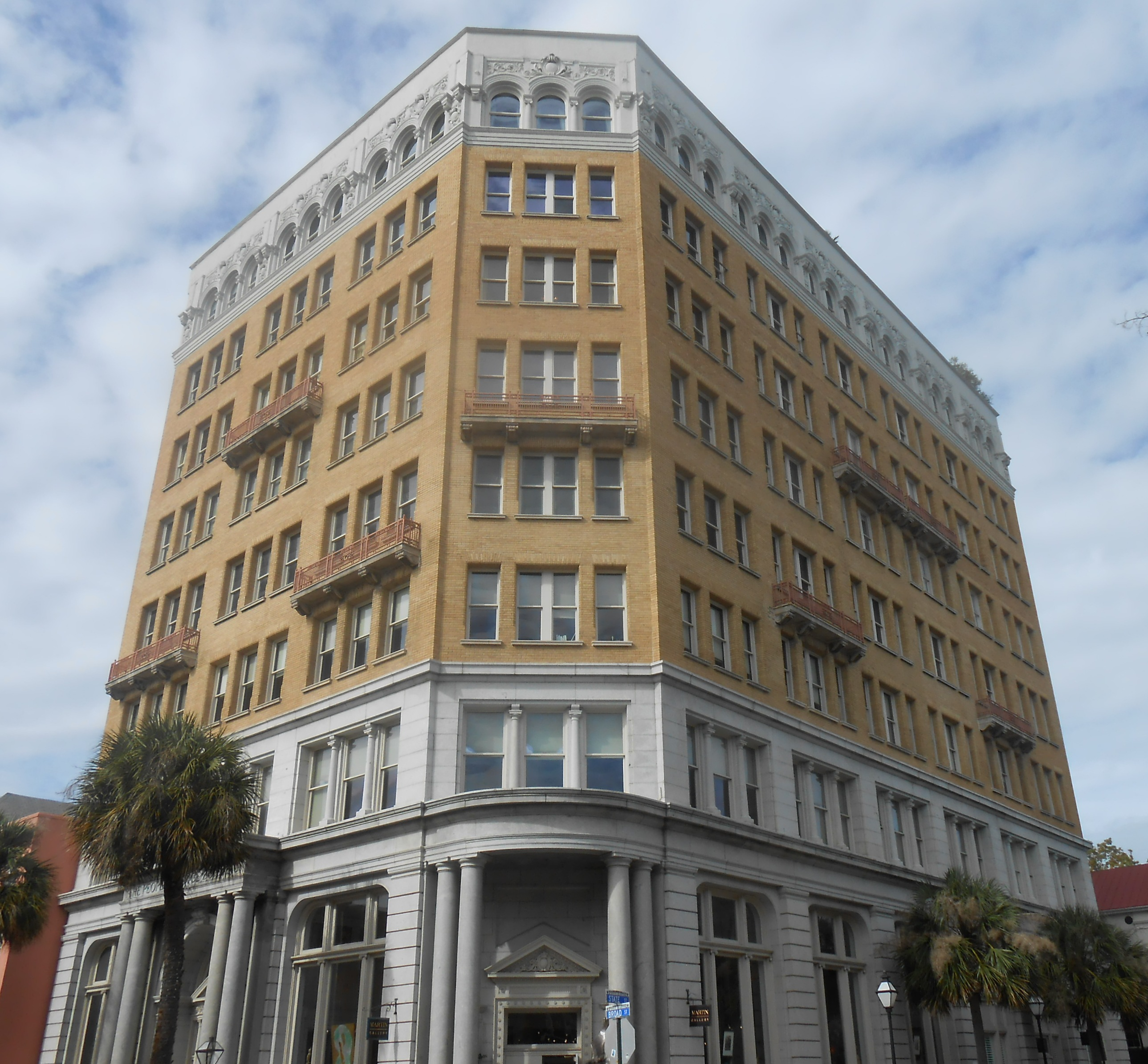
The People's Office Building, 18 Broad St., Charleston, South Carolina

The People's Building at 18 Broad St. was Charleston, South Carolina's first "skyscraper", erected in 1910 and 1911 at a cost of $300,000. It was designed by a Swedish architect, Victor Frohling of Thompson & Frohling, of New York and built by both Simons-Mayrant of Charleston and also the Hadden Construction Co. Construction began on December 7, 1909. The pile driving so weakened a nearby residence that the People's Building & Investment Co. had to buy it. The structure is a steel framed building with iron framing whose engineer was D.C. Barbot. Work continued throughout early 1910. The construction of the building became a popular spectacle for residents to watch. An American flag was placed atop the building's frame when it was topped out in late April 1910. The owners of the building considered installing a rooftop garden to take advantage of the superb views from the building.

The project was organized by R. Goodwyn Rhett, mayor of Charleston and president of the People's National Bank. He organized a group of 50 local leaders who amassed $150,000 in contributions to the enterprise; Mayor Rhett successfully sought a mortgage of the same amount against the yet unbuilt building from New York backers.

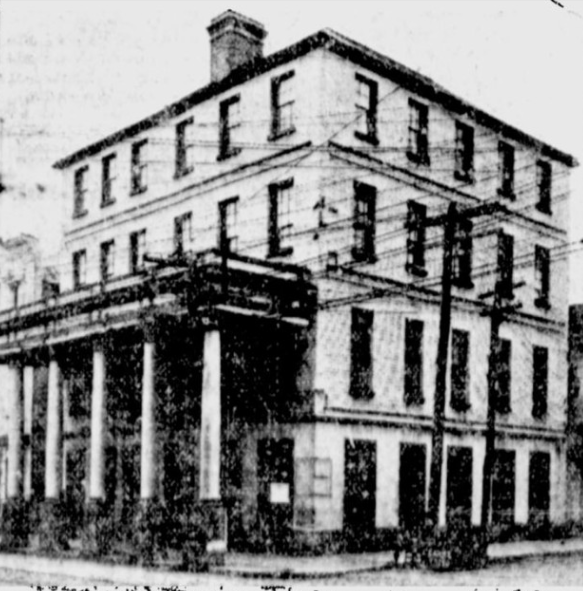
The Bank of the State of South Carolina's building at 18 Broad St. was demolished in 1909 to make way for the new People's Office Building.

Many saw it as a sign of progress while others were afraid it would ruin Charleston's skyline. President William Howard Taft, who viewed the city from the top of the building, said, "I don't believe that it did ruin the skyline, but if it did the view from up here makes it worth it." When the building opened in April 1911, people came just to ride the steel frame elevators. The first two floors of the building are faced with Winnsboro granite, while the upper floors are faced with buff-colored brick and terra cotta. The eight-story building is constructed of concrete and steel and rated as fireproof. Originally it had, in addition to the banking space, nine rooms on a mezzanine and thirteen rooms on each of the upper floors, and the building was steam heated. The People's Bank closed in 1936 and the building was purchased by the Southeastern Securities Co., Charles L. Mullaly, president.

Mullaly installed the two white marble leopards at the main entrance. Carved from Italian marble by an unknown 18th-century artist, the leopards were brought to Charleston from an estate near Boston, Massachusetts. In 1990, a plan was approved by the Board of Architectural Review which would have replaced the leopards with gas lamps, but the plan was not executed. The leopards were removed for repair in 2003 and reinstalled the following year. In June 2011, the leopard on the right of the entrance was destroyed by vandalism. The remaining statue was moved indoors, and both were reproduced in 2013 by Kevin McLean, an art student at the College of Charleston.

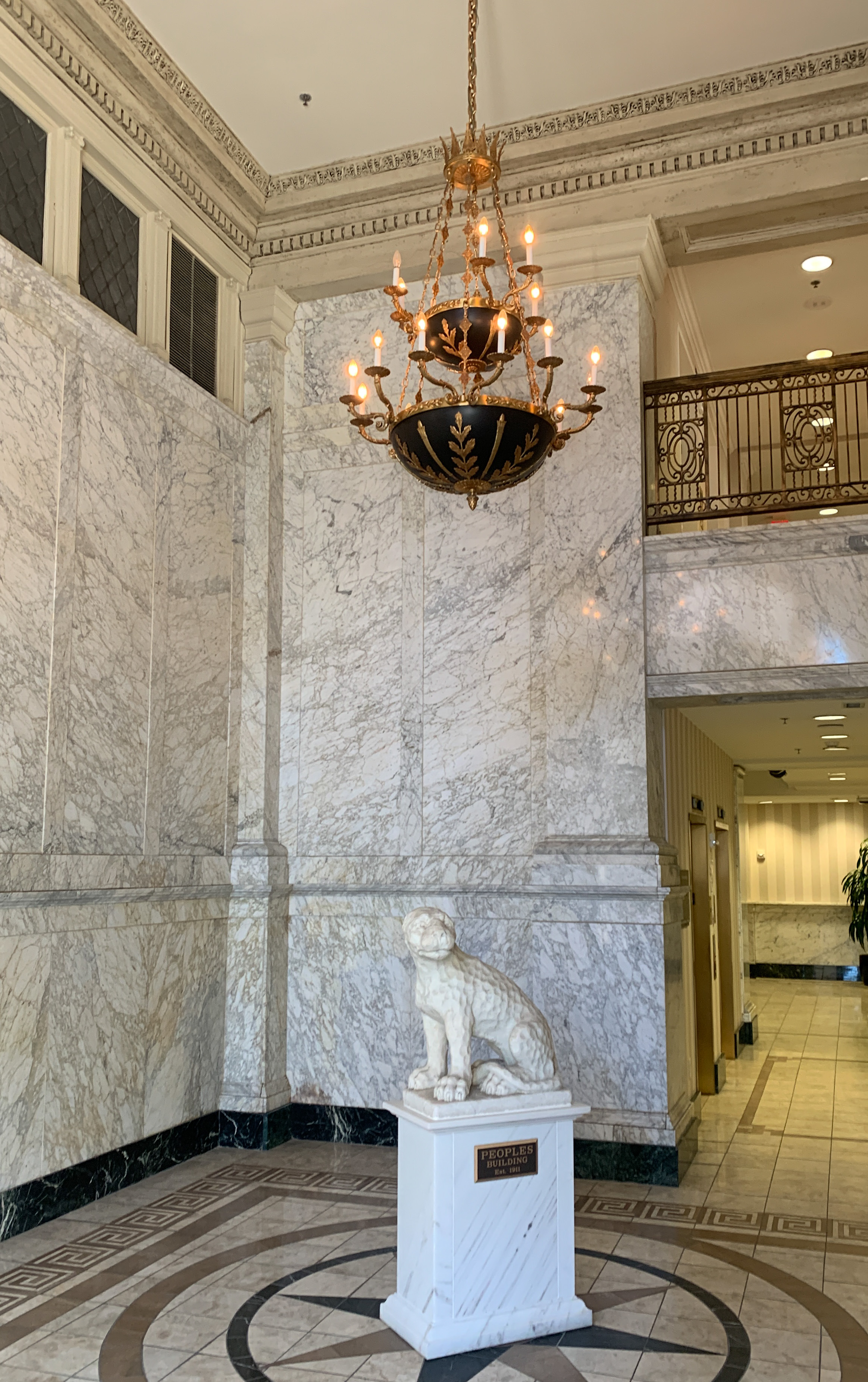
18 Broad Street - lobby

Plans to restore the building as high-grade office space foundered in 1990, and potential developers backed away from a possible purchase of the building over fears that the local market could not support the project in the event of a recession. However, portions of the building were later developed as upscale condos. The two-story penthouse became the most expensive residence (but not house) in Charleston in March 2020 when it sold for $12 million; the previous holder had been the Col. John Ashe House. It remained the most expensive residence on the peninsula until June 2021 when the house at 10 Legare Street sold for $13,500,00.

The building hosted ABC News' Charleston coverage of the August 21, 2017 solar eclipse.
