= National Register of Historic Places listings in Calhoun County, South Carolina =

Location of Calhoun County in South Carolina

This is a list of the National Register of Historic Places listings in Calhoun County, South Carolina.

This is intended to be a complete list of the properties on the National Register of Historic Places in Calhoun County, South Carolina, United States. The locations of National Register properties for which the latitude and longitude coordinates are included below, may be seen in a map.

There are 17 properties listed on the National Register in the county, and one former listing.

This National Park Service list is complete through NPS recent listings posted July 11, 2025.

== Current listings ==
	Name on the Register	Image	Date listed	Location	City or town	Description
1	William Baker House	William Baker House	March 8, 1978 (#78002494)	East of Gaston off U.S. Route 21; 33°49′50″N 80°59′46″W	Gaston	
2	Col. J.A. Banks House	Col. J.A. Banks House	November 24, 1980 (#80003655)	104 Dantzler St. 33°39′45″N 80°46′42″W	St. Matthews	
3	Buyck's Bluff Archeological Site		May 4, 1979 (#79002376)	Address Restricted	St. Matthews	
4	Calhoun County Courthouse	Calhoun County Courthouse	October 30, 1981 (#81000561)	S. Railroad Ave. 33°39′47″N 80°46′46″W	St. Matthews	
5	Calhoun County Library	Calhoun County Library	May 29, 1975 (#75001690)	Railroad Ave. 33°40′01″N 80°46′28″W	St. Matthews	
6	Cherokee Path, Sterling Land Grant		May 13, 1976 (#76001696)	5 miles southeast of St. Matthews on South Carolina Highway 6; 33°38′11″N 80°42′28″W	St. Matthews	
7	Culclasure-Geiger Farmstead		May 26, 2023 (#100008999)	1250 Great Circle Dr. 33°44′56″N 80°53′03″W	St. Matthews vicinity	
8	Col. Olin M. Dantzler House	Col. Olin M. Dantzler House	March 30, 1973 (#73001680)	412 E. Bridge St. 33°39′42″N 80°46′26″W	St. Matthews	
9	Fort Motte Battle Site		November 9, 1972 (#72001195)	Address Restricted	Fort Motte	
10	Haigler House	Haigler House	October 12, 2001 (#01001099)	Winding Brook Dr. 33°33′45″N 80°40′52″W	Cameron	
11	David Houser House	David Houser House	November 25, 1980 (#80003656)	West of St. Matthews on U.S. Route 176; 33°40′37″N 80°50′08″W	St. Matthews	
12	Lang Syne Plantation		July 18, 2014 (#14000429)	Address Restricted	St. Matthews vicinity	
13	Midway Plantation	Midway Plantation	May 28, 1976 (#76001694)	South of Fort Motte off U.S. Route 601; 33°40′31″N 80°41′39″W	Fort Motte	
14	Oakland Plantation	Oakland Plantation	May 30, 1975 (#75001689)	South of Fort Motte; 33°41′12″N 80°40′00″W	Fort Motte	
15	Prehistoric Indian Village	Prehistoric Indian Village	July 30, 1974 (#74001828)	Address Restricted	St. Matthews	
16	Puritan Farm	Puritan Farm	July 25, 1974 (#74001829)	West of St. Matthews; 33°39′48″N 80°48′56″W	St. Matthews	
17	Ulmer-Summers House	Ulmer-Summers House	October 25, 1973 (#73001679)	Old Orangeburg Rd. (South Carolina Highway 31); 33°33′44″N 80°42′55″W	Cameron	

== Former listings ==
	Name on the Register	Image	Date listed	Date removed	Location	City or town	Description
1	Zante Plantation	Zante Plantation	June 29, 1976 (#76001695)	July 15, 2025	Southeast of Fort Motte off South Carolina Highway 601; 33°42′37″N 80°38′32″W	Fort Motte	

== See also ==
- List of National Historic Landmarks in South Carolina
- National Register of Historic Places listings in South Carolina
