= List of plantations in South Carolina =

This is a list of plantations and/or plantation houses in the U.S. state of South Carolina that are National Historic Landmarks, listed on the National Register of Historic Places, listed on a heritage register, or are otherwise significant for their history, association with significant events or people, or their architecture and design.

Color key	Historic register listing
	National Historic Landmark
	National Register of Historic Places
	Contributing property to a National Register of Historic Places historic district
	Not listed on national or state register

NRHP reference number	Name	Image	Date designated	Locality	County	Notes
80003716	Allison Plantation			York		
73001709	Annandale			Georgetown		
78002509	Arcadia Plantation			Georgetown		
75001691	Ashley Hall Plantation			Charleston		
88000526	Beneventum Plantation House			Georgetown		
94000062	Black River			Georgetown		
73001698	Bleak Hall			Edisto Island		
	Boochawe			Goose Creek	Berkeley	
93001512	Boone Hall			Mount Pleasant	Charleston	
72001224	Borough House Plantation	1960 picture from HABS	June 7, 1988	Stateburg; 33.95539°N 80.53489°W	Sumter	
70000580	Brick House Ruins	1939 picture from HABS	April 15, 1970	Edisto Island; 32.59977°N 80.32542°W	Charleston	
86003198	Brookland Plantation			Edisto Island		
91000231	Cedar Grove Plantation Chapel			Pawleys Island		
95000633	Charlton Hall Plantation House			Hickory Tavern		
73001710	Chicora Wood Plantation			Georgetown		
75001687	Coffin Point Plantation			Frogmore		
93000475	Crawford's Plantation House			Edisto Island		
	Crowfield Hall			Goose Creek		
07000098	Dantzler Plantation			Holly Hill		
74001851	Darby Plantation			Edgefield		
71000776	Davis Plantation			Monticello		
	Drake (Ellerslie)			Drake	Marlboro	
66000701	Drayton Hall	Drayton Hall	October 9, 1960	Charleston; 32.87090°N 80.07634°W	Charleston	
	Duncannon			Barnwell	Barnwell	
74001838	Fairfield Plantation			McClellanville		
82001517	Farmfield Plantation House			Charleston		
79002382	Fonti Flora Plantation			Monticello		
66000708	Fort Hill		December 19, 1960	Clemson; 34.67597°N 82.83920°W	Pickens	
96000409	Friendfield Plantation			Georgetown		
88001754	Frogmore Plantation Complex			Frogmore		
86000528	Goodwill Plantation			Eastover		
76001688	Gravel Hill Plantation			Allendale		
10000240	Gravel Hill Plantation			Hampton		
78002495	Grove Plantation			Adams Run		
70000582	Hampton Plantation	Hampton Plantation	April 15, 1970	McClellanville; 33.20112°N 79.43459°W	Charleston	
75001695	Harrietta Plantation			McClellanville	Charleston	
94001236	Hobcaw Barony			Georgetown	Georgetown	
71000782	Hopsewee	Hopesewee	November 11, 1971	Georgetown; 33.21205°N 79.38386°W	Georgetown	
88000529	Keithfield Plantation			Georgetown		
71000806	Kensington Plantation House			Eastover		
86003520	Landsford Plantation House			Landsford Township		
97000095	Laurel Bay Plantation			Beaufort		
77001213	Lawson's Pond Plantation			Cross		
73001678	Lewisfield Plantation			Moncks Corner		
86000468	Long Point Plantation			Mt. Pleasant		
10000299	Lydia Plantation			Lydia		
72001198	Magnolia Plantation and Gardens			Charleston	Charleston	
77001223	Mansfield Plantation			Georgetown	Georgetown	
73001674	Marshlands	1977-79 picture from HABS	November 7, 1973	Beaufort; 32.43352°N 80.66583°W	Beaufort	
73001700	Marshlands Plantation House			James Island		
74001831	McLeod Plantation			Charleston	Charleston	
70000568	Middleburg Plantation	1938 picture	April 15, 1970	Huger; 33.08029°N 79.84365°W	Berkeley	
71000770	Middleton Place		November 11, 1971	Summerville; 32.90014°N 80.13656°W	Dorchester	
71000755	Middleton's Plantation			Edisto Island		
78002518	Midfield Plantation			Boykin		
76001694	Midway Plantation			Fort Motte		
71000808	Millford Plantation	HABS photograph	November 7, 1973	Pinewood; 33.74847°N 80.53751°W	Sumter	
79002394	Mountain Shoals Plantation			Enoree		
66000697	Mulberry Plantation	1960 HABS Photograph	October 9, 1960	Moncks Corner; 33.14361°N 79.98917°W	Berkeley	
80003673	Mulberry Plantation	1977-79 HABS Photograph	February 16, 2000	Camden; 34.20639°N 80.59194°W	Kershaw	
74001850	Newington Plantation			Stallsville		
82003898	Numertia Plantation			Eutawville		
75001689	Oakland Plantation			Fort Motte		
77001218	Oakland Plantation House			Mount Pleasant	Charleston	
94001630	Oaklyn Plantation			Darlington		
	Oaks			Goose Creek	Berkeley	
71000756	Old House Plantation			Edisto Island		
97001159	Old House Plantation			Ridgeland		
88001774	Orange Grove Plantation			Frogmore		
78003191	Otranto Plantation			Hanahan		
73001699	Peter's Point Plantation			Edisto Island		
88001775	Pine Island Plantation Complex			Frogmore		
86003213	Point of Pines Plantation Slave Cabin			Edisto Island		
85003122	Quinby Plantation House-Halidon Hill Plantation			Huger		
97000359	Ravenwood Plantation			Neyles	Colleton	
88000537	Richmond Hill Plantation Archeological Sites			Murrells Inlet		
80003653	Richmond Plantation			Cordesville		
78002532	Rip Raps Plantation			Sumter		
88001776	Riverside Plantation Tabby Ruins			Frogmore		
	Rock Spring Plantation			Round O	Colleton	
83002185	Rose Hill Plantation House			Bluffton	Beaufort	
93000459	Rosemont Plantation			Waterloo		
97001158	Roseville Plantation			Florence		
88000533	Rural Hall Plantation House			Georgetown		
00000591	Salters Plantation House			Salters		
74001841	John Seabrook Plantation Bridge			Rockville		
79002375	Seaside Plantation			Beaufort		
82003840	Seaside Plantation House			Edisto Island		
85002387	Springfield Plantation House			Fort Mill		
80003693	St. Julien Plantation			Eutawville		
94000038	Stoney-Baynard Plantation			Hilton Head Island		
83002188	Summit Plantation House			Adams Run		
94000024	Sunnyside Plantation Foreman's House			Edisto Island		
77001229	Tanglewood Plantation			Lynchburg		
75001688	Tombee Plantation			Frogmore		
	Uriah Plantation			Kershaw	Lancaster	
70000603	Walnut Grove Plantation			Spartanburg	Spartanburg	
80003660	Wedge Plantation			McClellanville	Charleston	
98000423	White Hall Plantation House Ruins and Oak Avenue			Ridgeland		
78002511	Wicklow Hall Plantation			Georgetown		
74001837	Windsor Plantation			Edisto Island		
01000607	Woodland Plantation			Carlisle		
71000742	Woodlands	HABS photograph	November 11, 1971	Bamberg; 33.26833°N 80.95306°W	Bamberg	
76001695	Zante Plantation			Fort Motte		

== See also ==
- History of slavery in South Carolina
- List of plantations in the United States
- Plantations of Leon County, Florida
- Barbados Slave Code
