= Calhoun County Library (disambiguation) =

Calhoun County Library may refer to:

- Calhoun County Library, a historic library building located at St. Matthews Calhoun County, South Carolina.
- Calhoun County Library, a branch of the Kinchafoonee Regional Library System
