= Laurence M. Keitt =

American planter, lawyer and politician (1824–1864)

Laurence Keitt
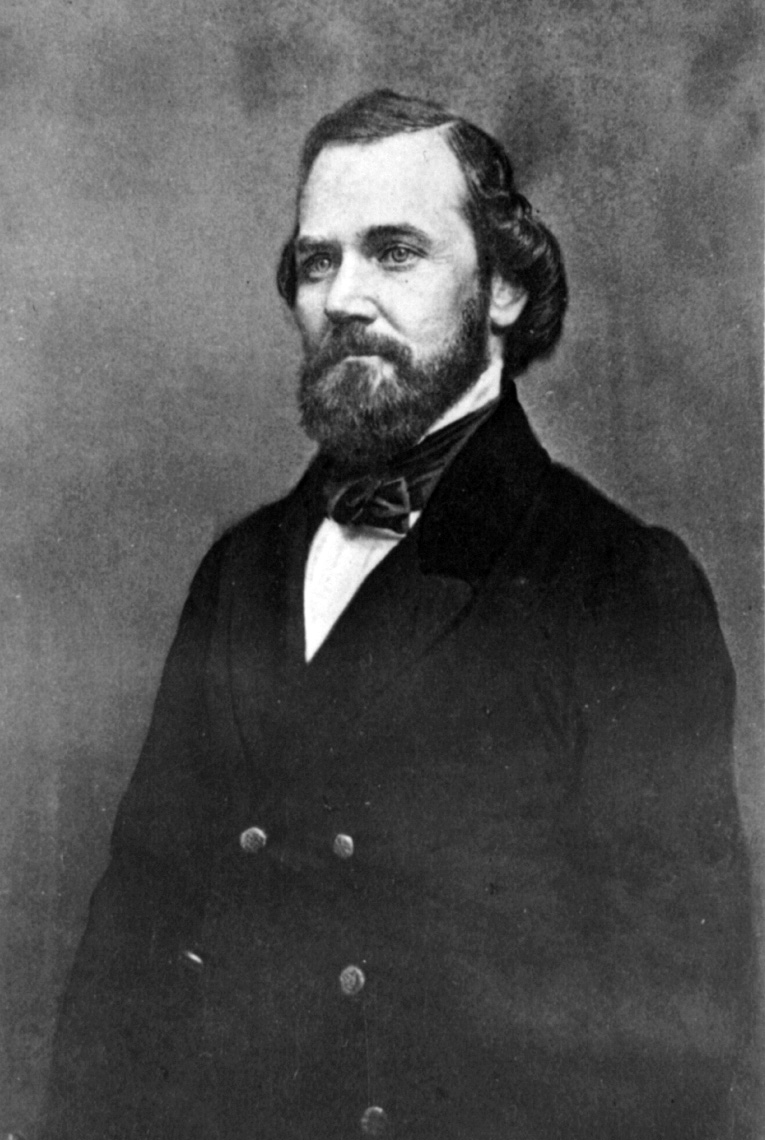
- Keitt, c. 1860

Member of the Confederate Provisional Congress from South Carolina
- In office February 8, 1861 – February 17, 1862
- Preceded by: Seat established
- Succeeded by: Seat abolished

Member of the U.S. House of Representatives from South Carolina's 3rd district
- In office August 6, 1856 – December 1860
- Preceded by: Himself
- Succeeded by: Manuel Corley (1868)
- In office March 4, 1853 – July 15, 1856
- Preceded by: Joseph Woodward
- Succeeded by: Himself

Member of the South Carolina House of Representatives from the Orange Parish district
- In office November 27, 1848 – March 3, 1853

Personal details
- Born: Laurence Massillon Keitt; October 4, 1824 Orangeburg County, South Carolina, U.S. (now Calhoun County)
- Died: June 2, 1864 (aged 39) Richmond, Virginia, U.S.
- Party: Democratic
- Children: 2
- Education: University of South Carolina (BA)

Military service
- Allegiance: Confederate States
- Branch/service: Confederate States Army
- Years of service: 1862–1864
- Rank: Colonel
- Battles/wars: American Civil War; Second Battle of Charleston Harbor; Battle of Cold Harbor (DOW)

Laurence Massillon Keitt (October 4, 1824 – June 2, 1864) was an American planter, lawyer, politician, and soldier from South Carolina. During his tenure in the United States House of Representatives, he was included in several lists of Fire-Eaters—men who adamantly urged the secession of southern states from the United States, and who resisted measures of compromise and reconciliation, leading to the American Civil War.

Keitt is notable for his involvement in two separate acts of legislative violence in the Congressional chambers. In the first, Keitt assisted fellow South Carolina Representative Preston Brooks in his 1856 attack on Republican Senator Charles Sumner. During the attack, Keitt brandished a pistol and cane to prevent other senators from coming to Sumner's aid. The second was in 1858, when he attacked and attempted to choke Republican Representative Galusha Grow during an argument on the floor of the U.S. House.

When the Civil War began, he served as a deputy of the Provisional Confederate States Congress and later as a colonel in the Confederate States Army, until he was mortally wounded at the Battle of Cold Harbor in June 1864.

== Early life and education ==
Keitt was born at Puritan Farm in Orangeburg County (present-day Calhoun County, South Carolina). He graduated from South Carolina College in 1843, studied law, was admitted to the bar in 1845, and practiced in Orangeburg.

== Career ==
=== Early career ===
A member of the Democratic Party, he served in the South Carolina House of Representatives from 1848 to 1853. From 1853 to 1856, he served in the U.S. House of Representative from South Carolina's 3rd District.

=== Caning of Charles Sumner ===
Keitt was censured by the House in 1856 for aiding Rep. Preston Brooks in his caning of Charles Sumner. Brooks had considered challenging Sumner to a duel after Sumner's anti-slavery The Crime Against Kansas speech, which Brooks interpreted as an insult to his cousin, Senator Andrew Butler. After consulting with Keitt and deciding that Sumner was no gentleman, and therefore not worthy of a duel, Brooks resolved to beat Sumner with a cane instead.

With Keitt and Virginia Representative Henry A. Edmundson on hand to assist, on May 22, 1856, Brooks entered the Senate chamber and began beating the defenseless Sumner with his gold-headed cane, while Edmundson and Keitt prevented others from stopping Brooks or aiding Sumner. Keitt drew a pistol from his belt and brandished his own cane, holding off the horror-struck senators who tried to assist Sumner, loudly announcing "Let them be!" In July, the House censured Keitt for his part in the attack. He resigned in order to create a vacancy that would be filled by special election, thus giving his constituents the opportunity to ratify or condemn his conduct. They supported Keitt's actions, overwhelmingly returning him to Congress in the August special election. He served until December 1860, when South Carolina seceded from the Union.

=== Later career ===
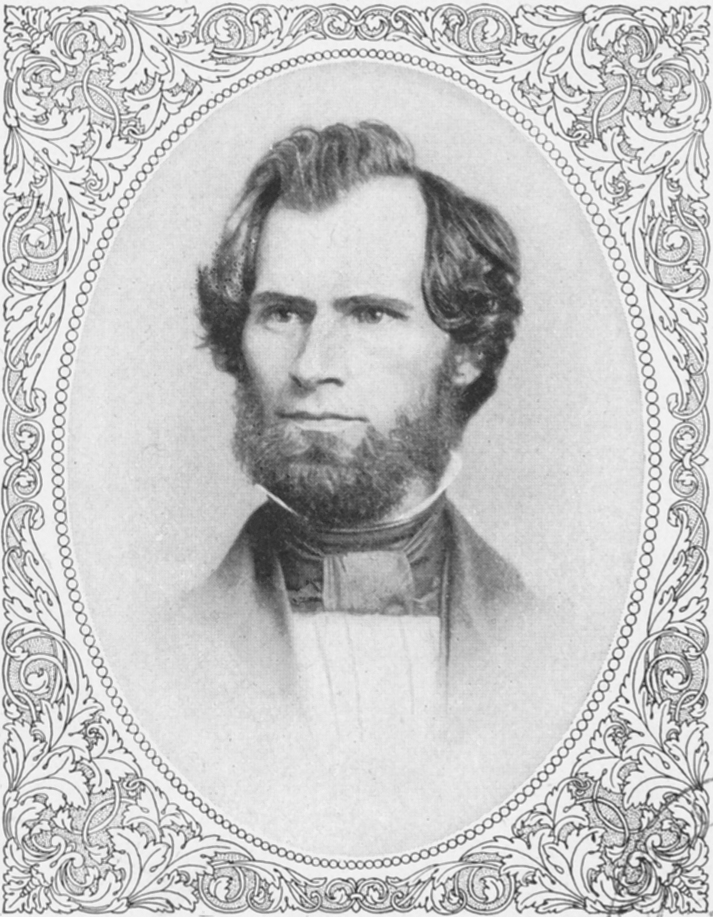
Galusha Grow, c. 1859

On February 5, 1858, Keitt started a massive brawl on the House floor during a tense late-night debate. Keitt, offended by Pennsylvania Congressman (and later Speaker of the House) Galusha A. Grow, a Republican, having stepped over to the Democratic side of the House chamber, dismissively demanded that Grow sit down, calling him a "black Republican puppy". Grow responded by telling Keitt that "No negro-driver shall crack his whip over me." Keitt became enraged and went for Grow's throat, shouting that he would "choke [him] for that". A large brawl involving approximately 50 representatives erupted on the House floor, ending only when a missed punch from Rep. Cadwallader Washburn of Wisconsin upended the hairpiece of Rep. William Barksdale of Mississippi. The embarrassed Barksdale accidentally replaced the wig backwards, causing both sides to erupt in spontaneous laughter.

Perhaps Keitt's most famous quotation best summarized his political views and dominant agenda. In 1860, Congressman Keitt said, "The anti-slavery party contends that slavery is wrong in itself, and the government is a consolidated national democracy. We of the South contend that slavery is right, and that this is a confederate republic of sovereign states."

After South Carolina's secession Keitt served as a delegate to the Provisional Confederate Congress from 1861 to 1862.

== Personal life ==
He married Sue Mandeville Sparks (1834-1915) on May 18, 1859. They had two daughters.

== American Civil War and death ==
Keitt later joined the Confederate States Army, and attained the rank of colonel as commander of the 20th South Carolina Volunteer Infantry Regiment. He later commanded Kershaw's Brigade, succeeding to this position after Kershaw advanced to command of a division.

During the Battle of Cold Harbor on June 1, 1864, Keitt —in his first experience of combat in the field— was leading his infantry brigade on a horse in a charge on Philip Sheridan's dismounted cavalry near Beulah Church when he was shot in the liver or lung. He suffered a mortal wound while his forces collapsed into disarray. He died the next day (though some sources say 3 or 4 June) near Richmond, Virginia, and is buried at West End Cemetery in St. Matthews, South Carolina.

U.S. House of Representatives
Preceded by Joseph Woodward	Member of the U.S. House of Representatives from South Carolina's 3rd congressional district 1853–1856	Succeeded by Himself
Preceded by Himself	Member of the U.S. House of Representatives from South Carolina's 3rd congressional district 1856–1860	Vacant Title next held by Manuel Corley; 1868
Political offices
New seat	Member of the Confederate Provisional Congress from South Carolina; 1861–1862	Seat abolished
