= Lang Syne Plantation =

Historic house in South Carolina, United States

- U.S. National Register of Historic Places
- Location within South Carolina Location within the United States
- Location: Address Restricted, near St. Matthews, South Carolina
- Coordinates: 33°43′50″N 80°39′55″W
- Built: 1901
- NRHP reference No.: 14000429
- Added to NRHP: July 18, 2014

Lang Syne Plantation is a historic plantation near St. Matthews, Calhoun County, South Carolina. The plantation was established in the 18th century by Ann Heatly Reid Lovell and her nephew Langdon Cheves, a prominent South Carolina politician and president of the Second Bank of the United States.

The present Classical Revival plantation house was built in 1901. Julia Peterkin lived there with her planter husband and based many of her novels on the Gullah people of the Low Country. She won a 1929 Pulitzer Prize for her novel Scarlet Sister Mary.

The plantation was listed in the National Register of Historic Places in 2014.

== See also ==
- National Register of Historic Places listings in Calhoun County, South Carolina
