= Othniel (given name) =

Othniel is the name of the first of the Biblical Judges. It can also be a given name. Notable people with the given name include:

- Othniel Dossevi (born 1947), Togolese footballer
- Othniel Looker (1757–1845), American politician from Ohio and member of the Democratic-Republican Party. Briefly fifth Governor of Ohio
- Othniel Charles Marsh (1831–1899), American paleontologist
- Othniel Tripp (1826–?), American sailor
- Othniel Wienges (1924–2013), American horse breeder and politician

== See also ==
- Othniel Looker House, registered historic building in Harrison, Ohio
