= Calhoun County =

Calhoun County is the name of several counties in the United States of America named after U.S. Vice President John C. Calhoun:

- Calhoun County, Alabama
- Calhoun County, Arkansas
- Calhoun County, Florida
- Calhoun County, Georgia
- Calhoun County, Illinois
- Calhoun County, Iowa
- Calhoun County, Michigan
- Calhoun County, Mississippi
- Calhoun County, South Carolina
- Calhoun County, Texas
- Calhoun County, West Virginia

== See also ==
- USS Calhoun County (LST-519), a World War II U.S. tank landing ship
