= Cherokee Trail (disambiguation) =

The Cherokee Trail is a historic trail from Oklahoma to Wyoming.

Cherokee Trail may also refer to:

- Cherokee Trail at Stone Mountain, Georgia
- Trail of Tears, the forced relocation of Cherokee and others to Indian Territory
- Cherokee Trail High School in Aurora, Colorado
- Cherokee Path, colonial trade route in modern South Carolina
