= Midway Plantation =

Midway Plantation may refer to:

- Midway Plantation House and Outbuildings, listed on the National Register of Historic Places in Wake County, North Carolina
- Midway Plantation (Fort Motte, South Carolina), listed on the National Register of Historic Places in Calhoun County, South Carolina
