= Russell Ott =

American politician (born 1978)

Member of the South Carolina Senate from the 26th district
- Incumbent
- Assumed office January 14, 2025
- Preceded by: Nikki Setzler

Member of the South Carolina House of Representatives from the 93rd district
- In office October 29, 2013 – January 14, 2025
- Preceded by: Harry L. Ott Jr.
- Succeeded by: Jerry Govan Jr.

Personal details
- Born: Russell L. Ott; March 16, 1978 (age 48) St. Matthews, South Carolina, U.S.
- Party: Democratic
- Relatives: Harry L. Ott Jr. (father)
- Education: Clemson University (BA); University of South Carolina (MPA)

Russell L. Ott (born March 26, 1978) is an American lobbyist and politician from the state of South Carolina. A member of the Democratic Party, he is a member of the South Carolina State Senate from District 26 in Columbia's southern suburbs.

== Early life ==
Ott is a native of St. Matthews, South Carolina. He graduated from Clemson University with a Bachelor's degree in English. He received his Master of Public Administration from the University of South Carolina. He has served as a member and state convention delegate for the Calhoun County Democratic Party. Ott worked as a lobbyist for the South Carolina Farm Bureau Federation for eight years.

== Political career ==
=== South Carolina Senate ===
On February 13, 2024, Ott announced his candidacy for State Senate District 26 seat, held by incumbent Senator Nikki G. Setzler, who opted not to run for re-election. State Senator Dick Harpootlian, whose home was put in the same District as Setzler after re-districting, also announced for the seat.

The primary race between Ott and Harpootlian generated headlines. Ott was endorsed by St. Matthews Mayor Helen Carson-Peterson. Harpootlian was endorsed by Congressman Jim Clyburn and former State Representative Bakari Sellers. Ultimately, Ott beat Harpootlian in the primary election by about 2%.

Ott face Republican Jason Guerry and defeated him in the general election. Upon taking office, Ott became the only elected Democrat representing a significant portion of heavily Republican Lexington County above the county level. His predecessor, Setzler, had been the only elected Democrat above the county level for much of his tenure.

Ott serves on the Senate Agriculture and Natural Resources, Family and Veterans' Services; Fish, Game and Forestry, Judiciary and Rules committees.

=== South Carolina House of Representatives ===
Harry L. Ott, Jr., Russell's father, represented the 93rd district in the South Carolina House of Representatives, but resigned on June 30, 2013, to take a job with the Farm Service Agency. Russell declared his candidacy in the October 29 special election to fill the remainder of his father's term. He won the election, defeating Republican Charles Stoudemire. In the 2022 general election, Russell won re-election against Republican challenger Jim Ulmer.

Ott served on the House Legislative Oversight and the Labor, Commerce and Industry Committees. He is a former Assistant Minority Leader of the House.

== Personal ==
Ott has two sons.
