= 2000 United States presidential election in South Carolina =

- November 7, 2000

Nominee	George W. Bush	Al Gore
Party	Republican	Democratic
Home state	Texas	Tennessee
Running mate	Dick Cheney	Joe Lieberman
Electoral vote	8	0
Popular vote	786,426	566,039
Percentage	56.83%	40.91%
County results
Bush
50–60%
60–70%
70–80%
Gore
50–60%
60–70%
70–80%
President before election
Bill Clinton
Democratic
Elected President
George W. Bush
Republican

The 2000 United States presidential election in South Carolina took place on November 7, 2000, and was part of the 2000 United States presidential election. Voters chose eight representatives, or electors, to the Electoral College, who voted for president and vice president.

South Carolina was won by Governor George W. Bush by a 15.92% margin of victory. As of the 2024 presidential election, this is the last election in which Sumter County voted for a Republican presidential candidate.

== Primaries ==
=== Republican primary ===
The Republican primary was held on February 19, 2000, with 37 delegates at stake. South Carolina would prove to be a crucially important state for then-Texas Governor George W. Bush after losing to Arizona Senator John McCain in New Hampshire by 18 points. Bush won the South Carolina primary by an 11.5% margin, and took the lion's share of the delegates at stake.

==== Candidates ====
- Governor George W. Bush of Texas
- Former Ambassador Alan Keyes of Maryland
- Senator John McCain of Arizona

==== Withdrawn ====
- Former Undersecretary of Education Gary Bauer of Kentucky
- Businessman Steve Forbes of New Jersey
- Senator Orrin Hatch of Utah

==== Results ====
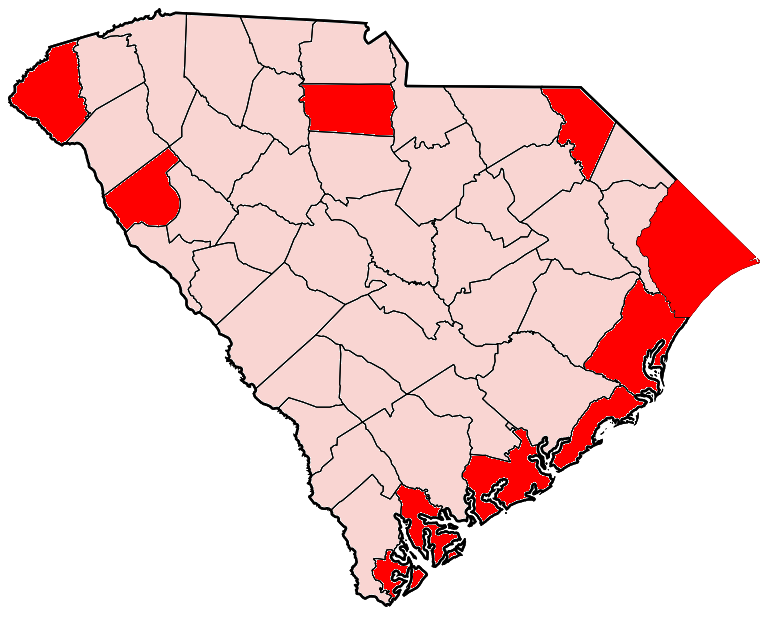
2000 South Carolina primary county map George W. Bush John McCain

Candidate	Votes	Percentage	Delegates
George W. Bush	305,998	53.39%	34
John McCain	239,964	41.87%	3
Alan Keyes	25,996	4.54%	0
Other	1,144	0.20%	0
Total	573,101	100.00%	37

=== Democratic caucuses ===
The Democratic caucuses were held on March 7, with 43 delegates at stake. As the only major candidate left in the race, Vice President Al Gore easily won all the delegates.

==== Candidates ====
- Vice President Al Gore of Tennessee
- William Kreml of South Carolina

==== Withdrawn ====
- U.S. Senator Bill Bradley of New Jersey

==== Results ====
Candidate	Votes	Percentage	Delegates
Al Gore	8,864	91.79%	43
Uncommitted	514	5.32%	0
Bill Bradley	172	1.78%	0
William Kreml	107	1.11%	0
Total	9,657	100%	34

== General election ==
=== Predictions ===
Source	Rating	As of
The Orlando Sentinel	Certain R	September 10, 2000
The Island Packet	Likely R	September 17, 2000
The News and Observer	Likely R	October 18, 2000
Richmond Times-Dispatch	Safe R	October 29, 2000
The State	Safe R	October 30, 2000
The Central New Jersey Home News	Solid R	November 2, 2000
Los Angeles Times	Safe R	November 3, 2000

=== Polling ===
Poll source	Date(s)	Sample size	Margin of error	George W. Bush (R)	Al Gore (D)	Ralph Nader (G)	Other / undecided (Note: Calculated by taking the difference of 100% and all other listed candidates combined. For polls that do not report a figure for Nader, this includes his support.)
Mason-Dixon Polling & Strategy	October 29, 2000	625	—	53%	38%	2%	7%
SurveyUSA	October 22, 2000	500	—	54%	41%	—	5%

=== Results ===
2000 United States presidential election in South Carolina
Party	Candidate	Votes	Percentage	Electoral votes
Republican	George W. Bush	786,426	56.83%	8
Democratic	Al Gore	566,039	40.91%	0
United Citizens	Ralph Nader	20,279	1.47%	0
Libertarian	Harry Browne	4,888	0.35%	0
Reform	Pat Buchanan	3,520	0.25%	0
Constitution	Howard Phillips	1,682	0.12%	0
Natural Law	John Hagelin	943	0.07%	0

==== Results by county ====
County	George W. Bush Republican		Al Gore Democratic		Various candidates Other parties		Margin		Total votes cast
County	#	%	#	%	#	%	#	%	Total votes cast
Abbeville	4,450	53.14%	3,766	44.97%	158	1.89%	684	8.17%	8,374
Aiken	33,203	65.38%	16,409	32.31%	1,170	2.30%	16,794	33.07%	50,782
Allendale	967	28.95%	2,338	70.00%	35	1.05%	-1,371	-41.05%	3,340
Anderson	35,827	63.21%	19,606	34.59%	1,248	2.20%	16,221	28.62%	56,681
Bamberg	2,047	36.88%	3,451	62.17%	53	0.95%	-1,404	-25.29%	5,551
Barnwell	4,521	54.63%	3,661	44.24%	94	1.14%	860	10.39%	8,276
Beaufort	25,561	57.90%	17,487	39.61%	1,100	2.49%	8,074	18.29%	44,148
Berkeley	24,796	57.24%	17,707	40.88%	813	1.88%	7,089	16.36%	43,316
Calhoun	3,216	50.46%	3,063	48.06%	94	1.47%	153	2.40%	6,373
Charleston	58,229	52.23%	49,520	44.42%	3,727	3.34%	8,709	7.81%	111,476
Cherokee	9,900	60.65%	6,138	37.60%	285	1.75%	3,762	23.05%	16,323
Chester	4,986	47.80%	5,242	50.25%	204	1.96%	-256	-2.45%	10,432
Chesterfield	6,266	50.02%	6,111	48.79%	149	1.19%	155	1.23%	12,526
Clarendon	5,186	45.93%	5,999	53.14%	105	0.93%	-813	-7.21%	11,290
Colleton	6,767	50.54%	6,449	48.16%	174	1.30%	318	2.38%	13,390
Darlington	11,290	51.64%	10,253	46.90%	320	1.46%	1,037	4.74%	21,863
Dillon	3,975	44.22%	4,930	54.84%	85	0.95%	-955	-10.62%	8,990
Dorchester	20,734	61.63%	12,168	36.17%	739	2.20%	8,566	25.46%	33,641
Edgefield	4,760	53.88%	3,950	44.71%	124	1.40%	810	9.17%	8,834
Fairfield	3,011	35.85%	5,263	62.67%	124	1.48%	-2,252	-26.82%	8,398
Florence	23,678	57.14%	17,157	41.41%	602	1.45%	6,521	15.73%	41,437
Georgetown	10,535	51.77%	9,445	46.41%	371	1.82%	1,090	5.36%	20,351
Greenville	92,714	66.09%	43,810	31.23%	3,769	2.69%	48,904	34.86%	140,293
Greenwood	12,193	58.45%	8,139	39.02%	528	2.53%	4,054	19.43%	20,860
Hampton	2,798	36.06%	4,896	63.10%	65	0.84%	-2,098	-27.04%	7,759
Horry	40,300	56.55%	29,113	40.85%	1,852	2.60%	11,187	15.70%	71,265
Jasper	2,414	37.32%	3,646	56.36%	409	6.32%	-1,232	-19.04%	6,469
Kershaw	11,911	60.53%	7,428	37.75%	338	1.72%	4,483	22.78%	19,677
Lancaster	11,676	56.39%	8,782	42.41%	247	1.19%	2,894	13.98%	20,705
Laurens	12,102	59.29%	7,920	38.80%	388	1.90%	4,182	20.49%	20,410
Lee	2,675	40.27%	3,899	58.70%	68	1.02%	-1,224	-18.43%	6,642
Lexington	58,095	69.93%	22,830	27.48%	2,156	2.60%	35,265	42.45%	83,081
McCormick	1,704	46.54%	1,896	51.79%	61	1.67%	-192	-5.25%	3,661
Marion	4,687	38.58%	7,358	60.56%	104	0.86%	-2,671	-21.98%	12,149
Marlboro	2,699	34.24%	5,060	64.19%	124	1.57%	-2,361	-29.95%	7,883
Newberry	7,492	60.56%	4,428	35.79%	452	3.65%	3,064	24.77%	12,372
Oconee	15,364	65.17%	7,571	32.11%	640	2.71%	7,793	33.06%	23,575
Orangeburg	12,657	38.67%	19,802	60.49%	275	0.84%	-7,145	-21.82%	32,734
Pickens	24,681	71.37%	8,927	25.81%	974	2.82%	15,754	45.56%	34,582
Richland	50,164	43.07%	63,179	54.24%	3,138	2.69%	-13,015	-11.17%	116,481
Saluda	4,098	59.47%	2,682	38.92%	111	1.61%	1,416	20.55%	6,891
Spartanburg	52,114	62.37%	29,559	35.38%	1,880	2.25%	22,555	26.99%	83,553
Sumter	15,915	51.89%	14,365	46.83%	392	1.28%	1,550	5.06%	30,672
Union	5,768	54.47%	4,662	44.03%	159	1.50%	1,106	10.44%	10,589
Williamsburg	4,524	39.93%	6,723	59.33%	84	0.74%	-2,199	-19.40%	11,331
York	33,776	62.14%	19,251	35.42%	1,324	2.44%	14,525	26.72%	54,351
Totals	786,426	56.83%	566,039	40.91%	31,312	2.26%	220,387	15.93%	1,383,777

===== Counties that flipped from Democratic to Republican =====
- Abbeville (largest city: Abbeville)
- Calhoun (largest city: St. Matthews)
- Chesterfield (largest city: Cheraw)
- Colleton (largest city: Walterboro)
- Darlington (largest city: Hartsville)
- Georgetown (largest city: Murrells Inlet)
- Lancaster (largest city: Lancaster)
- Sumter (largest city: Sumter)
- Union (largest city: Union)

==== Results by congressional district ====
Bush won five of six congressional districts, including one that elected a Democrat.

District	Bush	Gore	Representative
1st	59%	38%	Mark Sanford
1st	59%	38%	Henry E. Brown Jr.
2nd	58%	39%	Floyd Spence
3rd	63%	35%	Lindsey Graham
4th	64%	33%	Jim DeMint
5th	56%	42%	John Spratt
6th	36%	63%	Jim Clyburn

== Electors ==
The electors of each state and the District of Columbia met on December 18, 2000 to cast their votes for president and vice president. The Electoral College itself never meets as one body. Instead, the electors from each state and the District of Columbia met in their respective capitols.

The following were the members of the Electoral College from the state. All were pledged to and voted for George Bush and Dick Cheney:

1. Cynthia F. Costa
2. Danny R. Faulkner
3. Thomas H. McLean
4. William B. Prince
5. Dan Richardson
6. Douglas L. Wavle
7. Cecil F. Windham Sr.
8. Buddy Witherspoon

== See also ==
- 2000 Republican Party presidential primaries
- South Carolina primary
