= Calhoun Academy =

Calhoun Academy may refer to:

- Calhoun Academy (Mississippi), a private school in Pittsboro, Mississippi
- Calhoun Academy (South Carolina), a private school in St. Matthews, South Carolina
- John C. Calhoun Academy, former name of Colleton Preparatory Academy, a private school in Walterboro, South Carolina
