= Col. Olin M. Dantzler House =

Historic house in South Carolina, United States

- U.S. National Register of Historic Places
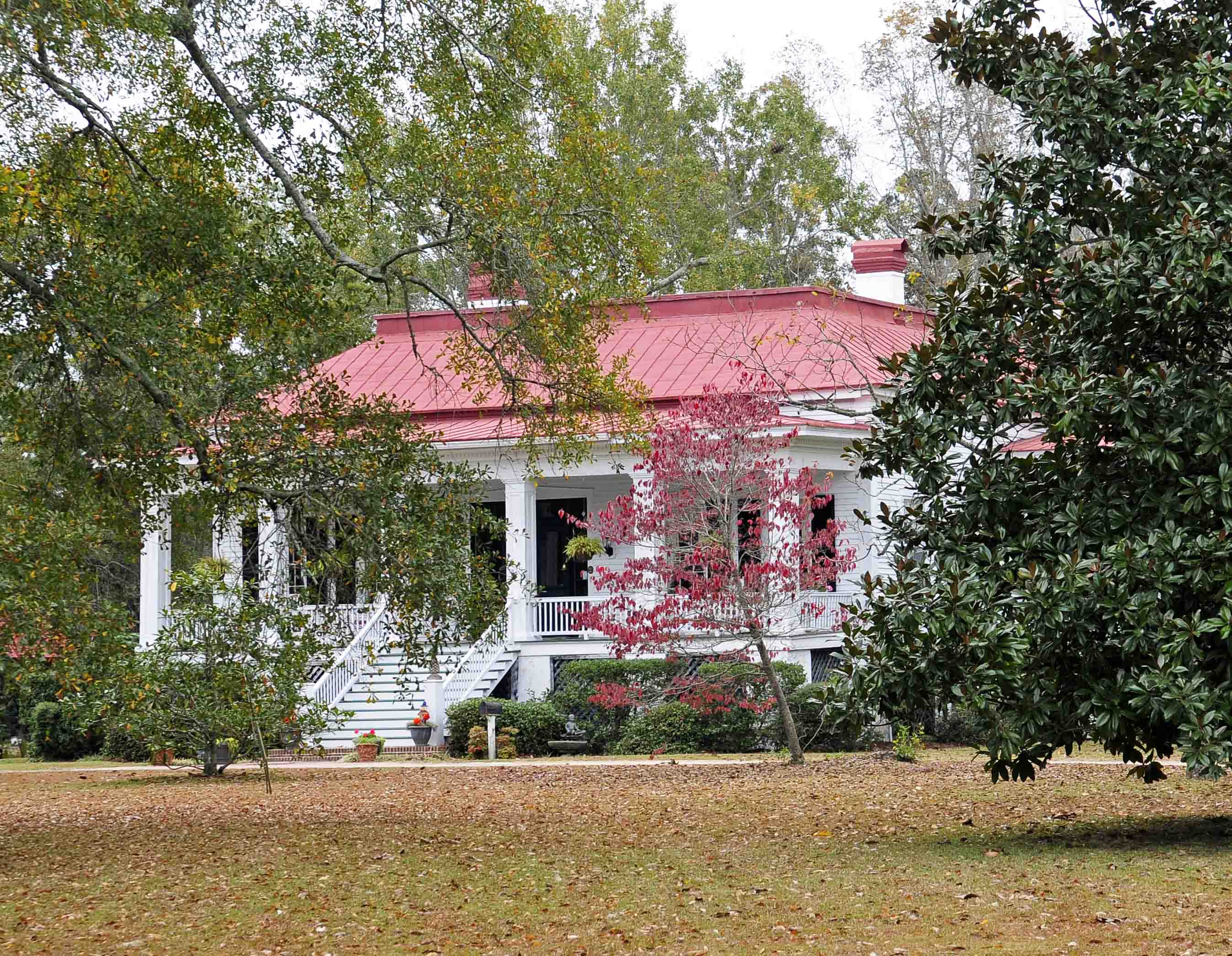
- Col. Olin M Dantzler House, November 2012

- Location within South Carolina Location within the United States
- Location: 412 E. Bridge St., St. Matthews, South Carolina
- Coordinates: 33°39′41.7″N 80°46′26.5″W
- Area: 5 acres (2.0 ha)
- Built: c. 1852
- NRHP reference No.: 73001680
- Added to NRHP: March 30, 1973

Col. Olin M. Dantzler House, also known as Crutchfield House, is a historic home located at St. Matthews, Calhoun County, South Carolina. It was built about 1852, as a one-story, rectangular, raised cottage with truncated, hipped roof. Also on the property are a barn, several sheds, visitors’ cottage and a pigeon house. It was originally used as a seasonal residence for the Jacob M. Dantzler family of Orangeburg County. The house is the oldest standing residence in St. Matthews.

It was listed in the National Register of Historic Places in 1973.
