= Sandy Run, South Carolina =

Unincorporated community in South Carolina, US

Coordinates: 33°48′00″N 80°57′50″W

Sandy Run is an unincorporated community in Calhoun County, South Carolina, United States. Its elevation is 154 feet (47 m). Sandy Run is best known for hosting the United States Marine Corps semi-annual Mud Run. Sandy Run is named after a local stream, Sandy Run, which flows through Sandy Run and neighboring communities, Gaston and Swansea which flows into the Congaree River. Those who live in Sandy Run have a Gaston or Swansea address.

The William Baker House was listed in the National Register of Historic Places in 1978. William T. Sherman may have slept there in February 1865.

Sandy Run is home of the USMC Mud Run, held annually.

== Economy ==
Sandy Run is home to many large corporations such as DAK Americas, Eastman Chemical, Starbucks, Devro Inc., Stier Supply and Fitts Company. It is also home to a local and fast growing ammunition manufacturing company, Sandy Run Arms & Ammo.

Sandy Run has in its core several small local businesses including Sandy Run Exterminating, Sandy Run Florist, Katie's Sandwich Shop, and Sprinkles & Splits.

== Development ==
Recently (May, 2019) Sandy Run has gone through a major development overhaul. A feasibility study outlined 3 possible scenarios for future land development. As of November, 2019 most of the construction has been completed, which includes road improvements, zoning, and the construction of several factories.

== Transportation ==
During lane reversals (during Hurricane evacuations) Sandy Run sees detour traffic from the busy interstate I-26.

== Notable residents ==
- Fritz Furtick, football player
