= Puritan Farm =

Historic house in South Carolina, United States

- U.S. National Register of Historic Places
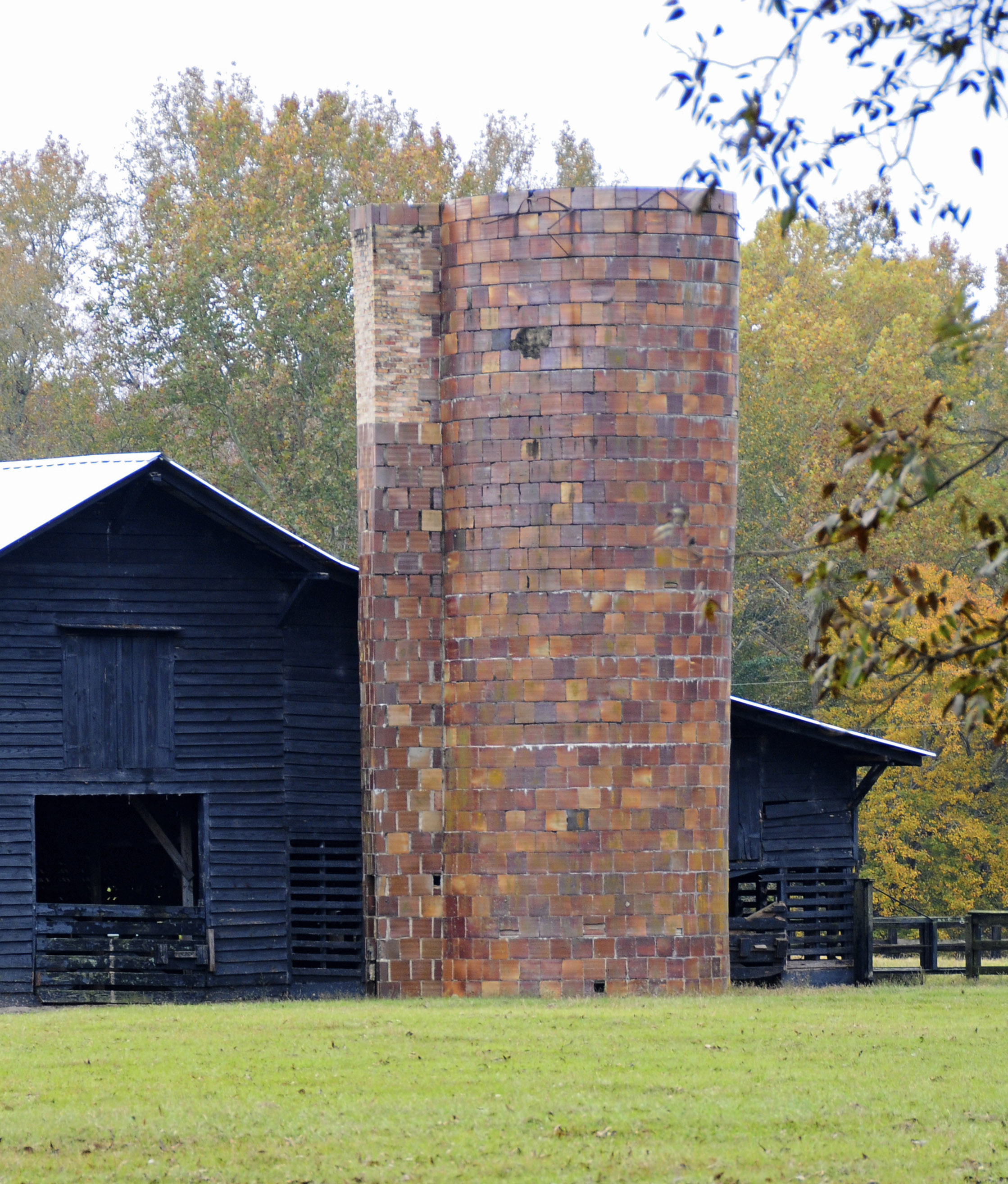
- Silo at Puritan Farm, November 2012

- Location within South Carolina Location within the United States
- Location: West of St. Matthews, near St. Matthews, South Carolina
- Coordinates: 33°39′48″N 80°48′56″W
- Area: 6 acres (2.4 ha)
- Built: 1820-1825
- NRHP reference No.: 74001829
- Added to NRHP: July 25, 1974

Puritan Farm, also known as Keitt-Whaley-Pearlstine House, is a historic plantation house located near St. Matthews, Calhoun County, South Carolina. It was built between 1820 and 1825, and is a large white two-story clapboard frame I-house. It has a pedimented second floor porch addition, two connecting rear wings, and a full-width front porch with six square columns. The main block of the house is one-room deep with a central hall on each floor. The house was the residence of Congressman Laurence M. Keitt, a leader of the South Carolina secessionist movement. Keitt was born in this house in 1824 and maintained it as his residence until his death in 1864.

It was listed in the National Register of Historic Places in 1974.
