= Prehistoric Indian Village =

Archaeological site in South Carolina, United States

- U.S. National Register of Historic Places
- Nearest city: St. Matthews, South Carolina
- Area: 8 acres (3.2 ha)
- NRHP reference No.: 74001828
- Added to NRHP: July 30, 1974

Prehistoric Indian Village, also known as Arant's Field, is a historic archaeological site located near St. Matthews, Calhoun County, South Carolina. This site was occupied in the Archaic Period, probably by small groups of hunter-gatherers. During the first millennium AD, a large agricultural community was situated in the area, with a tentative date of occupation of ca. 500 AD.

It was listed in the National Register of Historic Places in 1974.
