= Buyck's Bluff Archeological Site =

Archaeological site in South Carolina, United States

- U.S. National Register of Historic Places
- Nearest city: St. Matthews, South Carolina
- Area: 7 acres (2.8 ha)
- NRHP reference No.: 79002376
- Added to NRHP: May 4, 1979

Buyck's Bluff Archeological Site is a historic archaeological site located near St. Matthews, Calhoun County, South Carolina. The site contains evidence of human occupation beginning with Paleo-Indian, continuing through the Archaic and Woodland Periods. It probably served as a base camp through most of its occupation.

It was listed in the National Register of Historic Places in 1979.
