= David Houser House =

Historic house in South Carolina, United States

- U.S. National Register of Historic Places
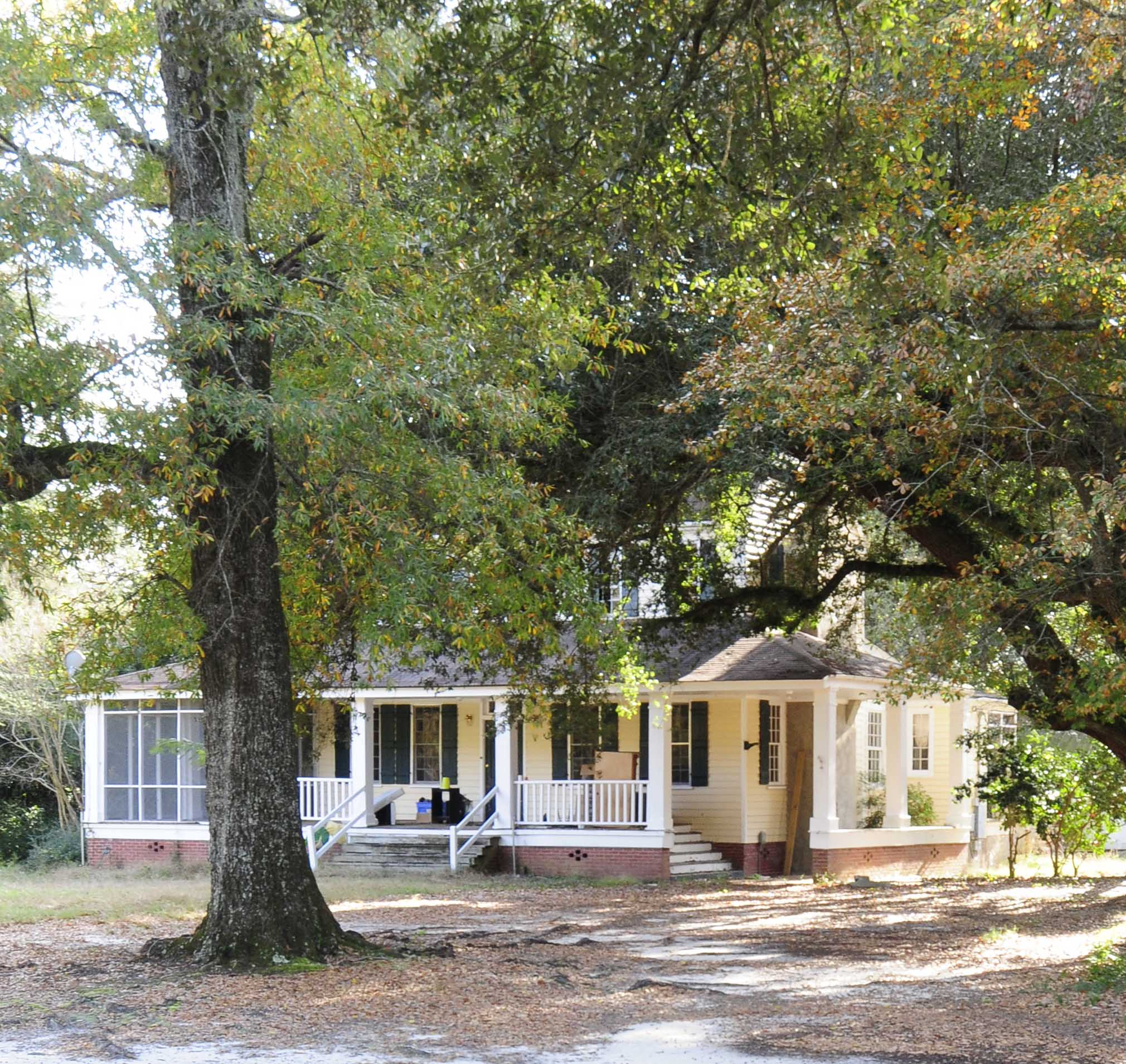
- David Houser House, November 2012

- Location within South Carolina Location within the United States
- Location: West of St. Matthews on U.S. Route 176, near St. Matthews, South Carolina
- Coordinates: 33°40′37″N 80°50′8″W
- Area: 7 acres (2.8 ha)
- Built: 1829
- Architectural style: Federal
- NRHP reference No.: 80003656
- Added to NRHP: November 25, 1980

David Houser House, also known as Oak Grove, is a historic home located near St. Matthews, Calhoun County, South Carolina, United States. It was built in 1829, and is a two-story, rectangular wood frame I-house with a gable roof and stuccoed brick chimney. It has a one-story front porch and rear addition. Also on the property are the original smokehouse, a part of the 19th century Dutch oven, a frame building believed to have once been bedrooms attached to the rear of the house, a barn, a servant's house, a workshop, and the family cemetery where David Houser is buried.

It was listed in the National Register of Historic Places in 1980.
