= Othniel Wienges =

American politician

Othniel Henry Wienges, Jr.
- Born: December 27, 1924; Calhoun County, South Carolina, U.S.
- Died: April 2, 2013 (aged 88); St. Matthews, South Carolina, U.S.
- Education: University of South Carolina
- Occupations: Thoroughbred horse breeder, politician
- Known for: 13-time South Carolina Breeder of the Year; member of the South Carolina House of Representatives (1962–1972)
- Spouse: Carolyn "Callie" Phillips
- Children: 2

Othniel Henry Wienges, Jr. (December 27, 1924 – April 2, 2013) was an American Thoroughbred horse breeder and politician in South Carolina. He won numerous state and industry honors in breeding. After establishing prominence in the industry, Wienges entered politics, being elected as a Democrat to the state House of Representatives in 1962 and serving several terms until 1972.

== Early life ==
Born in Calhoun County, South Carolina in 1924 and named for his father, Wienges grew up in St. Matthews, South Carolina, on the Singleton Plantation, which his grandfather had acquired in the late 19th century. He learned horse breeding with his father, who first raised Standardbreds (used for trotting and pacing races), shifting to Thoroughbreds in the mid-20th century, which specialize in flat racing.

Wienges served in the United States Navy during World War II. Afterward he returned to college, graduating from the University of South Carolina.

== Career ==
Wienges became a horse breeder and took over his family plantation in St. Matthews, South Carolina, operating as O.H. Wienges & Son. He expanded it to about 2600 acres, and specialized in Thoroughbred horses used for racing. He was active in the industry in the state for decades and raced his horses along the East Coast. His most successful stallion was the Mr. Prospector horse Kokand, which "sired progeny who {sic} have earned more than $14 million and 10 stakes winners, including half-million dollar earner Big Rut." Wienges was also active in numerous agricultural and other civic organizations in South Carolina, several related to his alma mater, the state university.

Wienges entered politics, joining the Democratic Party. He was first elected to the local school board, and later to the South Carolina House of Representatives in 1962. He was reelected to several terms, serving to 1972.

== Personal life ==
He married Carolyn "Callie" Phillips (January 21, 1927 - February 3, 2016). Together they had two children, Carol and John.

== Legacy and honors ==
- Wienges was chosen 13 times as "South Carolina Breeder of the Year" by the national Thoroughbred Owners and Breeders Association.
- The South Carolina Owners and Breeders Association named its annual award after Wienges, who was the first recipient.
- In 1974 he was presented the "Man of the Year Award in New England Racing" by the Northeastern Sportswriters Association.
