= Col. J.A. Banks House =

Historic house in South Carolina, United States

- Col. J. A. Banks House
- U.S. National Register of Historic Places
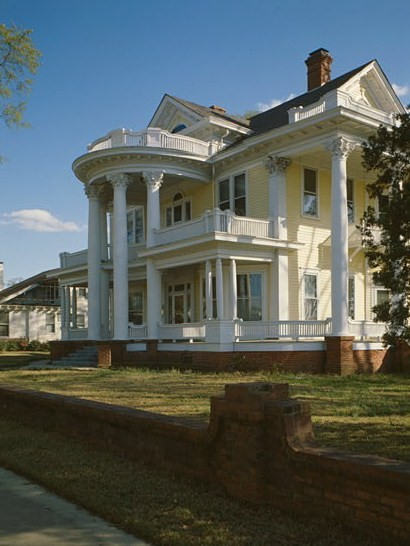
- Col. J. A. Banks House, HABS Photo, April 1987

- Location within South Carolina Location within the United States
- Location: 104 Dantzler St., St. Matthews, South Carolina
- Coordinates: 33°39′45″N 80°46′42″W
- Area: 1.3 acres (0.53 ha)
- Built: c. 1893, 1909-1910
- Architectural style: Colonial
- NRHP reference No.: 80003655
- Added to NRHP: November 24, 1980

Col. J. A. Banks House is a historic home located at St. Matthews, Calhoun County, South Carolina. It was built about 1893, and remodeled in 1909–1910. It is a two-story, asymmetrical plan dwelling that incorporates both Classical and Victorian elements. The house features two Neo-Classical colossal Corinthian order porticos and gable pediments with Palladian windows. Also on the property are two one-story, weatherboarded contributing outbuildings: a fowl house and a workshop. It was the home of South Carolina State Representative and State Senator Col. J. A. Banks.

It was listed in the National Register of Historic Places in 1980.
