= Congaree Bluffs Heritage Preserve =

Protected area in South Carolina, United States

Coordinates: 33.755°N 80.708°W

Congaree Bluffs Heritage Preserve is a nature preserve in the US state of South Carolina. It is managed by the South Carolina Department of Natural Resources. It covers 201 acres of Atlantic Plain land in Calhoun County. It was established in 2001.

Four forest types are found in this preserve. The upland south of the bluffs has been planted to longleaf pine. There also is an oak-hickory association. The bluffs support an undisturbed hardwood forest with more than 100 species of woody plants, of which American beech is among the most prominent. At the base of the bluffs, a bottomland hardwood forest grows.

Throughout the preserve, acidic soils dominate. The bluffs are mostly underlain by soils of the Ailey and Vancluse series. They have loamy sand topsoils and sandy clay loam layers at depth. These soils are also common in the upland part, but there are also very deep, dry fine sands of the Troup and Alpin series -- the latter is especially dry because it does not have a clay-rich subsoil.
