= William Baker House =

Historic house in South Carolina, United States

- U.S. National Register of Historic Places
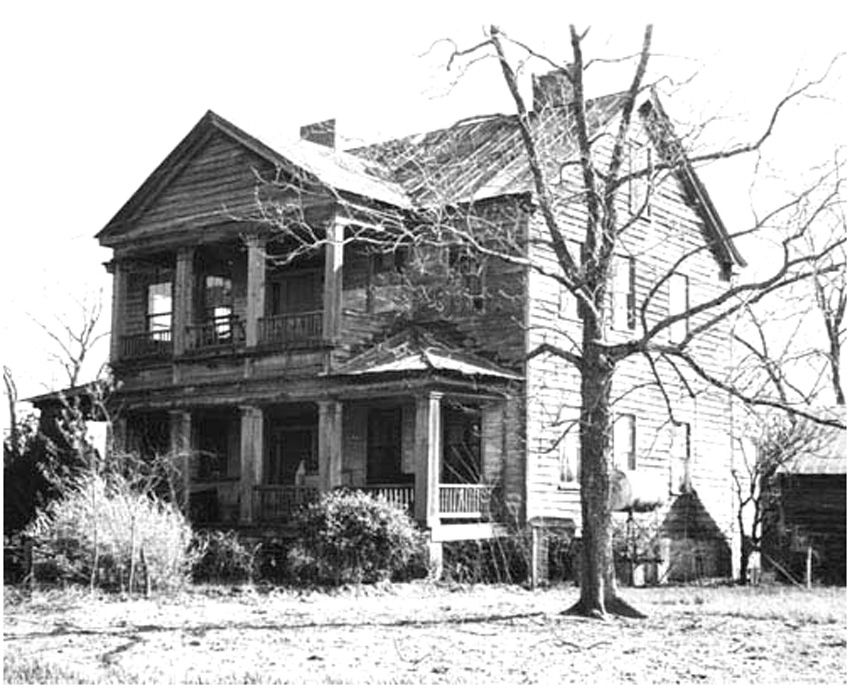
- The house in 1978

- Location within South Carolina Location within the United States
- Location: Sandy Run on Hwy 176, Sandy Run, South Carolina
- Coordinates: 33°49′50″N 80°59′46″W
- Area: 6 acres (2.4 ha)
- Built: c. 1830
- Architectural style: Classical Revival
- NRHP reference No.: 78002494
- Added to NRHP: March 8, 1978

William Baker House is a historic home located in Sandy Run, Calhoun County, South Carolina. It was built about 1830, and is a two-story, Classical Revival style frame structure on a high basement. The house features a full-length hipped-roof verandah with a center balcony with pediment. The interior walls feature wainscoting and doors that are marbleized, using the technique of featherpainting. Also on the property are a contributing wooden outbuilding and family cemetery.

It was listed in the National Register of Historic Places in 1978.
