= Farmfield Plantation House =

Historic house in South Carolina, United States

- U.S. National Register of Historic Places
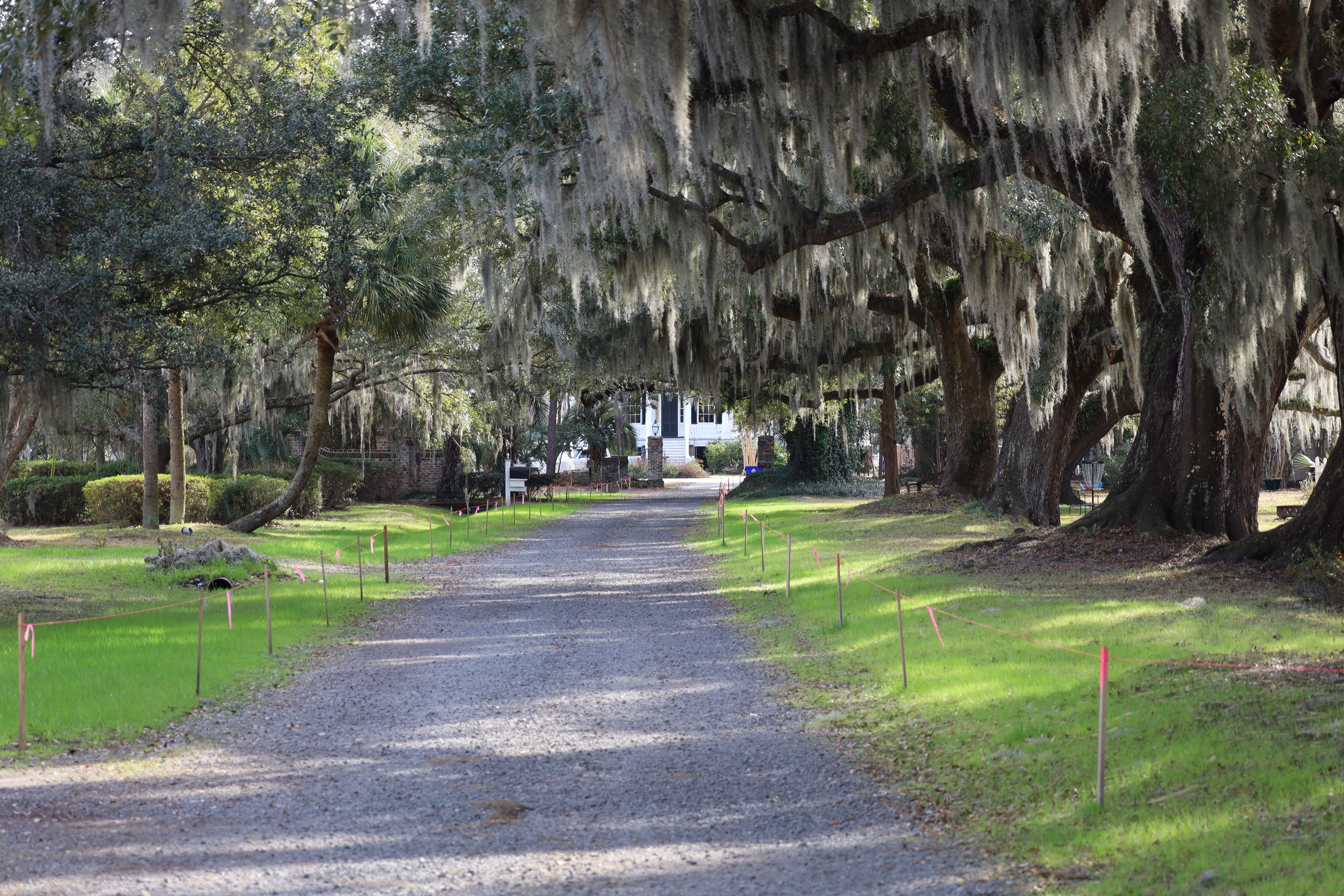
- View towards the house in 2021

- Location within South Carolina Location within the United States
- Location: 1 Farmfield Rd., Charleston, South Carolina
- Coordinates: 32°46′30″N 79°59′36″W
- Area: 6.84 acres (2.77 ha)
- Built: 1854
- Architectural style: Greek Revival
- NRHP reference No.: 82001517
- Added to NRHP: 1982

Farmfield Plantation House was built in 1854 for William Ravenel, a prominent Charleston businessman and banker. It is one of the few plantation houses with unaltered exteriors in St. Andrew's Parish which survived the American Civil War. The interior has been modified.

Farmfield Plantation once included most of the property between U.S. Highway 17 and Folly Road, but most of it has been subdivided. Its construction was described by Rose Pringle Ravenel, the daughter of the builder, in her book Piazza Tales. Today, the house is surrounded on three sides by suburban development. In 2002, an easement to the Lowcountry Open Land Trust was placed on the remaining six acres to ensure no further subdivisions.

The house was listed in the National Register of Historic Places on October 29, 1982.
