= Cherokee Path =

- Cherokee Path, Sterling Land Grant
- U.S. National Register of Historic Places
- Location within South Carolina Location within the United States
- Location: 5 miles southeast of St. Matthews on South Carolina Highway 6, St. Matthews, South Carolina
- Coordinates: 33°38′11″N 80°42′28″W
- Area: 2 acres (0.81 ha)
- NRHP reference No.: 76001696
- Added to NRHP: May 13, 1976

The Cherokee Path (or Keowee path) was the primary route of English and Scots traders from Charleston to Columbia, South Carolina in Colonial America. It was the way they reached Cherokee towns and territories along the upper Keowee River and its tributaries. In its lower section it was known as the Savannah River. They referred to these towns along the Keowee and Tugaloo rivers (in modern Georgia) as the Lower Towns, in contrast to the Middle Towns in Western North Carolina and the Overhill Towns in present-day southeastern Tennessee west of the Appalachian Mountains.

== History ==
In the 17th and 18th centuries, the Cherokee Path was used by English and Scots traders based in Charles Town.

The path was mapped in 1730 by George Hunter, the Surveyor-General of the Province of South Carolina. He noted that it ran 145 miles (233 km) from Charlestown to the Congarees, a fort at the confluence of the Saluda and Broad rivers. (This site later was designated as the state capital and named Columbia.) The Path continued across the western frontier to the colonial settlement of Ninety Six, indicated on the map by the number "96". The British constructed Fort Prince George near Cherokee Country.

It was a total of 302 miles (486 km) from Charlestown to Keowee, the principal Cherokee town of what the colonists called the Lower Towns along the Keowee River and its tributaries (in present-day Oconee, Greenville, Pickens and Anderson counties), which extended into northeastern Georgia.

Later colonists developed a wagon road, called the Indian Trail (taken from the Cherokee Trail), that extended to near Orangeburg. In the 20th century, SC 3 was constructed, following much of this path to Monetta, South Carolina before going to Ninety Six. Remnants of both these original pathways are visible in many places to the side of the nearby modern roads that parallel them.

From Keowee, one path branched southwest into the Unaka Mountains, usually following the streams and valleys where Cherokee towns were located along the Keowee and Tugaloo rivers, to Clayton, Georgia. The main path continued to the Cherokee Middle Towns along the upper Little Tennessee River and its tributaries, where the later European-American settlements of Franklin and Murphy developed in North Carolina). Traders continued across the Appalachian Mountains to what were known as the Overhill Towns in eastern Tennessee, along the lower Little Tennessee and Tellico rivers.

During the French and Indian War, the British built Fort Loudoun, in 1756 at the confluence of the Tellico River and the lower Little Tennessee River, in present-day Monroe County, southeastern Tennessee. It was part of British support for the Cherokee, who were their allies for a period. But by 1760 there were armed confrontations between the two groups, and the Cherokee suffered some defeats. They sued for peace, and in 1762 Henry Timberlakes conducted a peace expedition to the Overhill Towns. was re-established in 1762.

During the American Revolution, the Cherokee Path was used as a military road by rebel militia raised by the states of Virginia, North and South Carolina, and Georgia against the Cherokee, who had raided numerous frontier settlements in June 1776. In the fall of 1776 the groups of Rutherford's Light Horse expedition invaded the Cherokee towns throughout the region, attacking and destroying many towns in all three geographic groups. They were trying to suppress Cherokee warriors. During the Revolution, the Cherokee were allied with the British Loyalists, hoping to push the rebels out of their territory.

== Cherokee Path, Sterling Land Grant ==
The Cherokee Path, Sterling Land Grant is a section of the historic path located near St. Matthews, Calhoun County, South Carolina. In 1704, George Sterling received a proprietary land grant for 570 acres of land along Ox Creek, later called Lyon's Creek. He was one of the area's first European-American settlers in what was organized as the Orangeburg District and later Calhoun County. His family's plantation was often a stopping place for traders and other travelers along the Cherokee Path. Calhoun County is one of the few counties in South Carolina where portions of the original path remain visible. The site of the grant is a deserted, overgrown field dotted with scattered trees. Two acres, crossed by the Cherokee Path, is the portion of the Sterling Land Grant listed on the National Register of Historic Places in 1976.

== Present-day ==
South Carolina Highway 11 (the Cherokee Foothills Scenic Highway) was constructed along or near some of the original path.

== See also ==
- Cherokee history
- Trading Path
