= Salters Plantation House =

Historic house in South Carolina, United States

- U.S. National Register of Historic Places
- Location within South Carolina Location within the United States
- Location: Gapway Road, Salters, South Carolina
- Coordinates: 33°36′01″N 79°51′18″W
- Built: by 1833
- Architectural style: Greek Revival
- NRHP reference No.: 00000591
- Added to NRHP: June 2, 2000

The Salters Plantation House is a house in Williamsburg County, South Carolina. The building has been cited by the National Register Sites in South Carolina as an "important example" of domestic architecture from the 19th century that combined architectural trends from local, regional and national regions.

William Salters constructed the building just before he died in 1833 and it has been improved on several occasions. The influence in the Greek Revival coexists minutely with its symmetrical I-house pattern. The front "rain porch" is a regional feature. Outbuildings are located behind the main house. The house was constructed for a citizen who gained success as a planter and was an important resident of Williamsburg District in its first years. It was added to the United States National Register of Historic Places on June 2, 2000.
