= Annandale Plantation (Georgetown County, South Carolina) =

Historic house in South Carolina, United States

- Annandale Plantation (Millbrook)
- U.S. National Register of Historic Places
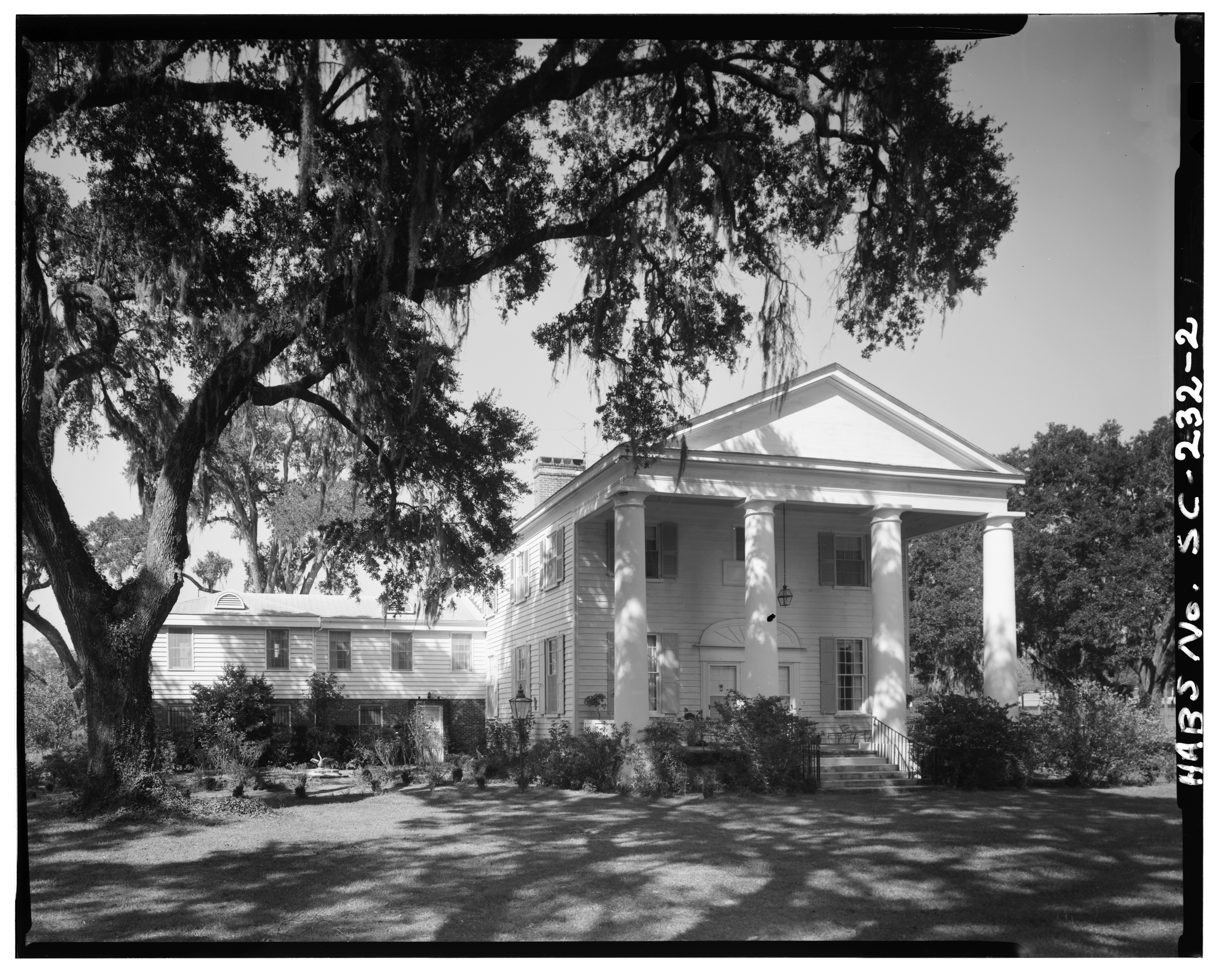
- Annandale Plantation House — front facade (c. 1930s)

- Location within South Carolina Location within the United States
- Location: 14 miles (23 km) south of Georgetown, between South Carolina Highways 18 and 30, in Georgetown County, South Carolina.
- Coordinates: 33°13′01″N 79°18′10″W
- Area: 14 acres (5.7 ha)
- Built: c. 1833, c. 1880, 1966
- Built by: Johnstone, Andrew
- Architectural style: Greek Revival
- NRHP reference No.: 73001709
- Added to NRHP: October 25, 1973

Annandale Plantation, originally known as Millbrook, is a historic plantation house located near Georgetown, in Georgetown County, South Carolina.

== History ==
First called Millbrook, the Annandale plantation was developed beginning in the 1790s by Andrew Johnston, son of a planter in the county.

The main house was built by his grandson and namesake Andrew Johnston (1805-1864) about 1833. He changed the spelling of his surname to "Johnstone" and renamed the plantation as Annandale, honoring their ancestral birthplace in Scotland.

The house is a two-story, Greek Revival style residence. It has a Tuscan order- inspired portico. its most notable architectural features are the details around the windows. A rear addition was added about 1880, and well-integrated into the design. A north wing was added in 1966.

George Alfred Trenholm bought the property in 1863; he served as Treasurer of the Confederate States of America (June 18, 1864 – April 7, 1865). He also served in the state legislature. His son-in-law sold the plantation in 1898 to the Santee Rice Company. It sold the property to Wayne Darlington in 1911. In 1919 after World War I, the Reeves family of North Carolina bought it, and were still owners in 1973, when the property was listed on the National Register of Historic Places. They renovated it.

The Annandale property includes two outbuildings, of the many that would have originally served the plantation. A single surviving slave cabin, likely used by African-American workers after emancipation, has been converted into a recreation building. The plantation doctor's house is used as a private residence.

The plantation was the site of the first tide-operated rice mill (c. 1792) constructed in the state. This was an innovation developed by Jonathan Lucas. During the 1850s, this was one of the most prosperous rice plantations in the state, where the owner worked 230 slaves. They produced 900,000 pounds of rice annually.

In 1955, the owners of Annadale successfully sued the South Carolina Public Service Authority for inverse condemnation after the construction of a dam on the Santee River resulted in damage to the property. The case eventually ended up in the South Carolina Supreme Court. The property was listed on the National Register of Historic Places in 1973.

== See also ==
- National Register of Historic Places listings in Georgetown County, South Carolina
