= Calhoun County Courthouse (South Carolina) =

- U.S. National Register of Historic Places
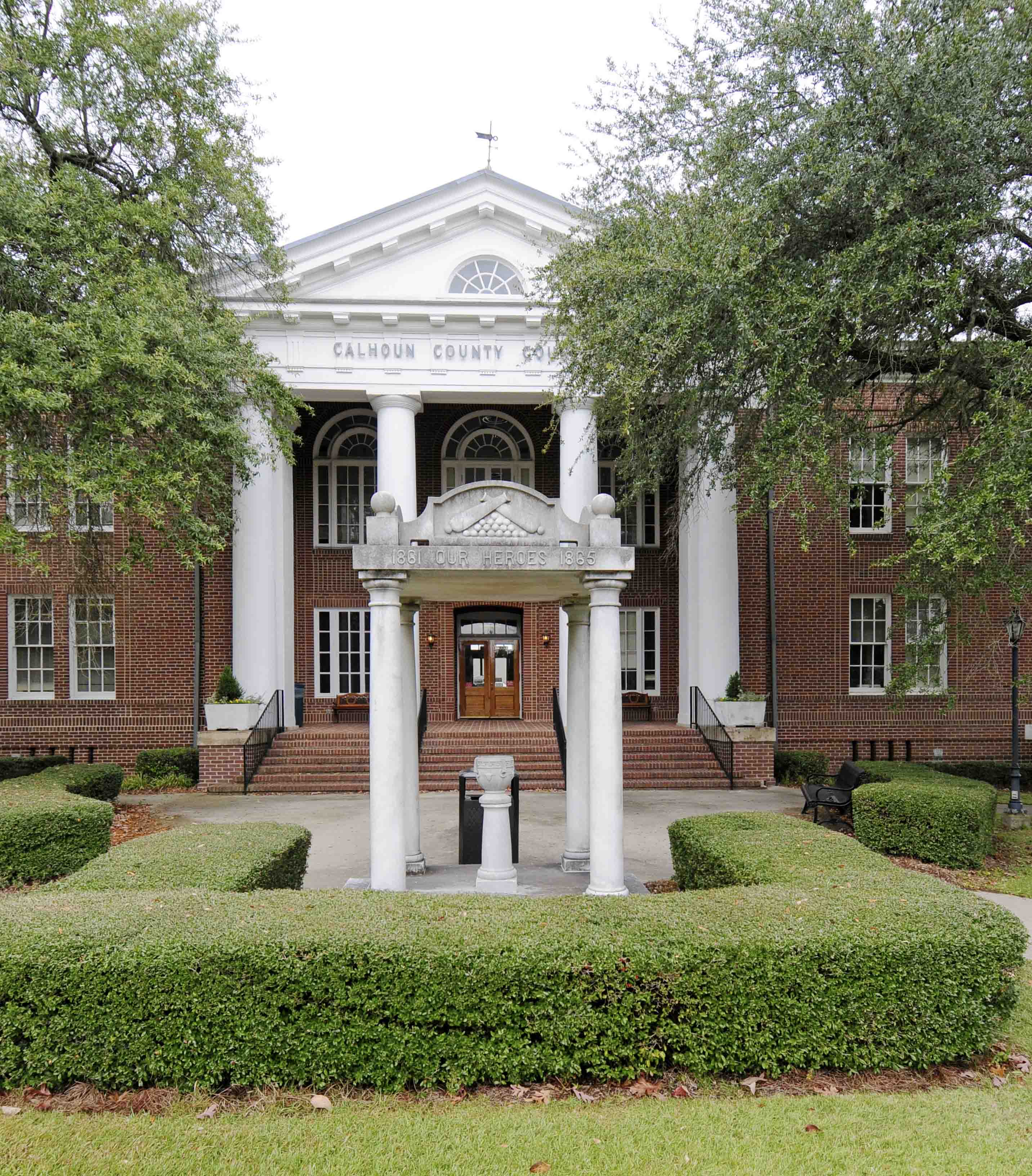

- Location within South Carolina Location within the United States
- Location: 902 F R Huff Dr., St. Matthews, South Carolina
- Coordinates: 33.6634°N 80.7789°W
- Area: 0.8 acres (0.32 ha)
- Built: 1913
- Built by: W.R. Rose
- Architect: William Augustus Edwards
- Architectural style: Colonial Revival
- MPS: Courthouses in South Carolina Designed by William Augustus Edwards TR
- NRHP reference No.: 81000561
- Added to NRHP: October 30, 1981

The Calhoun County Courthouse, built in 1913, is a historic courthouse located in the city of St. Matthews in Calhoun County, South Carolina. It was designed in the Colonial Revival style by Darlington native William Augustus Edwards who designed eight other South Carolina courthouses as well as academic buildings at 12 institutions in Florida, Georgia and South Carolina. Calhoun County was created in 1908 and this is its first and only courthouse. It was listed on the National Register of Historic Places in 1981.

== See also ==
- List of Registered Historic Places in South Carolina
