= Harry L. Ott Jr. =

American politician

Harry Ott

Member of the South Carolina House of Representatives from the 93rd district
- In office 1998 – June 30, 2013
- Preceded by: John Felder
- Succeeded by: Russell Ott

Personal details
- Born: October 2, 1952 (age 74) Orangeburg, South Carolina, U.S.
- Party: Democratic
- Spouse: Linda Ott
- Children: Russell Ott
- Education: Clemson University
- Profession: farmer

Harry L. Ott Jr. (born October 2, 1952) is an American farmer and politician. A member of the Democratic Party, Ott was a member of the South Carolina House of Representatives, representing the 93rd District. He represented the district from 1998 through June 30, 2013. He served as the Minority Leader. Ott resigned to serve in the Farm Service Agency.
