= USS Calhoun County =

US Navy tank landing ship

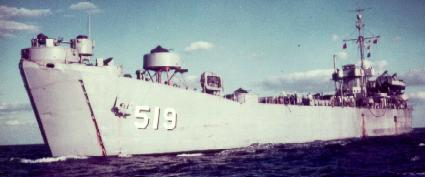
- USS Calhoun County (LST-519)

History

United States
- Name: USS LST-519
- Builder: Chicago Bridge & Iron Company, Seneca, Illinois
- Laid down: 17 September 1943
- Launched: 25 January 1944
- Commissioned: 17 February 1944
- Decommissioned: 1 November 1962
- Renamed: USS Calhoun County (LST-519), 1 July 1955
- Motto: Slow But Sure
- Honours and awards: 2 battle stars (WWII)
- Fate: Sunk as target

General characteristics
- Class & type: LST-491-class tank landing ship
- Displacement: 1,490 long tons (1,514 t) light; 4,080 long tons (4,145 t) full
- Length: 327 ft (100 m)
- Beam: 50 ft (15 m)
- Draft: 8 ft (2.4 m) forward; 14 ft 4 in (4.37 m) aft (full load)
- Propulsion: 2 × diesel engines, two shafts
- Speed: 10.8 knots (20.0 km/h; 12.4 mph)
- Complement: 7 officers, 204 enlisted men
- Armament: 8 × 40 mm guns; 12 × 20 mm guns

USS LST-519 was a LST-491-class tank landing ship built for the US Navy in World War II. It was later renamed USS Calhoun County (LST-519), named after counties in 11 different U.S. states.

LST-519 was built by the Chicago Bridge & Iron Company in Seneca, Illinois. Its keel was laid on September 17, 1943, and it was launched on January 25, 1944. Placed in partial commission status at Seneca on February 8, it proceeded down the Illinois River into the Mississippi River. It later cruised down to the Naval base at Algiers, Louisiana, directly across from New Orleans, where it was fully commissioned on February 17, 1944. A Coast Guard crew trained the LST's Navy crew on this river cruise from Seneca while the ship was en route to Algiers.

== Operational history ==
=== World War II ===
Following shakedown training on the way to Camp Bradford in the Hampton Roads area of Virginia, additional personnel reported aboard for more shakedown training on the Chesapeake Bay. LST-519 departed the United States as part of Convoy UGS-36 for North Africa.

On 1 April 1944, while off Cherchell, Algeria, the convoy was attacked by 30 Ju 88 and Do 214 bombers flying out of Southern France. The ship was not credited with sinking any of these aircraft. At Oran, USS LCT-148, a Landing Craft Tank, was secured to the main deck for transport to England. It arrived at Plymouth on May 11, 1944.

LST-519 received two battle stars in World War II. One for Convoy UGS-36 and the other for the D-Day landing at Juno Beach on June 6, 1944. It was employed in shuttling tanks, other vehicles, supplies, and troops to France. After delivering tanks, trucks, ambulances, railroad cars, ammunition, and other supplies to the beaches of Normandy, Seine River ports, and the other ports of France, LST-519 returned to England with wounded soldiers, damaged equipment and prisoners. Following the collapse of Nazi Germany, LST-519 was attached to the British 226th Section of the 25th Bomb Disposal Company, Corps of Royal Engineers. The primary mission of LST-519, in May 1945, was to dispose of condemned ammunition from Kiel and Hamburg in deep water.

LST-519 made 53 round trips across the English Channel, second only to one other American LST. After hostilities ceased, LST-519 departed Plymouth, England, on July 9, 1945, arriving in Norfolk, Virginia, on July 25, 1945.

=== Post World War II ===
On 5 December 1945, the operational command of LST-519 was transferred from the Amphibious Force to the Service Force. In mid-January 1946, LST-519 was in Guantanamo Bay, Cuba, for the first post-war Atlantic Fleet maneuvers. On the trip from Norfolk, LST-519 transported four LCM landing craft on its main deck, each of which carried an LCVP inside. Present for the occasion were the Missouri (BB-63), Princeton (CV-37), cruisers, destroyers, and fleet auxiliaries. LST-519 was one of several L.S.T.s that served as motherships to small boat crews who operated LCMs and LCVPs as liberty boats for the fleet anchored in the harbor.

Leaving Cuba in mid-February for Searsport, Maine, on the Penobscot Bay, LST-519 had to put in at Boston's Charlestown Navy Yard to repair storm damage suffered in a gale off Cape Hatteras. The ship then proceeded to Searsport for its next assignment. At Searsport, a Liberty ship transloaded over 350 tons of obsolete 1,000- and 500-pound aerial bombs into a newly constructed temporary wooden bin on the main deck of the LST-519. The aerial bombs, along with 5,280 bazooka anti-tank rounds, were dumped about 150 miles offshore, past the continental shelf, with a minimum depth of 1,000 fathoms. At least four such bomb-dumping missions were made before the LST-519 was relieved by three other LSTs. Davisville, Rhode Island, was the next port of call. A tank deck full of steel pontoon cubes was transported to Norfolk Navy Yard, where they were promptly assembled into large pontoon barges as soon as they were unloaded.

On 15 July 1946, the LST-519 was transferred to the Commander, Eastern Sea Frontier, for duty as a disposal vessel of defective and obsolete munitions. Special equipment and bins were installed to facilitate dumping of ordnance, toxic, and nuclear waste at sea. After this, LST-519 operated off the Atlantic and Gulf coasts, disposing of ammunition from naval ammunition depots at Indian Head, MD; Hingham, MA; Yorktown, VA; Charleston, SC; Earle, NJ; Fort Mifflin, PA; New Orleans, LA; and Newport, RI.

In accordance with a Secretary of the Navy directive dated 12 May 1955, LST-519 was renamed USS Calhoun County (LST-519) effective 1 July 1955. LST-519 was the first ship to bear the name, which honors a Calhoun County located in each of 11 states:Alabama, Arkansas, Florida, Georgia, Illinois, Iowa, Michigan, Mississippi, South Carolina, Texas, and West Virginia.

On the morning of 20 June 1956, while dumping condemned ammunition from NAD Charleston, the Calhoun County experienced underwater explosions caused by the detonation of several Torpex-loaded torpedo warheads. Minor hull damage resulted, but there were no personnel casualties. Repairs were made at Savannah, Georgia. From 24 August to 23 October 1956, Calhoun County underwent its regular shipyard overhaul at the Bethlehem Steel Shipyard, Staten Island, New York. Major improvements effected during this period were the installation of a new radar and the renewal of most of the ammunition bins on the main deck. Following its overhaul, Calhoun County reported to Guantanamo Bay, Cuba, for refresher training from 6 to 24 November 1956. The ship received an overall mark of "Good" on its battle problem.

Calhoun County was struck by SS Nellie on 27 June 1959 in the vicinity of Sandy Hook, New Jersey. As the result, the 40 mm gun tub on the port side had to be removed, and the degaussing system was placed out of commission. There were no personnel casualties. During April 1960, Calhoun County operated with TG 7.3 on a scientific mission in the vicinity of Roosevelt Roads Naval Station, Puerto Rico. A shipyard overhaul was completed in September 1960, after which it participated in underway training off the coast of Virginia. In October, the ship was deployed to Naval Station Argentia, Newfoundland, for ammunition disposal. After four disposal trips, this command undertook an amphibious disembarking of an experimental team off the beach of La Poile, Newfoundland. This was followed by a five-day "goodwill" trip to Halifax, Nova Scotia.

From November 1960 to June 1961, the Calhoun County was engaged in routine dumping operations from Boston to Charleston. It was decommissioned on 1 November 1962 after eighteen and a half years of naval service. Only one other L.S.T. of World War II class was in continuous commission longer than the LST-519. Its final duty was as a gunnery target for several warships. However, gunfire failed to sink the ship, so demolition charges were used to carry out the coup de grâce.

== Controversy ==
A 2013 article in the Tampa Bay Times reported allegations that, for 15 years after the close of World War II, Calhoun County was involved in a covert operation to dispose of radioactive toxic waste into the ocean. The operation allegedly led to the deaths of sailors serving aboard during this period from illnesses linked to radiation, and the ship ultimately had to be disposed of by sinking due to radioactivity. The US Navy has denied the allegations.
