= Zante Plantation =

Historic house in South Carolina, United States

- Formerly listed on the U.S. National Register of Historic Places
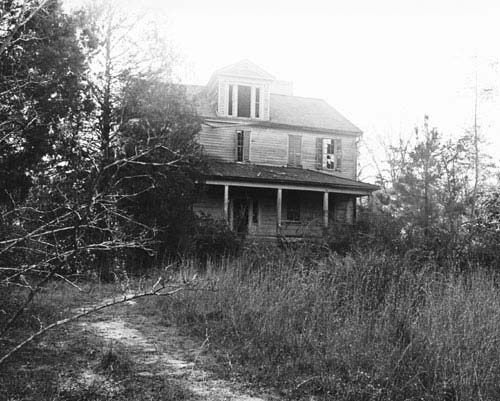

- Location within South Carolina Location within the United States
- Location: Southeast of Fort Motte off South Carolina Highway 601, near Fort Motte, South Carolina
- Coordinates: 33°42′37″N 80°38′32″W
- Area: 4 acres (1.6 ha)
- Built: c. 1815
- NRHP reference No.: 76001695

Significant dates
- Added to NRHP: June 29, 1976
- Removed from NRHP: July 15, 2025

Zante Plantation was a historic plantation house located near Fort Motte, Calhoun County, South Carolina. It was built about 1815, and is a 2 1/2-story frame structure with Federal details. It has a stucco-over-brick foundation approximately 7 feet (2.1 m) high. Both front and rear facades have one-story porches. Several original outbuildings remain on the property. Zante has been the home of several prominent South Carolinians, its history reaching as far back as the late-18th century.

It was in severe disrepair due to neglect and vandalism and was demolished in 2016. It was listed in the National Register of Historic Places in 1976, and was delisted in 2025.
