= Calhoun Academy (South Carolina) =

Location
- 81 Academy Rd; St. Matthews, South Carolina 29135; United States; 33°38′57″N 80°45′48″W

Information
- Type: Private school
- Motto: Small Town Big Dreams
- Established: 1969 (57 years ago)
- CEEB code: 411748
- Headmaster: Becky Haigler
- Grades: K3–12
- Enrollment: 438
- Campus: 10 acres (4.0 ha)
- Colors: Blue and gold
- Athletics conference: South Carolina Independent School Association
- Mascot: Cavalier
- Website: http://www.calhounacademy.org

Calhoun Academy (CA) is a private school located outside of downtown St. Matthews, South Carolina, United States. It was founded in 1969 as a segregation academy.

== History ==
Calhoun Academy was founded on December 30, 1969, as a segregation academy. The school's racially discriminatory charter made it ineligible to operate as a tax-exempt charity organization. In 1985 CA changed its charter to allow non-white students to attend. The school renounced its formal policy banning black students in 1985 and applied for tax-exempt status in 1986. The Internal Revenue Service denied the school's application on the grounds that it had never, to that time, had a black student or teacher. This decision was upheld by the United States Tax Court in 1990.

== Academics ==
Calhoun Academy offers three courses of study: an Academic College Preparatory Diploma, a General College Preparatory Diploma, and a General Basic Diploma.

CA is a member of the South Carolina Independent School Association (SCISA).

== Athletics ==
The academy's athletic program includes football, basketball, softball, baseball, volleyball, soccer, cross country, track, cheerleading, and golf. The Cavaliers' varsity football team were the SCISA Class AA Football Champions in 1978, 2004 and 2015. The varsity baseball team won the AA SCISA Championship in 1979, 2008, 2015, and 2016. The Cavalier varsity girls' basketball team was the 2017 AA SCISA runner-up.
