= Oakland Plantation (Fort Motte, South Carolina) =

Historic house in South Carolina, United States

- U.S. National Register of Historic Places
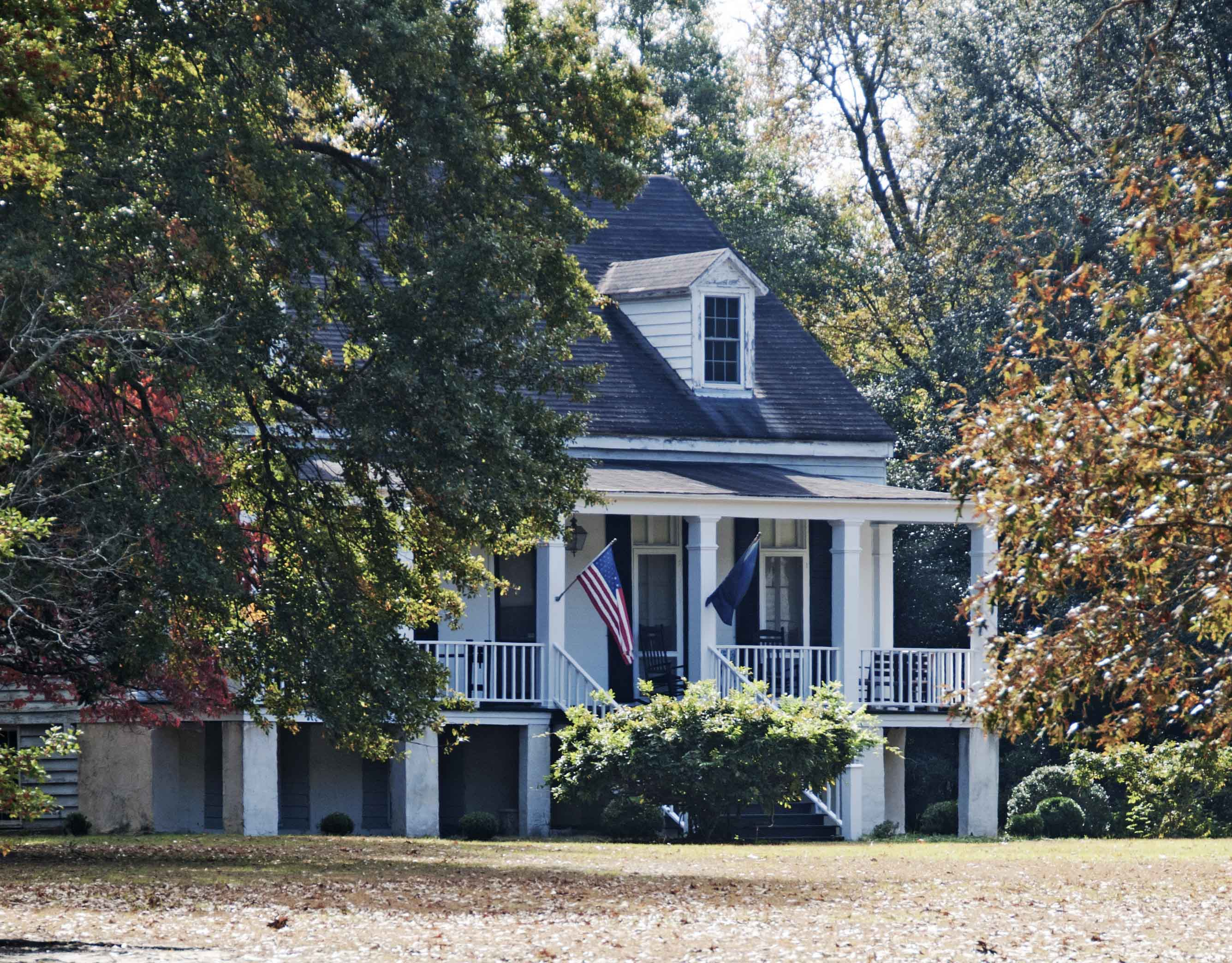
- Oakland Plantation, November 2012

- Location within South Carolina Location within the United States
- Location: South of Fort Motte, near Fort Motte, South Carolina
- Coordinates: 33°41′12″N 80°40′0″W
- Area: 1 acre (0.40 ha)
- Built: c. 1800
- NRHP reference No.: 75001689
- Added to NRHP: May 30, 1975

Oakland Plantation is a historic plantation house located near Fort Motte, Calhoun County, South Carolina. It was built about 1800, and is a 1 1/2-story clapboard house with two flanking wings set back from the façade. The house sits on a brick foundation and has an enclosed basement. It has a front porch, supported by six square columns. Oakland is still surrounded by farmland, and the house and one outbuilding, the original kitchen, are situated on a one-acre lot.

It was listed in the National Register of Historic Places in 1975.
