= Midway Plantation (Fort Motte, South Carolina) =

Historic house in South Carolina, United States

- U.S. National Register of Historic Places
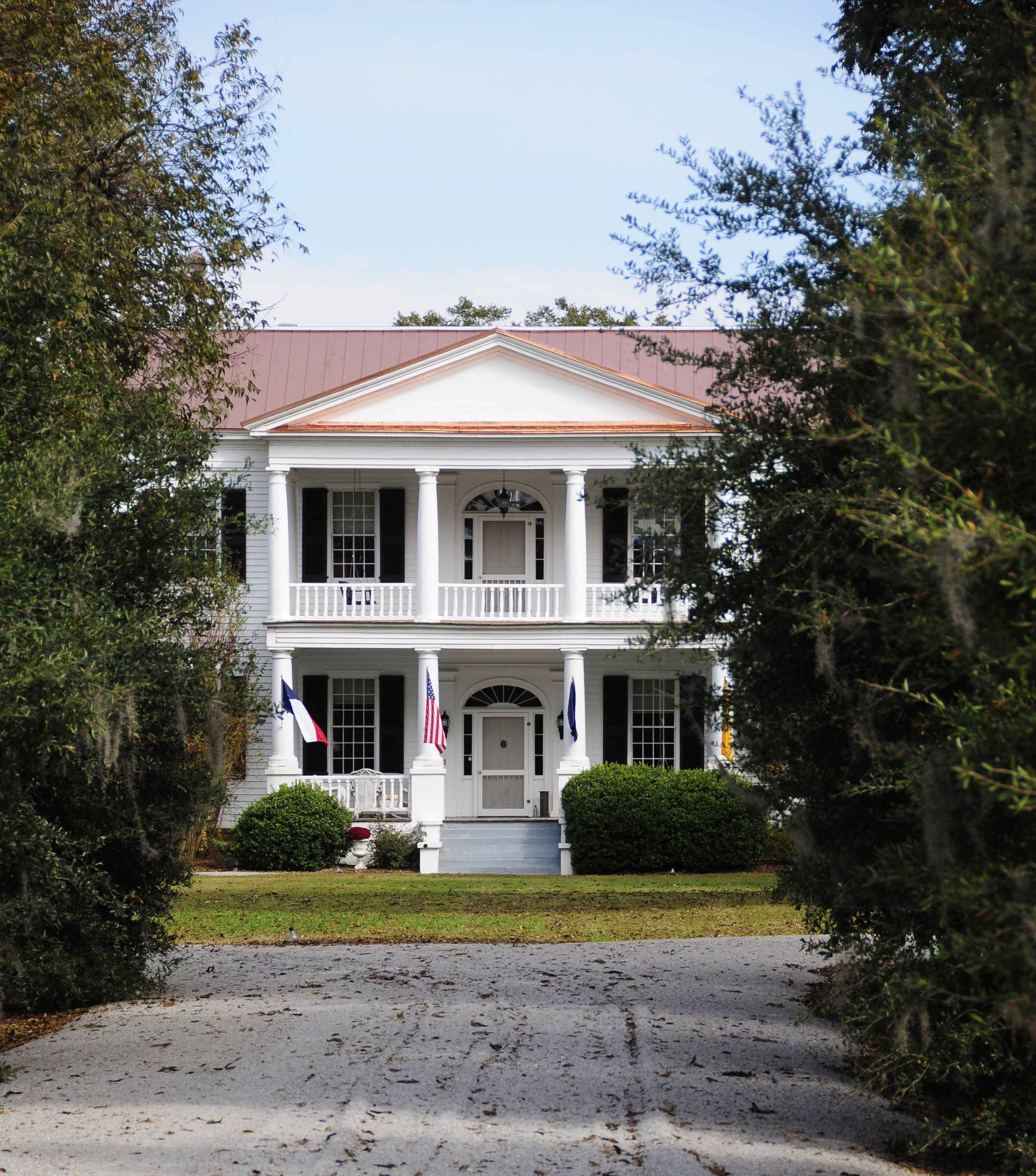
- Midway Plantation, November 2012

- Location within South Carolina Location within the United States
- Location: South of Fort Motte off U.S. Route 601, near Fort Motte, South Carolina
- Coordinates: 33°40′31″N 80°41′39″W
- Area: 1 acre (0.40 ha)
- Built: 1859
- Built by: William Russell Thomson
- Architectural style: Greek Revival, Federal
- NRHP reference No.: 76001694
- Added to NRHP: May 28, 1976

Midway Plantation is a historic plantation house located near Fort Motte, Calhoun County, South Carolina. The original Midway plantation was built about 1785, although little of this structure remains. The present façade was added about 1859, and is a two-story antebellum frame building with both Greek Revival and Federal influences. The front façade features a pediment and a two-tiered portico with four Tuscan order columns on both levels. The rear wing and porch were added around 1900.

It was listed in the National Register of Historic Places in 1976.
