= Calhoun County Library =

- U.S. National Register of Historic Places
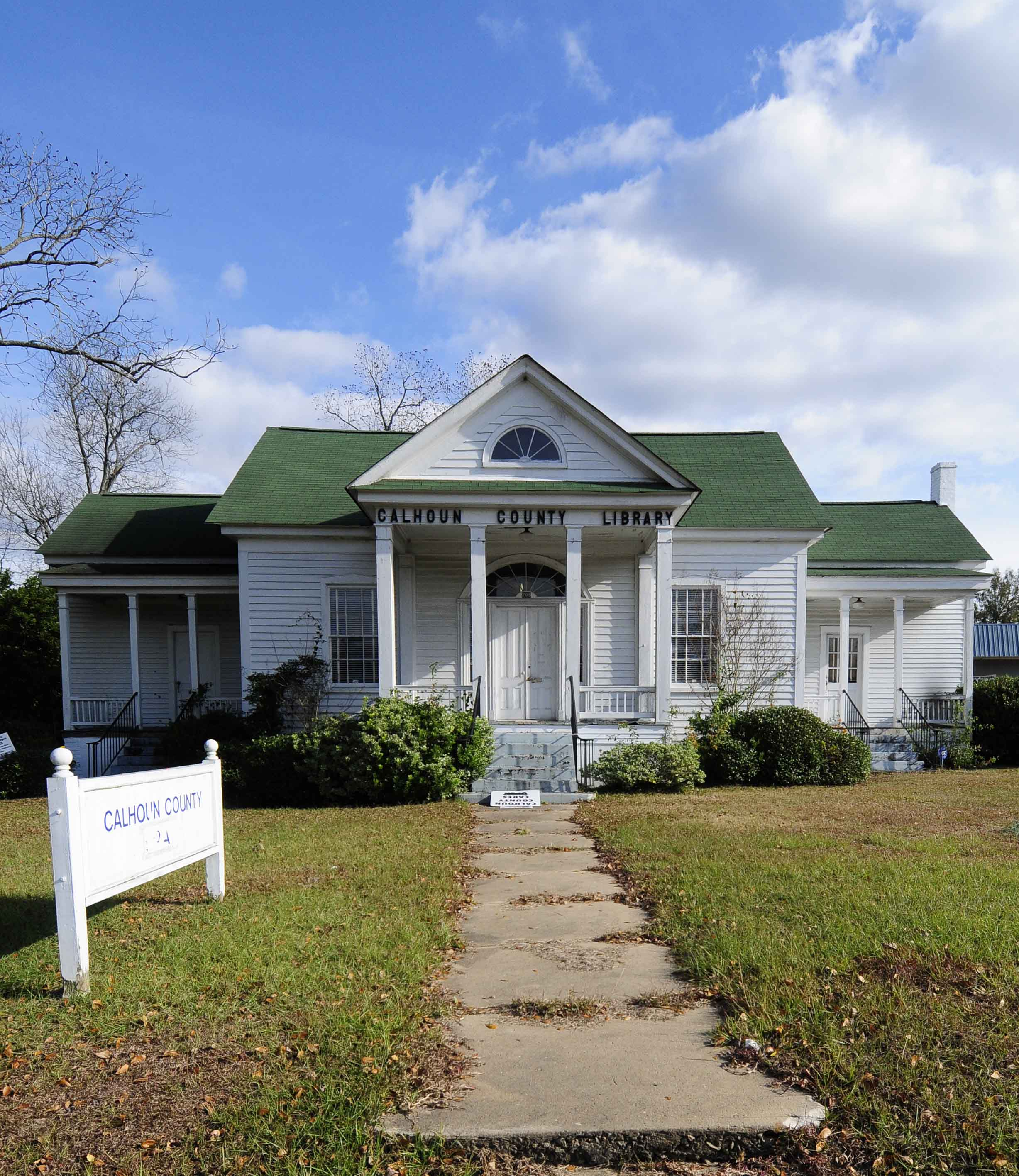
- Calhoun County Library, November 2012

- Location within South Carolina Location within the United States
- Location: Railroad Ave., St. Matthews, South Carolina
- Coordinates: 33°40′1″N 80°46′28″W
- Area: 1 acre (0.40 ha)
- Built: c. 1877, 1949
- Architectural style: Greek Revival
- NRHP reference No.: 75001690
- Added to NRHP: May 29, 1975

Calhoun County Library is a historic library building located at St. Matthews, Calhoun County, South Carolina. It was built about 1877, and is a one-story, medium-gabled white clapboard structure in the Greek Revival style. It was originally built as a residence, but was adapted for use as a county library in 1949. The front façade features a three-bay, square-columned entrance porch, with smaller porches of similar design on the flanking wings. The library is one of St. Matthews' oldest buildings.

It was listed in the National Register of Historic Places in 1975.
