= St. Matthews, South Carolina =

- Town
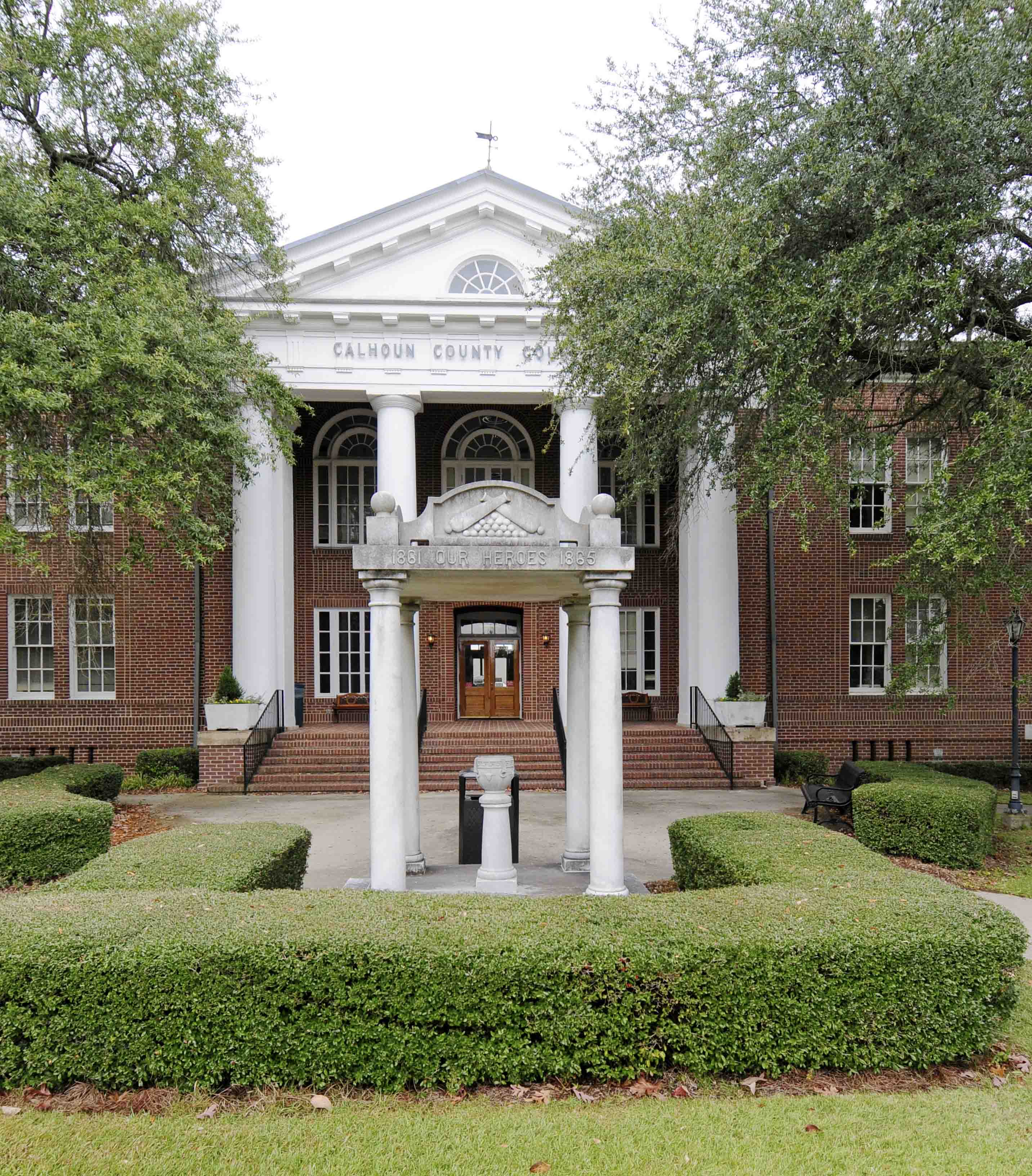
- Calhoun County Courthouse

- Seal

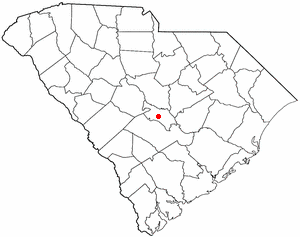
- Location of St. Matthews, South Carolina
- Coordinates: 33°39′51″N 80°46′41″W
- Country: United States
- State: South Carolina
- County: Calhoun
- Founded: 1841

Area
  - Total: 1.93 sq mi (4.99 km^{2})
  - Land: 1.92 sq mi (4.98 km^{2})
  - Water: 0.0077 sq mi (0.02 km^{2})
- Elevation: 282 ft (86 m)

Population (2020)
  - Total: 1,841
  - Density: 958.0/sq mi (369.88/km^{2})
- Time zone: UTC-5 (EST)
  - Summer (DST): UTC-4 (EDT)
- ZIP Code: 29135
- Area code: 803
- FIPS code: 45-62620
- GNIS feature ID: 2407272
- Website: stmatthews.sc.gov

St. Matthews is a town in Calhoun County, South Carolina, United States. The population was 1,841 at the 2020 census, a decline from 2,021 in 2010. It is the county seat of Calhoun County.

St. Matthews is part of the Columbia, South Carolina Metropolitan Statistical Area.

The town holds an annual Purple Martin festival in April which includes food, music, cars, and more.

== History ==
St. Matthews was established as the township of Amelia by Gov. Robert Johnson in the 1730s. The Col. J.A. Banks House, Buyck's Bluff Archeological Site, Calhoun County Courthouse, Calhoun County Library, Cherokee Path, Sterling Land Grant, Col. Olin M. Dantzler House, David Houser House, Prehistoric Indian Village, and Puritan Farm are listed on the National Register of Historic Places.

== Geography ==
St. Matthews is located in the center of Calhoun County. U.S. Route 601 passes through the town, leading northeast 51 miles (82 km) to Camden and southwest 13 miles (21 km) to Orangeburg. South Carolina Highway 6 crosses US 601 in the center of town and leads west 7 miles (11 km) to Interstate 26 and southeast 22 miles (35 km) to Interstate 95 near Santee.

According to the United States Census Bureau, St. Matthews has a total area of 1.93 square miles (4.99 km^{2}), of which 1.92 square miles (4.97 km^{2}) is land and 0.01 square miles (0.02 km^{2}), or 0.35%, is water.

== Education ==
Public education in St. Matthews is administered by Calhoun County School District. The district operates St. Matthews K-8 School, Sandy Run K-8 School, and Calhoun County High School.

Calhoun Academy, a school founded as a segregation academy, remains a private institution.

St. Matthews has a lending library, the Calhoun County Public Library.

St. Matthews is home to the Calhoun County Museum, on Butler Street, which is run and directed by Mrs. Roland. The Museum houses countless artifacts and stories of St. Matthews history and character.

== Notable people ==
- Mike Colter, actor
- Viola Davis, Academy Award-winning actress
- Clarence Felder, actor
- Caleb Ginyard, singer, songwriter
- Alshon Jeffery, Philadelphia Eagles (NFL) and (former) University of South Carolina wide receiver
- Eartha Kitt, singer, actress, dancer and activist
- Ludwig Lewisohn, writer, critic and poet
- Phillip Merling, Miami Dolphins defensive end in the NFL
- Harry L. Ott Jr., South Carolina House Representative
- Horace Ott, musician, orchestral conductor and songwriter
- Russell Ott, South Carolina House Representative and lobbyist
- James "Blood" Ulmer, jazz and blues guitarist
- Othniel Wienges, politician and horse breeder

== Demographics ==
Historical population
Census	Pop.	Note	%±
1880	271		—
1890	524		93.4%
1900	758		44.7%
1910	1,377		81.7%
1920	1,780		29.3%
1930	1,750		−1.7%
1940	2,187		25.0%
1950	2,351		7.5%
1960	2,433		3.5%
1970	2,403		−1.2%
1980	2,496		3.9%
1990	2,345		−6.0%
2000	2,107		−10.1%
2010	2,021		−4.1%
2020	1,841		−8.9%
U.S. Decennial Census

=== 2020 census ===
St. Matthews racial composition
Race	Num.	Perc.
White (non-Hispanic)	655	35.58%
Black or African American (non-Hispanic)	1,068	58.01%
Native American	7	0.38%
Asian	7	0.38%
Other/Mixed	52	2.82%
Hispanic or Latino	52	2.82%

As of the 2020 United States census, there were 1,841 people, 943 households, and 531 families residing in the town.

=== 2000 census ===
As of the census of 2000, there were 2,107 people, 823 households, and 549 families residing in the town. The population density was 1,091.1 inhabitants per square mile (421.3/km^{2}). There were 913 housing units at an average density of 472.8 per square mile (182.5/km^{2}). The racial makeup of the town was 37.16% White, 61.46% African American, 0.05% Native American, 0.09% Asian, 0.14% Pacific Islander, 0.38% from other races, and 0.71% from two or more races. Hispanic or Latino of any race were 1.33% of the population.

There were 823 households, out of which 27.2% had children under the age of 18 living with them, 41.8% were married couples living together, 21.4% had a female householder with no husband present, and 33.2% were non-families. 30.6% of all households were made up of individuals, and 14.9% had someone living alone who was 65 years of age or older. The average household size was 2.39 and the average family size was 3.00.

In the town, the population was spread out, with 23.5% under the age of 18, 6.2% from 18 to 24, 23.3% from 25 to 44, 24.0% from 45 to 64, and 23.0% who were 65 years of age or older. The median age was 43 years. For every 100 females, there were 72.8 males. For every 100 females age 18 and over, there were 66.3 males.

The median income for a household in the town was $24,969, and the median income for a family was $36,250. Males had a median income of $29,760 versus $21,311 for females. The per capita income for the town was $14,911. About 19.5% of families and 24.0% of the population were below the poverty line, including 32.8% of those under age 18 and 21.4% of those age 65 or over.
