= Calhoun County, South Carolina =

County in South Carolina, United States

- County
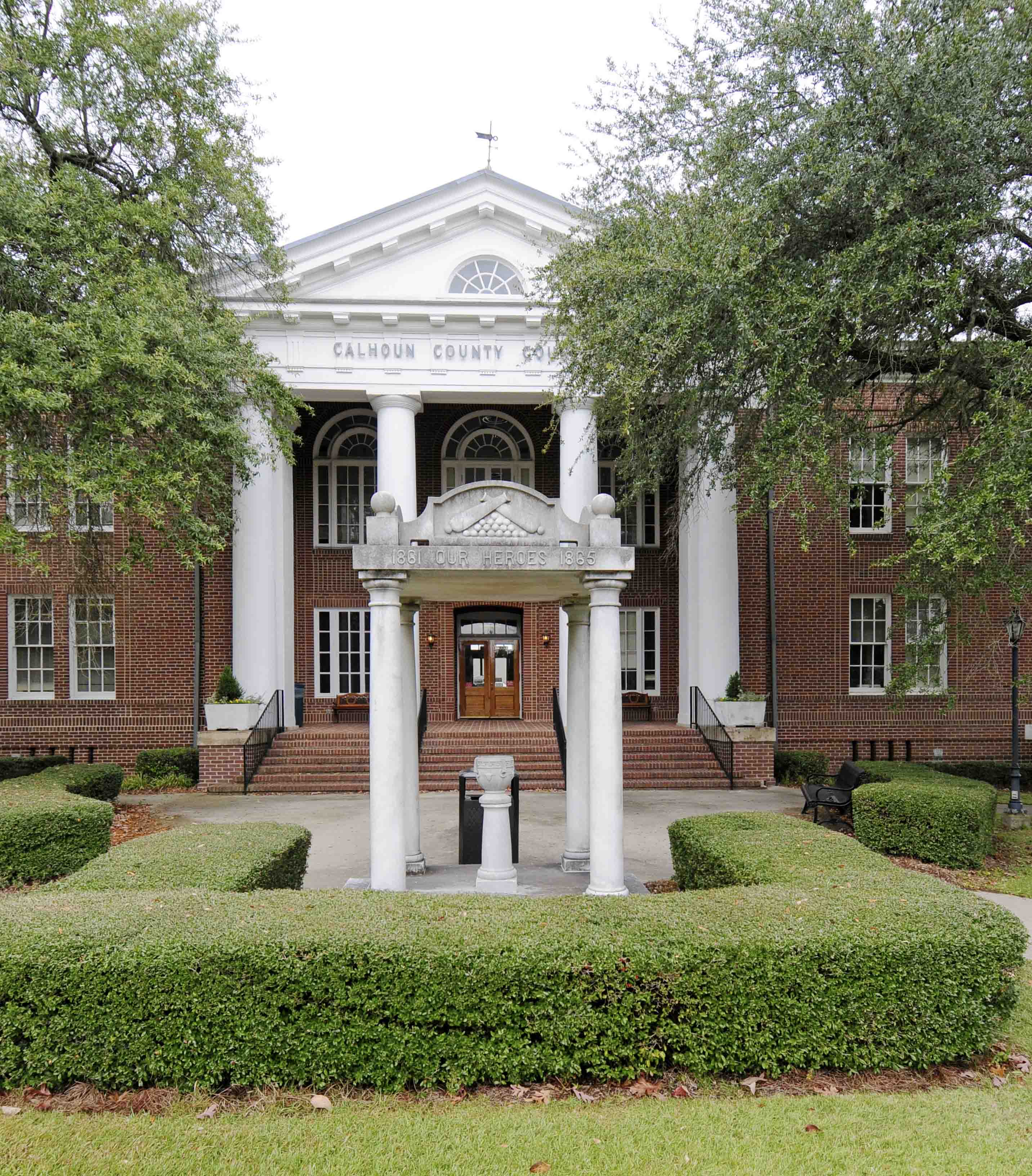
- Calhoun County Courthouse and Confederate Monument

- Flag Seal
- Motto: "In the Heart of South Carolina"
- Location within the U.S. state of South Carolina
- Interactive map of Calhoun County, South Carolina
- Coordinates: 33.67°N 80.78°W
- Country: United States
- State: South Carolina
- Founded: 1908
- Named for: John C. Calhoun
- Seat: St. Matthews
- Largest community: St. Matthews

Area
  - Total: 392.48 sq mi (1,016.5 km^{2})
  - Land: 381.15 sq mi (987.2 km^{2})
  - Water: 11.33 sq mi (29.3 km^{2}) 2.89%

Population (2020)
  - Total: 14,119
  - Estimate (2025): 14,188 ▲
  - Density: 37.043/sq mi (14.302/km^{2})
- Time zone: UTC−5 (Eastern)
  - Summer (DST): UTC−4 (EDT)
- Congressional district: 6th
- Website: calhouncounty.sc.gov

Calhoun County is a county in the U.S. state of South Carolina. As of the 2020 census, its population was 14,119, making it the fourth-least populous county in the state. Its county seat is St. Matthews. In terms of land area, it is also the smallest county in the state.

Located in a rural upland area long devoted to cotton plantations, part of the Black Belt of the South, the county was formed in 1908 from portions of Lexington and Orangeburg counties. It is named for John C. Calhoun, the former U.S. vice-president, Senator, Representative and cabinet member from South Carolina, although Calhoun was from Abbeville, South Carolina.

Calhoun County is part of the Columbia, SC Metropolitan Statistical Area. It has an overall score of 52 including factors health, crime, equity, education, and housing. It is one of 11 counties with the same name in the United States.

== History ==
Calhoun County was home to the Congaree Tribe. As early as 1715, maps show them living in the region. Arrowheads and other artifacts continue to be found in lakes and near rivers.

During the American Revolutionary War, Calhoun County was home to the famous Siege of Fort Motte. The Fort Motte Battle Site is accessible today.

In 2011, an illegal dumping of an estimated 250,000 vehicle tires was discovered in Calhoun County near Elloree. The mound of tires was so large it could reportedly be seen from space. As of December 2014, nothing has been done about the tire dump.

== Geography ==
According to the U.S. Census Bureau, the county has a total area of 392.48 square miles (1,016.5 km^{2}), of which 381.15 square miles (987.2 km^{2}) is land and 11.33 square miles (29.3 km^{2}) (2.89%) is water. It is the second-smallest county in South Carolina by land area and smallest by total area.

Calhoun County includes features such as Lake Marion, and the Congaree Bluffs, accessible publicly via the Congaree Bluffs Heritage Preserve.

Calhoun County borders Congaree National Park, the only Federally recognized Park which is a swamp. Astonishing biodiversity exists in Congaree National Park, the largest intact expanse of old growth bottomland hardwood forest remaining in the southeastern United States. Waters from the Congaree and Wateree Rivers sweep through the floodplain, carrying nutrients and sediments that nourish and rejuvenate this ecosystem and support the growth of national and state champion trees. Although the park lies outside the boundaries of Calhoun County, much of the environment is similar.

The upper boundary for Calhoun County is the Congaree River.

=== State and local protected area ===
- Congaree Bluffs Heritage Preserve

=== Major water bodies ===
- Big Beaver Creek
- Congaree River
- Four Hole Swamp
- Lake Marion
- Little Limestone Creek

=== Adjacent counties ===
- Richland County – north
- Sumter County – northeast
- Clarendon County – east
- Orangeburg County – south
- Lexington County – northwest

=== Major highways ===
- I-26
- US 21
- US 176
- US 601
- SC 6
- SC 33
- SC 172
- SC 267
- SC 419

Calhoun County is part of the evacuation route for hurricanes and coastal flooding. During such times, lane reversals are implemented, where Interstate 26 goes in one direction (northwest).

== Demographics ==
Historical population
| Census | Pop. | Note | %± |
|---|---|---|---|
| 1910 | 16,634 | | — |
| 1920 | 18,384 | | 10.5% |
| 1930 | 16,707 | | −9.1% |
| 1940 | 16,229 | | −2.9% |
| 1950 | 14,753 | | −9.1% |
| 1960 | 12,256 | | −16.9% |
| 1970 | 10,780 | | −12.0% |
| 1980 | 12,206 | | 13.2% |
| 1990 | 12,753 | | 4.5% |
| 2000 | 15,185 | | 19.1% |
| 2010 | 15,175 | | −0.1% |
| 2020 | 14,119 | | −7.0% |
| 2025 (est.) | 14,188 | ▲ | 0.5% |
U.S. Decennial Census; 1790–1960 1900–1990; 1990–2000 2010 2020

=== Racial and ethnic composition ===
Calhoun County, South Carolina – Racial and ethnic composition Note: the US Census treats Hispanic/Latino as an ethnic category. This table excludes Latinos from the racial categories and assigns them to a separate category. Hispanics/Latinos may be of any race.
| Race / Ethnicity (NH = Non-Hispanic) | Pop 1980 | Pop 1990 | Pop 2000 | Pop 2010 | Pop 2020 | % 1980 | % 1990 | % 2000 | % 2010 | % 2020 |
|---|---|---|---|---|---|---|---|---|---|---|
| White alone (NH) | 5,463 | 6,134 | 7,521 | 8,059 | 7,783 | 44.76% | 48.10% | 49.53% | 53.11% | 55.12% |
| Black or African American alone (NH) | 6,622 | 6,565 | 7,326 | 6,420 | 5,361 | 54.25% | 51.48% | 48.24% | 42.31% | 37.97% |
| Native American or Alaska Native alone (NH) | 1 | 12 | 29 | 43 | 62 | 0.01% | 0.09% | 0.19% | 0.28% | 0.44% |
| Asian alone (NH) | 12 | 3 | 21 | 31 | 27 | 0.10% | 0.02% | 0.14% | 0.20% | 0.19% |
| Native Hawaiian or Pacific Islander alone (NH) | x | x | 1 | 9 | 6 | x | x | 0.01% | 0.06% | 0.04% |
| Other race alone (NH) | 5 | 0 | 0 | 8 | 30 | 0.04% | 0.00% | 0.00% | 0.05% | 0.21% |
| Mixed race or Multiracial (NH) | x | x | 75 | 147 | 363 | x | x | 0.49% | 0.97% | 2.57% |
| Hispanic or Latino (any race) | 103 | 39 | 212 | 458 | 487 | 0.84% | 0.31% | 1.40% | 3.02% | 3.45% |
| Total | 12,206 | 12,753 | 15,185 | 15,175 | 14,119 | 100.00% | 100.00% | 100.00% | 100.00% | 100.00% |

=== 2020 census ===
As of the 2020 census, the county had 14,119 people, the median age was 49.0 years, 19.1% of residents were under the age of 18, and 24.6% of residents were 65 years of age or older. For every 100 females there were 94.2 males and for every 100 females age 18 and over there were 91.7 males age 18 and over.

The racial makeup of the county was 55.9% White, 38.0% Black or African American, 0.4% American Indian and Alaska Native, 0.2% Asian, 0.0% Native Hawaiian and Pacific Islander, 1.9% from some other race, and 3.4% from two or more races. Hispanic or Latino residents comprised 3.4% of the population.

0.0% of residents lived in urban areas, while 100.0% lived in rural areas.

There were 5,986 households in the county, of which 25.6% had children under the age of 18 living with them and 30.7% had a female householder with no spouse or partner present. About 31.7% of all households were made up of individuals and 15.5% had someone living alone who was 65 years of age or older. There were 7,024 housing units, of which 14.8% were vacant, with 79.6% of occupied housing units owner-occupied and 20.4% renter-occupied. The homeowner vacancy rate was 1.0% and the rental vacancy rate was 8.3%.

=== 2017 census estimate ===
At the 2017 census estimate, Calhoun County had a median age of 45.9 and a median household income of $44,010. Between 2016 and 2017 the median household income grew from $42,779 to $44,010, a 2.88% increase. The population of Calhoun County is 53.6% White Alone, 41.6% Black or African American Alone, and 3.58% Hispanic or Latino. 98.3% are U.S. citizens. The median property value in Calhoun County is $103,900, and the homeownership rate is 79.3%. Most people in Calhoun County commute by driving alone, and the average commute time is 27.2 minutes. The average car ownership in Calhoun County is 2 cars per household.

=== 2010 census ===
At the 2010 census, there were 15,175 people, 6,080 households, and 4,204 families living in the county. The population density was 39.8 inhabitants per square mile (15.4/km^{2}). There were 7,340 housing units at an average density of 19.3 units per square mile (7.5 units/km^{2}). The racial makeup of the county was 53.9% white, 42.6% black or African American, 0.3% American Indian, 0.2% Asian, 0.1% Pacific islander, 1.8% from other races, and 1.2% from two or more races. Those of Hispanic or Latino origin made up 3.0% of the population. In terms of ancestry, respondents identified as 42.6% of African American (which may include European ancestry; 15.4% American, 14.9% German, 8.5% Irish, and 7.1% of English heritage.

Of the 6,080 households, 30.3% had children under the age of 18 living with them, 48.6% were married couples living together, 15.9% had a female householder with no husband present, 30.9% were non-families, and 26.8% of all households were made up of individuals. The average household size was 2.47 and the average family size was 2.99. The median age was 43.4 years.

The median income for a household in the county was $36,790 and the median income for a family was $51,975. Males had a median income of $42,394 versus $31,001 for females. The per capita income for the county was $20,845. About 11.6% of families and 15.8% of the population were below the poverty line, including 22.4% of those under age 18 and 15.6% of those age 65 or over.

=== 2000 census ===
At the 2000 census, there were 15,185 people, 5,917 households, and 4,272 families living in the county. The population density was 40 people per square mile (15 people/km^{2}). There were 6,864 housing units at an average density of 18 units per square mile (6.9 units/km^{2}). The racial makeup of the county was 50.03% White, 48.69% Black or African American, 0.19% Native American, 0.14% Asian, 0.03% Pacific Islander, 0.24% from other races, and 0.69% from two or more races. 1.40% of the population were Hispanic or Latino of any race.

There were 5,917 households, out of which 30.20% had children under the age of 18 living with them, 52.00% were married couples living together, 15.80% had a female householder with no husband present, and 27.80% were non-families. 24.50% of all households were made up of individuals, and 9.60% had someone living alone who was 65 years of age or older. The average household size was 2.54 and the average family size was 3.03.

In the county, the population was spread out, with 25.10% under the age of 18, 7.40% from 18 to 24, 27.00% from 25 to 44, 26.70% from 45 to 64, and 13.80% who were 65 years of age or older. The median age was 39 years. For every 100 females, there were 90.10 males. For every 100 females age 18 and over, there were 86.40 males.

The median income for a household in the county was $32,736, and the median income for a family was $39,823. Males had a median income of $31,431 versus $22,267 for females. The per capita income for the county was $17,446. About 13.20% of families and 16.20% of the population were below the poverty line, including 20.40% of those under age 18 and 18.30% of those age 65 or over.

== Government and politics ==
The county government is a five-member council, elected from single-member districts. At the first meeting of the year, they choose a chairperson for the term; it is a rotating position.

Other elected positions in the county are Sheriff, Auditor, Coroner, Treasurer, and Clerk of Court. appointed positions are Coroner and Probate Judge.

Calhoun County Library is a historic library building located at St. Matthews, Calhoun County. It was built about 1877, and is a one-story, medium-gabled white clapboard structure in the Greek Revival style. It was originally built as a residence, but was adapted for use as a county library in 1949.

In the 21st century, the county has leaned Democratic in gubernatorial elections (with 2022 being the only exception), but in presidential elections the county leans Republican (with exceptions in 2008 and 2012).

United States presidential election results for Calhoun County, South Carolina
| Year | Republican | | Democratic | | Third party(ies) | |
| Year | No. | % | No. | % | No. | % |
|---|---|---|---|---|---|---|
| 1912 | 15 | 3.05% | 460 | 93.69% | 16 | 3.26% |
| 1916 | 41 | 5.52% | 665 | 89.50% | 37 | 4.98% |
| 1920 | 41 | 6.10% | 631 | 93.90% | 0 | 0.00% |
| 1924 | 5 | 0.83% | 593 | 99.00% | 1 | 0.17% |
| 1928 | 7 | 1.20% | 577 | 98.80% | 0 | 0.00% |
| 1932 | 10 | 1.42% | 694 | 98.58% | 0 | 0.00% |
| 1936 | 1 | 0.12% | 821 | 99.88% | 0 | 0.00% |
| 1940 | 3 | 0.45% | 657 | 99.55% | 0 | 0.00% |
| 1944 | 1 | 0.15% | 602 | 87.76% | 83 | 12.10% |
| 1948 | 4 | 0.45% | 36 | 4.09% | 841 | 95.46% |
| 1952 | 1,107 | 74.25% | 384 | 25.75% | 0 | 0.00% |
| 1956 | 146 | 12.37% | 341 | 28.90% | 693 | 58.73% |
| 1960 | 852 | 61.38% | 536 | 38.62% | 0 | 0.00% |
| 1964 | 1,591 | 72.22% | 612 | 27.78% | 0 | 0.00% |
| 1968 | 885 | 28.74% | 1,216 | 39.49% | 978 | 31.76% |
| 1972 | 1,867 | 60.91% | 1,148 | 37.46% | 50 | 1.63% |
| 1976 | 1,382 | 39.87% | 2,055 | 59.29% | 29 | 0.84% |
| 1980 | 1,767 | 45.86% | 2,043 | 53.02% | 43 | 1.12% |
| 1984 | 2,742 | 53.83% | 2,315 | 45.45% | 37 | 0.73% |
| 1988 | 2,585 | 54.00% | 2,175 | 45.44% | 27 | 0.56% |
| 1992 | 2,418 | 41.85% | 2,770 | 47.94% | 590 | 10.21% |
| 1996 | 2,520 | 45.02% | 2,716 | 48.52% | 362 | 6.47% |
| 2000 | 3,216 | 50.46% | 3,063 | 48.06% | 94 | 1.47% |
| 2004 | 3,448 | 49.83% | 3,393 | 49.04% | 78 | 1.13% |
| 2008 | 3,695 | 47.75% | 3,970 | 51.31% | 73 | 0.94% |
| 2012 | 3,707 | 47.32% | 4,045 | 51.63% | 82 | 1.05% |
| 2016 | 3,787 | 50.17% | 3,573 | 47.33% | 189 | 2.50% |
| 2020 | 4,305 | 51.92% | 3,905 | 47.10% | 81 | 0.98% |
| 2024 | 4,474 | 56.53% | 3,339 | 42.19% | 101 | 1.28% |

== Economy ==
Although much of Calhoun County is rural, there are many factories including Devro, a UK company that makes sausage casings. Other factories include Starbucks (Roasting Facility), DAK Americas, Zeus Industrial Products, Fitts Co Inc, and Thermo King Columbia, Inc. In the same part of the county Country Clear, Inc. produces bottled water.

Calhoun County offers the Calhoun County I-26 Industrial Park for businesses.

In 2022, its GDP was $790 million (approx. $55,956 per capita). In Chained 2017 dollars, the real GDP was $628.6 million (about $44,519 per capita). From 2022 through 2024, the unemployment rate in Calhoun County has fluctuated between 2.7% and 4.3%.

As of April 2024, some of the largest employers in the county include Devro and Starbucks.

Employment and Wage Statistics by Industry in Calhoun County, South Carolina
| Industry | Employment Counts | Employment Percentage (%) | Average Annual Wage ($) |
|---|---|---|---|
| Accommodation and Food Services | 102 | 2.7 | 23,140 |
| Administrative and Support and Waste Management and Remediation Services | 203 | 5.4 | 54,652 |
| Agriculture, Forestry, Fishing and Hunting | 209 | 5.6 | 46,800 |
| Construction | 449 | 11.9 | 59,592 |
| Finance and Insurance | 33 | 0.9 | 77,636 |
| Health Care and Social Assistance | 154 | 4.1 | 40,092 |
| Information | 29 | 0.8 | 62,400 |
| Manufacturing | 1,024 | 27.2 | 68,900 |
| Other Services (except Public Administration) | 83 | 2.2 | 40,144 |
| Professional, Scientific, and Technical Services | 94 | 2.5 | 59,072 |
| Public Administration | 388 | 10.3 | 41,184 |
| Real Estate and Rental and Leasing | 24 | 0.6 | 31,512 |
| Retail Trade | 248 | 6.6 | 21,944 |
| Transportation and Warehousing | 556 | 14.8 | 56,888 |
| Utilities | 100 | 2.7 | 77,532 |
| Wholesale Trade | 65 | 1.7 | 54,964 |
| Total | 3,761 | 100.0% | 54,536 |

== Communities ==
=== Towns ===
- Cameron
- St. Matthews (county seat and largest community)

=== Unincorporated communities ===
- Creston
- Fort Motte
- Lone Star
- Sandy Run

== See also ==
- List of counties in South Carolina
- National Register of Historic Places listings in Calhoun County, South Carolina
