= Legare =

Legare, Legaré or Légaré may refer to:

== People ==
=== Surname ===
- Daniel Legare, South Carolina politician during the American Revolution
- Bob LeGare (born 1956), American politician and realtor
- Étienne Légaré (born 1984), Canadian football player
- George Swinton Legaré (1869–1913), American politician
- Gérard Légaré (1908–1997), Canadian politician and journalist
- Hugh S. Legaré (1797–1843), American lawyer and politician
- James Matthews Legaré (1823–1859), American poet and inventor
- Jean-Louis Légaré (1841–1918), Canadian trader and colonist
- Joseph Légaré (1795–1855), Canadian painter and politician
- Nathan Légaré (born 2001), Canadian ice hockey player
- Ovila Légaré (1901–1978), Canadian actor and singer
- Pierre Légaré (1949–2021), Canadian humourist and comedian
- Romain Bruno Légaré (1925–2020), Canadian missionary
- Simon Legare (born 1989), Canadian football player
- Sylvain Légaré (born 1970), Canadian politician

=== Given name ===
- Legare Hairston (1892–1980), American football player

== Other uses ==
- Legare-Morgan House, a historic building in Aiken, South Carolina, United States
- Legare Stadium, a sports venue in Gobabis, Namibia
- Daniel Legare House, a historic building in Charleston, South Carolina, United States
- USCGC Legare, multiple United States Coast Guard ships
