= James B. Morrison =

South Carolina Sheriff & Redshirt (1846–1928)

James Brown Morrison
- James Morrison c. 1890, from family photo collection

Intendent of McClellanville
- In office 1926–1927
- Preceded by: position established
- Succeeded by: Paul H. Seabrook (as mayor)

Member of the South Carolina House of Representatives from Charleston County
- In office 1918–1920
- Preceded by: Richard Morrison Lofton
- Succeeded by: Edward Henry Barnwell
- In office 1914–1916
- Preceded by: Arnoldus VanderHorst
- Succeeded by: Edward Mitchell Seabrook

Sheriff of Berkeley County, South Carolina
- In office 1891–1905
- Preceded by: Archibald D. Rhame
- Succeeded by: Thomas D. Mazyck

Member of South Carolina Constitutional Convention
- In office 10 September 1895 – 4 December 1895

Member of the South Carolina House of Representatives from Berkeley County
- In office 1888–1890
- Preceded by: Charles Boyle
- Succeeded by: Edward James Dennis

Jury Commissioner for Berkeley County
- In office 1883–1887

Personal details
- Born: 28 January 1846 Barbour County, Alabama, US
- Died: 19 February 1928 (aged 82) McClellanville, South Carolina, US
- Party: Democratic Party (United States) (Redeemers); Southern Democrat
- Other political affiliations: Redshirts; Solid South
- Spouse: Eliza Hibben Leland (1847–1922)
- Children: 10
- Parent(s): Richard Morrison II, Elizabeth Ann Venning (1817–1859)
- Occupation: Soldier; Sheriff; Politician; Farmer; Businessman

Military service
- Allegiance: Confederate States of America: South Carolina
- Branch/service: Confederate States Army
- Years of service: 1863–1865
- Rank: Sergeant (CSA); Corporal (CSA); Private (CSA)
- Unit: "Lamar Guards" Company B, 19th South Carolina Infantry, Army of Tennessee, Confederate States Army
- Battles/wars: American Civil War: Atlanta Campaign; Battle of New Hope Church; Siege of Atlanta; Battle of Ezra Church; Battle of Franklin; Battle of Nashville; Carolinas Campaign; Battle of Bentonville; Bennett Place; Reconstruction era: Nov. 1876 Charleston Redshirt Riots

James Brown Morrison (1846–1928) was an American soldier, politician, sheriff, and farmer, who served in the American Civil War and also played a role as a Red Shirt during the Reconstruction Era in Charleston, South Carolina, supporting Wade Hampton III as an anti-carpetbagger candidate for governor in the 1876 election.

== Early life and family ==
James Brown Morrison Sr. was born to Richard Morrison II and Elizabeth Ann Venning. He joined the civil war in his early teenage years, and fought with the Army of Tennessee. He married his wife, Eliza Hibben Leland in 1870; they had seven children. His wife was a granddaughter of Rev. Aaron Leland, a great granddaughter of James Hibben, and a distant descendant of John Leland. Morrison was a fourth great-grandson of John Erskine, Earl of Mar (1675–1732), who was a leader of the Jacobite rising of 1715. He was also a 3rd great-grandson of Daniel Legare, a representative to the South Carolina Provincial Congress.

== Military Service ==
=== Civil War ===
At around 18 years old, Morrison joined the 19th South Carolina Infantry Regiment and went with them to join the Army of Tennessee, gathering in the Deep South. He served with them throughout the war seeing many battles including the Siege of Atlanta, the Battle of Nashville, and the Battle of Bentonville. He surrendered with his unit when the rest of his army surrendered at Bennett Place.

== Reconstruction Era and the Red Shirts ==
=== Election of 1876 ===
James Morrison circa. 1870, from family photo collection

Following the war, Morrison became active in local South Carolina politics during the Reconstruction era. He aligned himself with the Red Shirts, a paramilitary group that opposed the republican rule of the state as well as the African American vote. This group supported Wade Hampton III for governor in the election that year, a man who Morrison's father, Richard Morrison II, served under as an officer during the Civil War. Morrison and his constituents were a part of local rifle clubs that participated in voter intimidation campaigns and efforts to suppress political participation and drive out Federal occupying troops. This occurred in and around Charleston, South Carolina during the South Carolina civil disturbances of 1876. After the 1876 riots, and the election of Wade Hampton III, a republican would not be governor of South Carolina until 90 years later.

== Political Career ==
Morrison's political career included serving in the South Carolina House of Representatives for Berkeley County 1888-1889. After that he served as Sheriff of Berkeley County 1891-1905, resigning at the end with several years still left on his term. As sheriff, he exercised substantial influence over local law enforcement and elections, overseeing measures that reinforced the Democratic Parties dominance and maintained systems of voter suppression in accordance with the political norms of the post-Reconstruction era. He was also involved with court case Gibbes v. Morrison, 39 S.C. 369, 17 S.E. 803 (S.C. 1893). Morrison returned to the South Carolina House of Representatives representing Charleston County twice. Throughout his political career, he remained affiliated with the Democratic Party, which, during this period, was the primary vehicle for conservative political power in South Carolina. He also was the originator of the state highway and other bills. He also worked at the South Carolina Constitutional Convention in 1895. He ran in the 1922 United States House of Representatives elections in South Carolina but lost the primary.

== Later life ==
He lived in McClellanville for the majority of his later years. His last public office was that of first Intendent of McClellanville which was their version of a de-facto Mayor, he served that role 1926-1927. He died in 1928 at the age of 82.

== Legacy ==
Morrison appears in the South Carolina Legislative Manual (1919 edition), which records his public service — including his tenure as sheriff of Berkeley County, his service in the state House of Representatives for Berkeley (1888–1889) and Charleston (1915–1916), and his participation in the 1895 South Carolina constitutional convention. His daughter Susan married John T. Hills, a Supervisor of Roads in Charleston County, South Carolina.
