= Richard Morrison II =

American secessionist, politician, and veteran of The American Civil War

Capt. Richard Morrison II
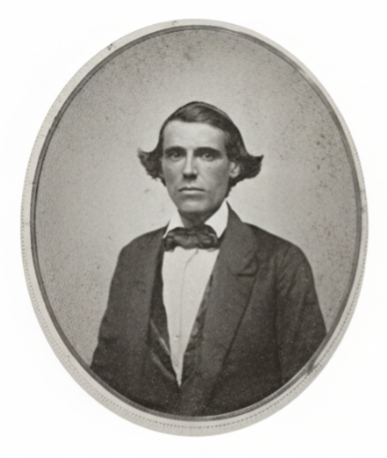
- Capt. Richard Morrison II c. 1850

Member of the South Carolina House of Representatives from Charleston County, CSA
- In office February 4, 1861 – November 6, 1861
- Preceded by: position established
- Succeeded by: Alexander Mazyck

Member of the South Carolina Republic House of Representatives from Charleston County
- In office December 20, 1860 – February 4, 1861
- Preceded by: position established
- Succeeded by: position abolished

Member of the South Carolina House of Representatives from Charleston County, USA
- In office November 5, 1860 – December 20, 1860
- Preceded by: Archibald J. McClellan
- Succeeded by: position abolished

Personal details
- Born: March 21, 1816 Charleston, South Carolina, United States
- Died: July 15, 1910 (aged 94) McClellanville, South Carolina, United States
- Resting place: McClellanville Methodist Church Cemetery, McClellanville, South Carolina
- Citizenship: United States; South Carolina Republic; Confederate States of America
- Party: Democratic Party
- Spouses: Elizabeth Ann Venning; Eliza Toomer
- Children: 17, including James B. Morrison
- Occupation: Military Officer; Settler; Farmer; Politician

Military service
- Allegiance: Confederate States of America: South Carolina
- Branch/service: Confederate States Army
- Years of service: 1861–1865
- Rank: Captain; Second Lieutenant
- Unit: Hampton's Legion; 4th South Carolina Cavalry Regiment, Cavalry Corps, Army of Northern Virginia
- Battles/wars: American Civil War; Raid at Combahee Ferry; Battle of Grimball's Landing; Battle of the Wilderness; Battle of Spotsylvania Court House; Battle of North Anna; Battle of Haw's Shop; Battle of Matadequin Creek; Battle of Cold Harbor; Battle of Trevilian Station; Siege of Petersburg; Beefsteak Raid; Battle of Vaughan Road; Battle of Boydton Plank Road; Carolinas campaign; Capture of Columbia; Battle of Monroe's Crossroads; Battle of Bentonville; Battle of Morrisville; Bennett Place

Captain Richard T. Morrison II (1816–1910) was an American secessionist, settler, military officer, politician, and farmer who was one of the founders of McClellanville, South Carolina. He served as a state representative for South Carolina between 1860 and 1861 where he voted for secession from the United States, thus directly causing the start of the American Civil War. In this time, he was serving the South Carolina government, through its secession, into its month or so long independence by itself, and then its joining with the Confederacy, and the start of the Civil War. He fought in the American Civil War and served as an officer, seeing action at many major battles. He survived the war, alongside his sons and returned back to South Carolina.

== Early life ==
Richard Tillia Morrison II was born on March 21, 1816, to Richard Tillia Morrison I and Elizabeth Toomer Legare. He married his wife Elizabeth Ann Venning around 1837and he married his second wife Eliza circa. 1860. Between his two wives, he had a total of 17 children. Morrison was a 3rd great-grandson of John Erskine, Earl of Mar (1675–1732), who was a leader of the Jacobite rising of 1715. He was also a 2nd great-grandson of Daniel Legare, a representative to the South Carolina Provincial Congress.

== Political career ==
=== State Representative ===
Richard Morrison served in the South Carolina House of Representatives from 1860 to 1861. In this time the South Carolina House of Representatives voted on secession and created the short lived South Carolina Republic, which existed until it was joined in secession by the other states of the Southern United States in the creation of the Confederate States of America.

== Military service ==
Morrison joined the Confederate Army as soon as the war broke out, joining in Charleston, South Carolina in 1861 with his sons, Richard III, Robert, and James. He brought his own horse and served as an officer in Hampton's Legion, seeing action at many of the wars major battles. He served in the Army of Northern Virginia as a cavalryman until his unit was moved into North Carolina as part of the Carolina Campaign.

== Later life and death ==
After returning home to his plantation around Jeremy Creek and the Santee River, he and another local land owner named A.J. McClellan sold off some of their land after the war to create the town of McClellanville. This was a place where people would go to get away from the Mosquitos and the summer fevers that plagues many of the surrounding lowlands. Soon after its founding in the 1860s, the village became the social and economic center for a wide area that produced timber, rice, cotton, naval stores, and seafoods. Richard Morrison lived on his plantation until his death in 1910 at the age of 94.
