= Cape Romain Lighthouses =

Lighthouses in South Carolina, US

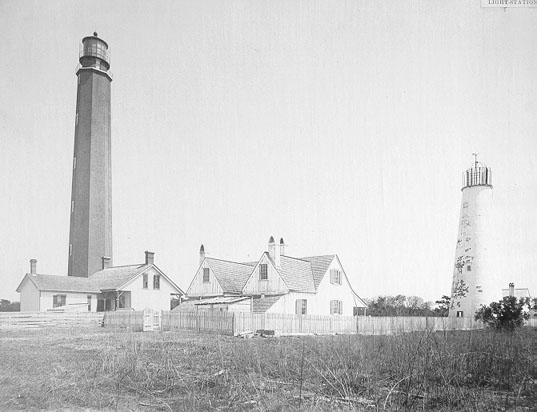
- Cape Romain Lighthouses on Lighthouse Island on Cape Romain Harbor
- Location: Charleston County, United States
- Coordinates: 33°01′08″N 79°22′25″W
- Heritage: National Register of Historic Places listed place
- 1857 light
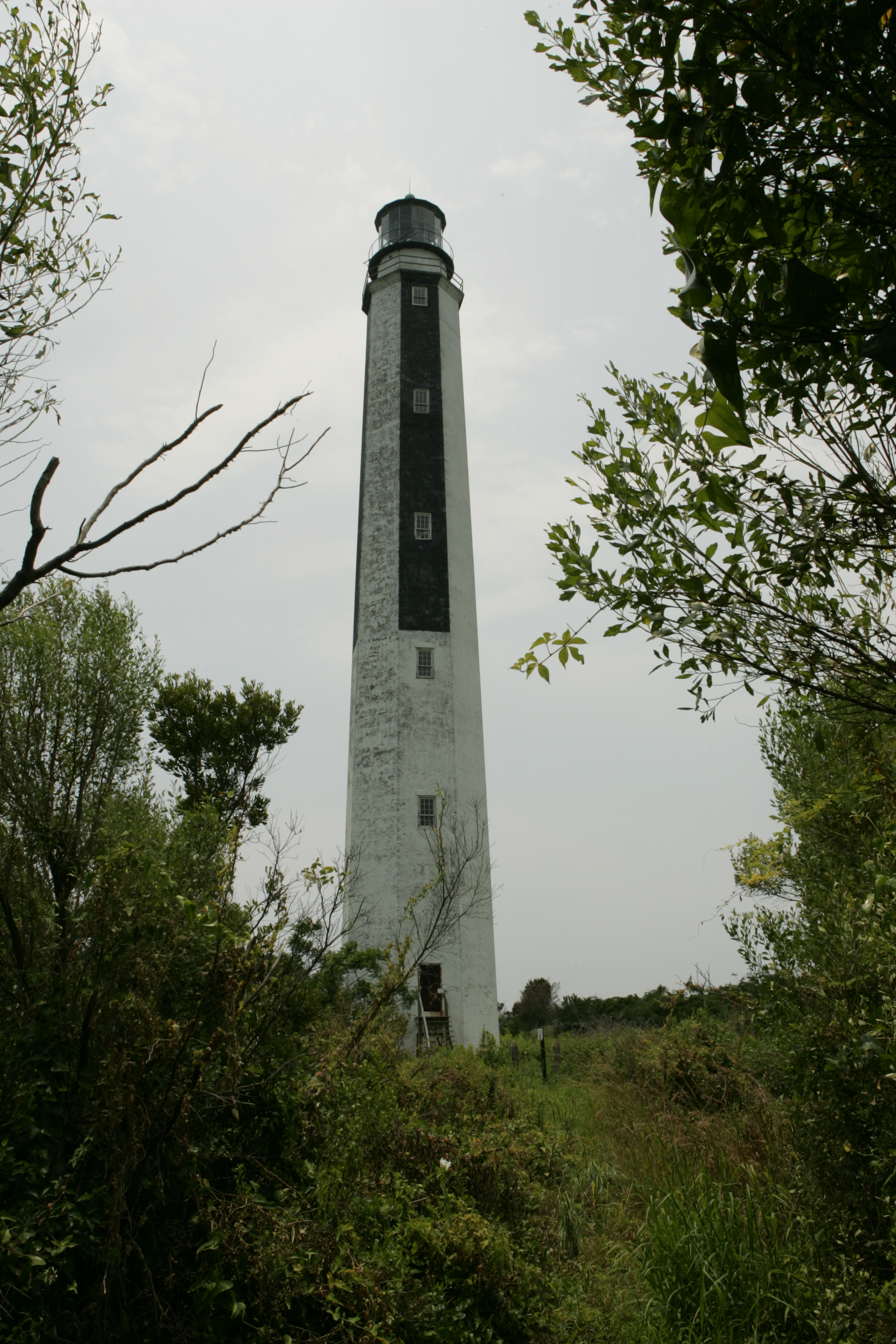
- Constructed: 1857
- Foundation: Timber pile
- Construction: brick
- Automated: 1937
- Height: 46 m (151 ft)
- Shape: octagon
- Markings: Upper 2/3: alternating white and black; Lower 1/3: white
- Heritage: National Register of Historic Places contributing property
- First lit: 1858
- Deactivated: 1947
- Focal height: 49 m (161 ft)
- Lens: 1st order Fresnel
- Range: 19 nmi (35 km; 22 mi)
- 1827 light
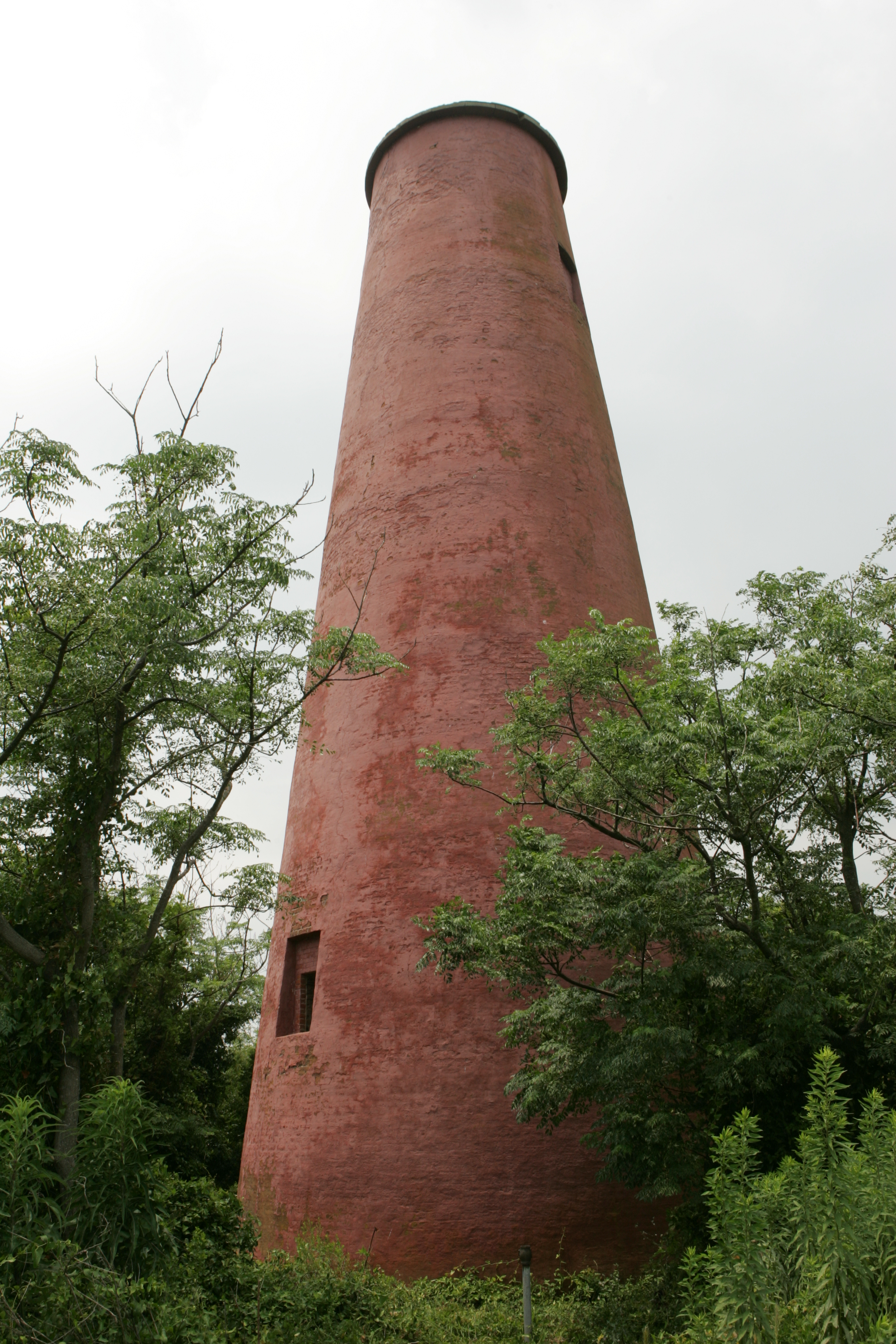
- Constructed: 1827
- Construction: brick
- Height: 65 ft (20 m)
- Shape: conical
- Markings: Red
- Heritage: National Register of Historic Places contributing property
- Deactivated: 1858
- Focal height: 87.5 ft (26.7 m)
- Lens: Winslow Lewis lamps and reflectors
- Cape Romain Lighthouses
- U.S. National Register of Historic Places
- Location within South Carolina Location within the United States
- Nearest city: McClellanville, South Carolina
- Coordinates: 33°1′7″N 79°22′26″W
- Area: 1.2 acres (0.49 ha)
- Built: 1857
- Architect: Winslow Lewis
- NRHP reference No.: 81000563
- Added to NRHP: November 12, 1981

The Cape Romain Lighthouses are a pair of brick lighthouses on Lighthouse Island southeast of McClellanville, South Carolina. The lighthouses are on the Cape Romain National Wildlife Refuge. The lighthouses were named to the National Register of Historic Places in 1981.

== Building of the lighthouses ==
=== Need ===
During the times of Spanish exploration, Cape Romain was known as Cape Roman, and then briefly, Cape Carteret. The Cape's shoals were treacherous, extending seven to nine miles off the coast. In the days before lighthouses, many vessels and people died when ships ventured onto the shoals, and wind and waves claimed them for the sea.

=== First building ===
When lighthouses were built to warn mariners away from the shoals, they saved many lives. The first lighthouse on Cape Romain was built by Winslow Lewis in 1827 on Northeast Raccoon Key. It cost $10,000 and the deal came with light keeper's quarters. The short, conical, brick lighthouse was 87 1/2 feet tall. Its red stationary light was fitted with 11 lamps and 21 inch reflectors. This lighthouse was a functional disappointment because the red, whale oil wick lamp could not be seen beyond 9–14 nautical miles. Today it is one of the few remaining lighthouses of its period in the U.S.

=== Second building ===
In 1853, $20,000 was appropriated to build a second lighthouse nearby, and to remove an old wind mill on Mill Island. A wick house, boat house, and two more dwellings were added nearby.

During construction, builders noticed that the new brick tower leaned toward the mainland. The lean has worsened over the years and today the tower is more than three feet off plumb.

Light keepers accessed the first order Fresnel lens after climbing 212 spiraling, cast-iron steps. The light was lit by oil lamp, with a revolving beam visible for 19 miles.

== Destruction and earthquakes ==
Just three years after the lighthouse was completed, the Civil War began, and lighthouses along the Atlantic Coast went dark. The light at Cape Romain was restored in 1866.

On August 31, 1886, “The keeper was in his house when the shock came. A gradually increasing rumbling ‘sounding something like a battery of artillery or a troop of cavalry crossing a long bridge,’ was heard before the shock. In less than a minute came the shocks, the first one lasting about two minutes, the next one as long and at about two minute intervals. The shocks did the tower no injury but its vibration was great. About a thousand “cranes” nest on the Key during the summer months, and these were flying about ‘making a fearful noise,’ during the shock, (“A Descriptive Narrative of the Earthquake of August 31, 1886, by Carlyle McKinley.)

== Lighthouse families ==
Opportunities for socializing were rare. Located seven miles from the mainland, isolation impacted every aspect of life for lighthouse families. Children had to be sent away to attend school. In the late nineteenth and early twentieth centuries, McClellanville’s villagers began holding “Cape Parties” on Lighthouse Island. They played games, swam, caught fish, and collected crabs and oysters, which they roasted on the beach.

== Refuge ==
In 1932 Lighthouse Island, Cape Island, Raccoon Key, and thousands of acres of salt marsh and tidal creeks were included in the new Cape Romain Migratory Bird Refuge. At that time it was managed by the U.S. Biological Survey, now known as the U.S. Fish and Wildlife Service.

For many years, refuge employees have sought resourceful solutions to protect the lighthouses from the damaging winds, storms, and salt air, but time has taken its toll. Because national wildlife refuges are established to care for animals and their habitats, the funding the refuge receives is for habitat and species management, rather than historic preservation. When refuge employees linked their efforts with partner and supporter Tommy Graham, disintegration of the old lights slowed.

Graham, a local historic restoration professional, worked with a team of refuge staff and volunteers to repair and repaint the lighthouses in 1983. Today he is working with Glenn Keyes, historic preservation architect, and John Moore, structural engineer, to design a solution for the rusted and unstable spiraling steps and to stabilize the structural instability of the lantern room. Four guided tours a year are offered by Cape Romain NWR, with transportation provided by Coastal Expeditions Ferry.
