= Duff Holbrook =

American biologist

Herman Lindsay "Duff" Holbrook (June 30, 1923 – July 17, 2015) was an American wildlife biologist, forester, and outdoorsman. He was recognized as one of the United States' leading experts on the wild turkey. Holbrook spearheaded the reintroduction of the wild turkey, as well as the white-tailed deer, to areas of its historic range in South Carolina.

Holbrook, together with William P. Baldwin Jr., a United States Fish and Wildlife Service (USFW) biologist, is credited as the inventor of the cannon-netting method, also known as the rocket net, which is used to capture turkeys and other birds. Holbrook utilized the canon nets to capture turkeys in Francis Marion National Forest and relocated them to Sumter National Forest and other areas in Upstate South Carolina to re-establish new populations. Baldwin credited Holbrook with the successful restoration of the species to the state, writing "From the midlands up, if you see a wild turkey, Duff put it there." As of 2015, wild turkeys can now be found in all of South Carolina's 46 counties. The turkeys that repopulated South Carolina, as well as parts of Georgia, are the descendants of the approximately 350 turkeys which were relocated by Holbrook during the 1950s.

== Biography ==
=== Early life ===
Holbrook was born in Phoebus, Virginia (now part of Hampton, Virginia), on June 30, 1923, to David James Holbrook and Myrtie Louise Holbrook. His grandfather gave him the nickname "Duff" in honor of a friend he had served with during World War I.

He was raised in the Tidewater region of eastern Virginia. He received degrees in wildlife management and forestry from both Virginia Tech's College of Natural Resources and Environment and the University of Michigan. Holbrook studied under Dr. Henry Mosby, an expert on the Eastern wild turkey, as a student at Virginia Tech.

Holbrook's education was interrupted by World War II. He left to enlist in the United States Army Air Corps, serving as a navigator on B-24 bombers for the 376th Bombardment Group, based in Italy. Holbrook flew to 14 combat missions, including raids on the Brenner Pass in the Alps, the Po Valley, and the cities of Vienna and Zagreb.

He completed his education after the war, including a master's degree from the University of Michigan.

== Career ==
=== Turkey and deer restoration ===
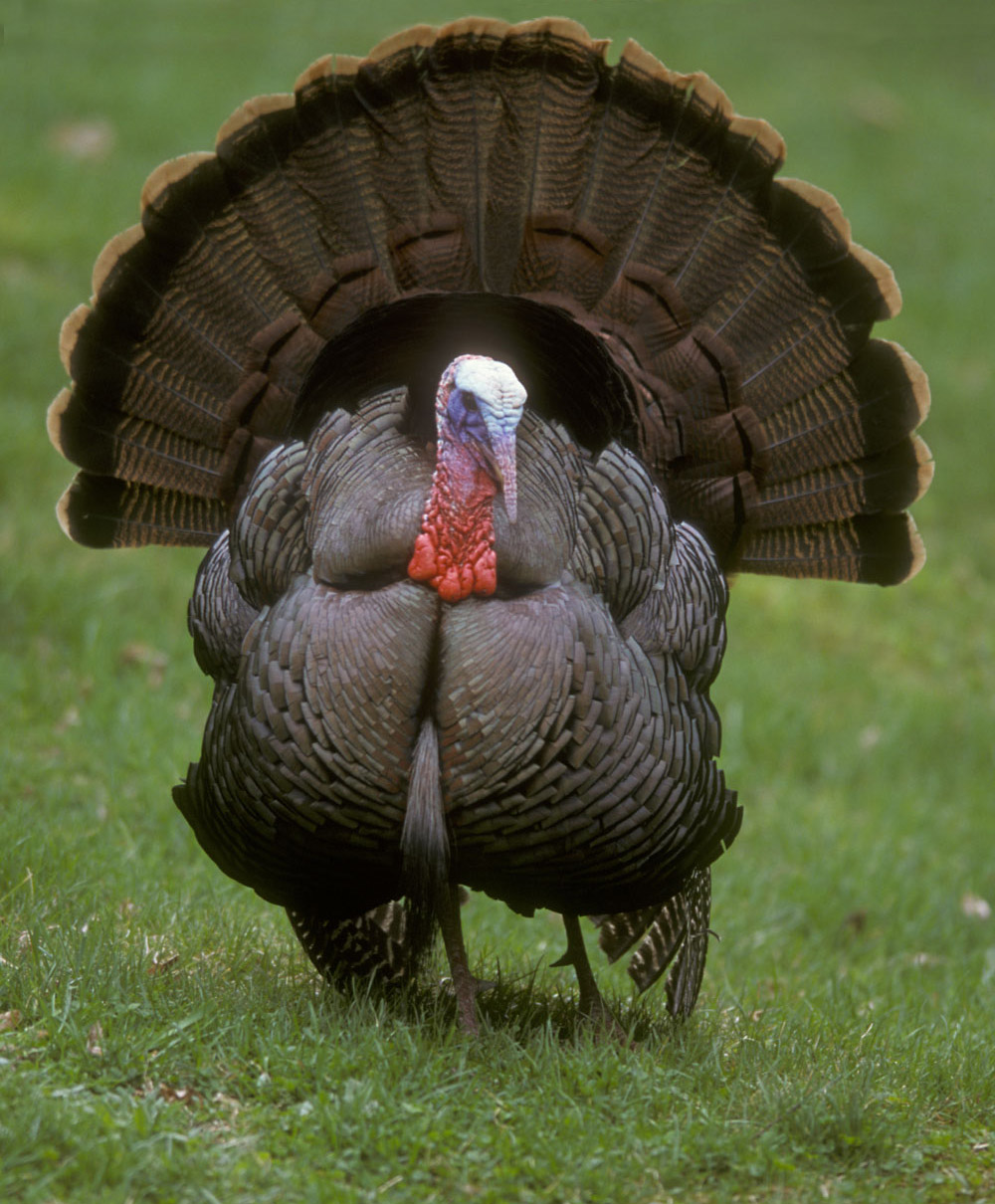
Male wild turkey.

Holbrook joined the Georgia Fish and Game Department following the war and the completion of his college degrees. He met his wife, Eleanor Atkins, while working at Georgia Fish and Game. The couple married on December 20, 1950, and had four children. Duff and Eleanor Holbrook relocated from Georgia to the South Carolina Lowcountry in 1951, where he took a job on a turkey trapping project with the South Carolina Wildlife Department, now called the Department of Natural Resources. The instructions given to Holbrook for his new job were simple, "You want to keep this job, catch turkeys and deer."

There were virtually no wild turkeys or white-tail deer in large parts of South Carolina. Wild turkeys, as well as deer, had been largely extirpated from most of the state, particularly the Piedmont and mountain regions upstate. Feral hogs has decimated the state's wild turkeys, which are ground nesting birds, by eating their eggs.

The state's only remaining, breeding populations of turkeys lived in Francis Marion National Forest in the coastal South Carolina Lowcountry. Holbrook, of the South Carolina Wildlife Department, and William P. Baldwin Jr., a USFW wildlife biologist, set out to restore wild turkeys (and deer) to their former ranges in the rest of South Carolina using the remaining, Lowcountry turkey populations. To protect the remaining turkeys from feral hogs, Holbrook constructed a 26-mile-long (42 km) fence around a portion of Francis Marion Forest. He also culled approximately 800 hogs to remove the turkey's major predator from Francis Marion. The eradication of the hogs protected and stabilized the Francis Marion Forest turkeys, which could then be relocated to other areas of the state.

Holbrook's turkey restoration project, which began in 1951 as partnership between the state and the United States Fish and Wildlife Service, was designed to restore the species to its former range. He and Baldwin had developed a new method to capture wild turkeys, called the cannon net or rocket net. Duff Holbrook, who had trapped turkeys as far back as 1948, utilized the new canon-netting invention to trap live, wild turkeys living in Francis Marion National Forest.

The captured turkeys were transported and released in protected upstate wildlife areas, including Sumter National Forest. Holbrook relocated 350 turkeys, which had been captured in Francis Marion National Forest and the Lowcountry, to their former habitat in Upstate South Carolina's Sumter National Forest and other protected areas between 1951 and 1959.

Holbrook's turkey program, which ended in 1959, led to the successful restoration of wild turkey to their former range throughout the rest of the state. The turkeys that repopulated South Carolina and portions of Georgia, are the descendants of the 350 turkeys which were relocated by Holbrook between 1951 and 1959. Wild turkeys are now found in every county in South Carolina, as of 2015, a legacy credited to Holbrook's efforts in the 1950s.

The deer recovery program, which was also overseen by Holbrook during the 1950s, also proved a successful.

Holbrook partner from the USFW, William P. Baldwin Jr., attempted a separate turkey relocation program over the course of 12 years. Baldwin captured another group of turkeys in Francis Marion National Forest and relocated them to Cape Romain National Wildlife Refuge on Bull's Island. However, Baldwin's introduction attempt proved much less successful than Holbrook's upstate project. Cape Romain's large tick population decimated Baldwin's introduced turkeys and the project was abandoned after 12 years. Baldwin later praised the success of Holbrook's similar reintroduction program noting, "From the midlands up, if you see a wild turkey, Duff put it there."

Holbrook's successful re-establishment of the state's wild turkeys ultimately led to the 1973 formation of the National Wild Turkey Federation, which is headquartered in South Carolina. In 1976, the turkey was named as South Carolina's State Wild Game Bird in 1976.

The rocket net developed by Holbrook is now widely used to capture wild turkeys and other large birds.

=== U.S. Forestry Service and later career ===
Holbrook joined the United States Forest Service following the end of his turkey restoration project in 1959. During his tenure with the U.S. Forest Service, Holbrook created an entirely new wildlife and timber management system, which was implemented at all United States National Forests throughout the Southeast. He retired from the Forest Service in 1983.

In 1983, shortly before his retirement from the Forestry Service, Holbrook was contacted by Peter Manigault, the Chairman of Evening Post Industries, a major South Carolina newspaper publishing company. Manigault offered him a job managing Evening Post Industries' new forestry subsidiary, the White Oak Forestry Corp., which the company was establishing in South Carolina's Lowcountry. Holbrook accepted the offer and moved from his home in Atlanta back to South Carolina.

Holbrook headed White Oak Forestry Corp. for almost twenty years, joking that, "I was retired the one day it took to drive from Atlanta to Charleston." He was succeeded by White Oak Forestry Corp. President Michael Previous in the 2000s.

Duff Holbrook, a resident of McClellanville, South Carolina, died on July 17, 2015, at the age of 92. He was survived by his wife of 64 years, Eleanor Holbrook, and their four children, David Lindsay Holbrook, Carolyn Denise Holbrook, Todd Holbrook, and Marilyn Elaine Buda.
