= McClellanville Historic District =

Historic district in South Carolina, United States

- U.S. National Register of Historic Places
- U.S. Historic district
- Location within South Carolina Location within the United States
- Location: Pinckney, Lofton, Charlotte, Church, Water, Oak, Venning, Legare, Morrison, and Scotia Sts., McClellanville, South Carolina
- Coordinates: 33°5′6″N 79°27′43″W
- Area: 93 acres (38 ha)
- Built: 1925
- Architectural style: Gothic, Italianate, Queen Anne
- NRHP reference No.: 82003845
- Added to NRHP: March 23, 1982

McClellanville Historic District is a national historic district located at McClellanville, Charleston County, South Carolina. The district encompasses 105 contributing buildings in the town of McClellanville dating from ca. 1860 to ca. 1935. They include residential, commercial, religious and educational building dating between about 1860 to 1935. Architectural styles include: Carpenter Gothic, Queen Anne, and Italianate. The commercial strip developed in the early 20th century and are of frame construction built directly on the road. Notable buildings include the King Brothers Store, McClellanville Public School, New Wappetaw Presbyterian Church (c. 1877), Bank of McClellanville (c. 1919), McClellanville Methodist Episcopal Church (c. 1902), and a number of dwellings originally built as summer homes by St. James Santee and Georgetown planters.

It was listed on the National Register of Historic Places on March 23 1982.
