= Isaac E. Holmes =

American politician

Isaac Edward Holmes
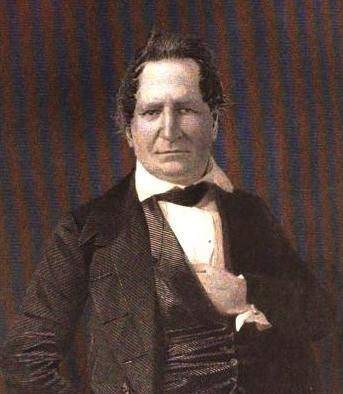

Member of the U.S. House of Representatives from South Carolina
- In office March 4, 1839 – March 3, 1851
- Preceded by: Hugh S. Legaré
- Succeeded by: William Aiken Jr.
- Constituency: 1st district (1839–43); 6th district (1843–51)

Member of the South Carolina House of Representatives from St. Philip's and St. Michael's Parish
- In office November 27, 1826 – December 18, 1829
- In office November 26, 1832 – December 29, 1833

Personal details
- Born: April 6, 1796 Charleston, South Carolina
- Died: February 24, 1867 (aged 70) Charleston, South Carolina
- Party: Democratic
- Education: Yale College
- Profession: lawyer, politician

Isaac Edward Holmes (April 6, 1796 – February 24, 1867) was a U.S. representative from South Carolina.

== Biography ==
Isaac Edward Holmes was born in Charleston, South Carolina, on April 6, 1796. He attended the common schools, received private tuition, and graduated from Yale College in 1815. He studied law and was admitted to the bar in 1818. He commenced practice in Charleston.

He served as member of the Charleston city council and then in the South Carolina House of Representatives in 1826-1829 and 1832-1833.

Holmes was elected as a Democrat to the Twenty-sixth and five succeeding Congresses (March 4, 1839 – March 3, 1851). He served as chairman of the Committee on Commerce (Twenty-eighth Congress) and Committee on Naval Affairs (Twenty-ninth Congress). After his tenure in Congress, he practiced law in San Francisco, California, from 1851 to 1854, when he returned to Charleston, South Carolina. He again resided in San Francisco from 1857 to 1861.

He returned to South Carolina in 1861 and was appointed a commissioner of the state to confer with the federal government prior to the outbreak of the Civil War.

He died in Charleston on February 24, 1867, and was interred in Circular Churchyard.

== Sources ==
- United States Congress. "Isaac E. Holmes (id: H000738)". Biographical Directory of the United States Congress.

U.S. House of Representatives
Preceded by Hugh S. Legaré	Member of the U.S. House of Representatives from South Carolina's 1st congressional district 1839–1843	Succeeded by James A. Black
Preceded by William Butler	Member of the U.S. House of Representatives from South Carolina's 6th congressional district 1843–1851	Succeeded by William Aiken, Jr.
