= McClellanville, South Carolina =

- Town
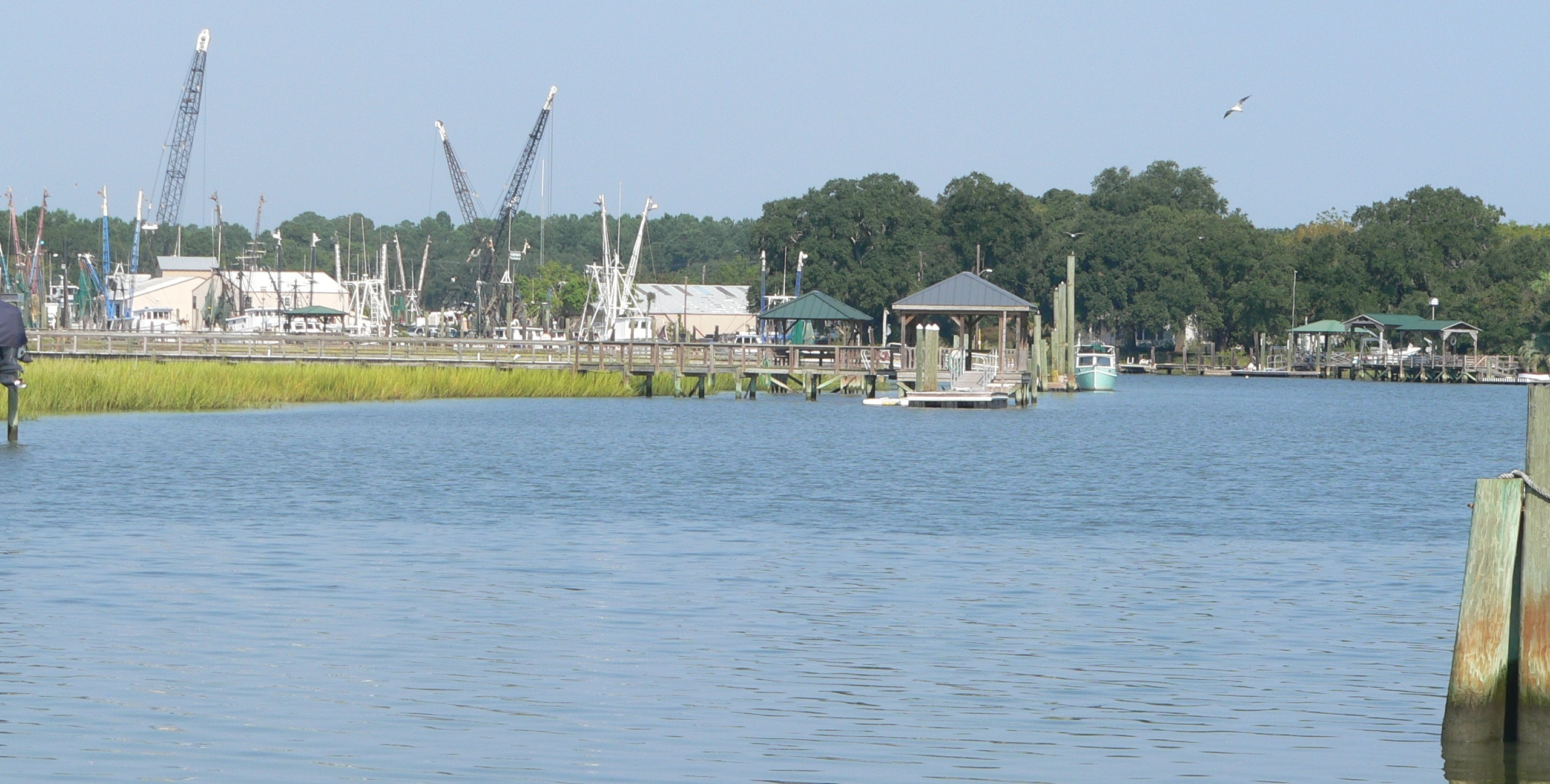
- Jeremy Creek at McClellanville; looking upstream

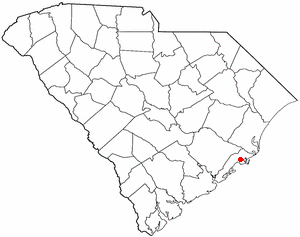
- Location of McClellanville in South Carolina
- Coordinates: 33°05′11″N 79°28′05″W
- Country: United States
- State: South Carolina
- County: Charleston

Area
  - Total: 2.34 sq mi (6.07 km^{2})
  - Land: 2.23 sq mi (5.77 km^{2})
  - Water: 0.12 sq mi (0.31 km^{2})
- Elevation: 0 ft (0 m)

Population (2020)
  - Total: 605
  - Density: 271.6/sq mi (104.87/km^{2})
- Time zone: UTC-5 (EST)
  - Summer (DST): UTC-4 (EDT)
- ZIP code: 29458
- Area codes: 843, 854
- FIPS code: 45-43585
- GNIS feature ID: 2406123
- Website: www.mcclellanvillesc.org

McClellanville is a small fishing town in rural Charleston County, South Carolina, United States. The population was 605 at the 2020 census. It is situated on the Atlantic coast, on land surrounded by Francis Marion National Forest and has traditionally derived its livelihood from the Atlantic Ocean and coastal marshes by fishing, shrimping and oystering. McClellanville is part of the Charleston-North Charleston-Summerville metropolitan area and the Charleston-North Charleston Urbanized Area.

== History ==
McClellanville village began in the late 1860s when local plantation owners A.J. McClellan and Richard Morrison II sold lots in the vicinity of Jeremy Creek to planters of the Santee Delta, who sought relief from summer fevers. Morrison's son, James Morrison served as the first Intendent as the town was founded in 1926. The first store opened soon after the Civil War, and the village became the social and economic center for a wide area that produced timber, rice, cotton, naval stores, and seafoods.

In 1989 the town was devastated by the full brunt of Hurricane Hugo which destroyed homes, downed century-old oaks, deposited shrimp boats in front yards, and otherwise altered much of the picturesque character of this historic fishing village. The stronger north side of the eyewall passed directly over the village while a Category 4 hurricane. Residents taking refuge in the local high school, a designated storm shelter, were surprised by a storm surge which threatened to drown the refugees. Helping one another in complete darkness, they managed to crawl into a space above the false ceilings of the building, and none were lost.

The Bethel African Methodist Episcopal Church, Cape Romain Lighthouses, Fairfield Plantation, Hampton Plantation, Harrietta Plantation, McClellanville Historic District, Wedge Plantation, and Old Georgetown Road are listed on the National Register of Historic Places.

== Geography ==
McClellanville is located in northeastern Charleston County. U.S. Route 17 passes along the northwestern edge of the town, leading northeast 23 miles (37 km) to Georgetown and southwest 38 miles (61 km) to Charleston.

According to the United States Census Bureau, McClellanville has a total area of 2.4 square miles (6.1 km^{2}), of which 2.2 square miles (5.8 km^{2}) is land and 0.1 square miles (0.3 km^{2}), or 5.02%, is water. Jeremy Creek, a tidal inlet, runs through the center of the town, and the town limits extend south to the Intracoastal Waterway, adjacent to Cape Romain National Wildlife Refuge.

== Demographics ==
Historical population
Census	Pop.	Note	%±
1930	502		—
1940	431		−14.1%
1950	417		−3.2%
1960	354		−15.1%
1970	304		−14.1%
1980	436		43.4%
1990	333		−23.6%
2000	459		37.8%
2010	499		8.7%
2020	605		21.2%
U.S. Decennial Census

=== 2020 census ===
McClellanville racial composition
Race	Num.	Perc.
White (non-Hispanic)	560	92.56%
Black or African American (non-Hispanic)	18	2.98%
Native American	2	0.33%
Other/Mixed	19	3.14%
Hispanic or Latino	6	0.99%

As of the 2020 United States census, there were 605 people, 222 households, and 149 families residing in the town.

=== 2000 census ===
As of the census of 2000, there were 459 people, 206 households, and 138 families residing in the town. The population density was 220.9 inhabitants per square mile (85.3/km^{2}). There were 254 housing units at an average density of 122.2 per square mile (47.2/km^{2}). The racial makeup of the town was 92% White and 7.14% African American. Hispanic or Latino of any race were 2.18% of the population.

There were 206 households, out of which 20.4% had children under the age of 18 living with them, 58.7% were married couples living together, 5.8% had a female householder with no husband present, and 33.0% were non-families. 29.6% of all households were made up of individuals, and 12.1% had someone living alone who was 65 years of age or older. The average household size was 2.23 and the average family size was 2.75.

In the town, the population was spread out, with 16.3% under the age of 18, 7.0% from 18 to 24, 20.9% from 25 to 44, 36.4% from 45 to 64, and 19.4% who were 65 years of age or older. The median age was 48 years. For every 100 females, there were 96.2 males. For every 100 females age 18 and over, there were 92.0 males.

The median income for a household in the town was $42,500, and the median income for a family was $50,000. Males had a median income of $36,750 versus $25,781 for females. The per capita income for the town was $22,425. About 8.3% of families and 11.8% of the population were below the poverty line, including 21.8% of those under age 18 and 8.6% of those age 65 or over.

== Government ==
The city is run by an elected mayor–council government system.

=== Mayor ===
Rutledge B. Leland III

=== Council members ===
Aaron Baldwin, Robert J. Gannon, Chris B Bates, James E. Scott IV.

== Education ==
Charleston County School District operates district public schools serving McClellanville.

St. James-Santee Elementary School is in McClellanville.

Lincoln High School was in McClellanville but closed in 2015. In 2016 school district staff stated that they were considering having a new Lincoln High constructed in Awendaw.

Cape Romain Environmental Education Charter School (CREECS) is a charter school in McClellanville.

== Notable people ==
- Richard Morrison II, South Carolina secessionist and Planter
- James B. Morrison, South Carolina sheriff and politician
- Duff Holbrook, wildlife biologist and forestry expert, reintroduced wild turkey to much of South Carolina.
- Archibald Rutledge, first poet laureate of South Carolina and prolific author.
