= James Hibben =

American planter, politician, and South Carolina state legislator

Member of the South Carolina State Senate
- In office 1800–1815

Member of the South Carolina House of Representatives
- In office 1795–1800

Personal details
- Born: 20 December 1767 Province of South Carolina, British America
- Died: 4 January 1835 (aged 67) Mount Pleasant, South Carolina, United States
- Spouse: Sarah Wells
- Children: 4
- Occupation: Planter, Politician

Captain James Hibben (20 December 1767 – 4 January 1835) was a South Carolina state politician and early settler of Mount Pleasant, South Carolina. He served in the South Carolina State Senate and the South Carolina House of Representatives.

== Early life ==
James Hibben was born in 1767 to Andrew Hibben and Elizabeth Barksdale. He served in the South Carolina State Senate as well as the South Carolina House of Representatives.

== Later life and legacy ==
Hibben was a prominent planter in Mount Pleasant, South Carolina, and his plantation house still stands today. His daughter Eliza Hibben married Aaron W. Leland. His great-granddaughter Eliza Hibben Leland married James B. Morrison.
