= Bethel African Methodist Episcopal Church (McClellanville, South Carolina) =

Historic church in South Carolina, United States

- U.S. National Register of Historic Places
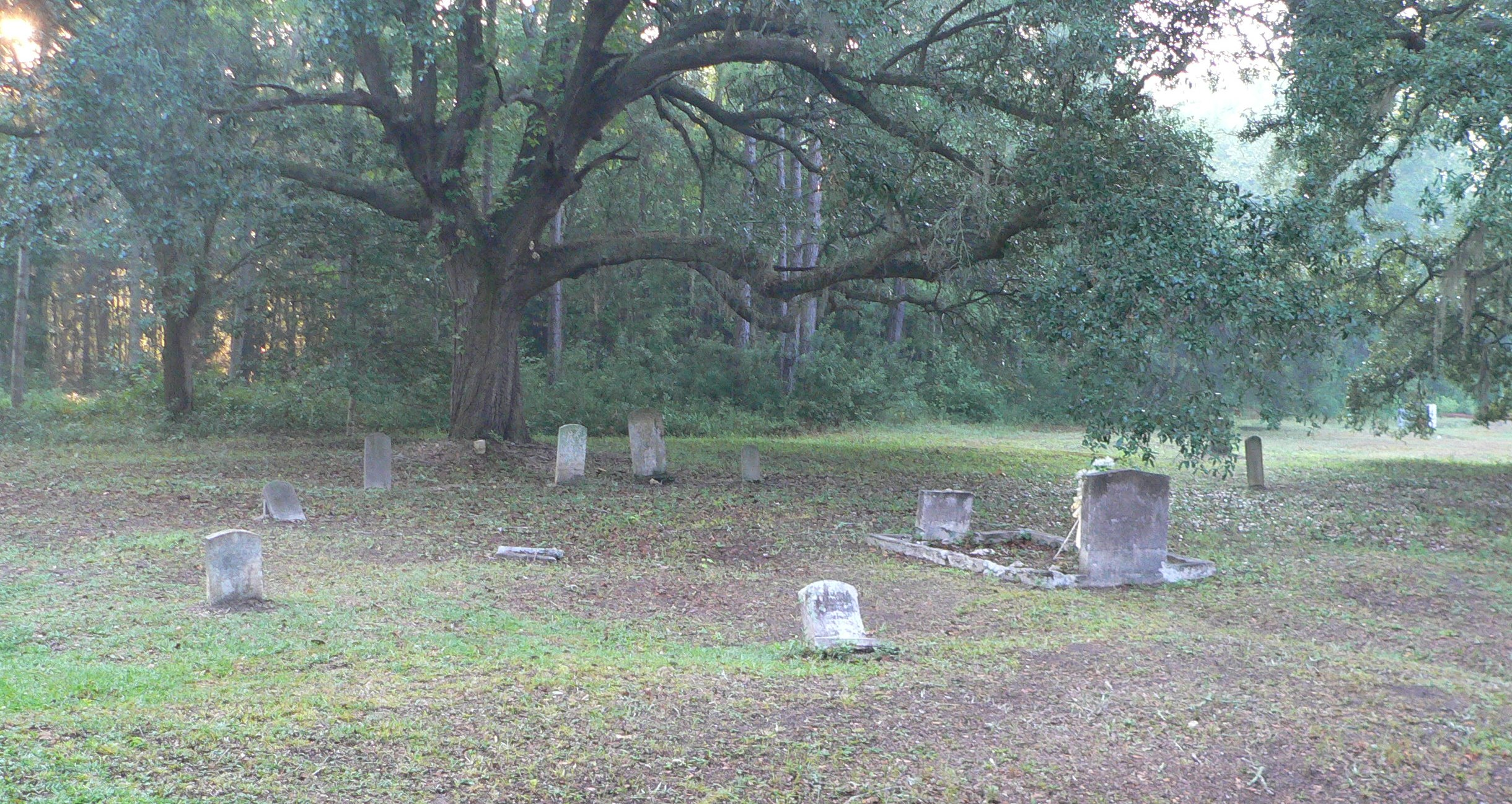
- Cemetery at Bethel AME Church

- Location within South Carolina Location within the United States
- Location: 369 Drayton St., McClellanville, South Carolina
- Coordinates: 33°5′21″N 79°27′24″W
- Area: 2.3 acres (0.93 ha)
- Built: 1872
- Architectural style: Gothic
- NRHP reference No.: 04000651
- Added to NRHP: June 22, 2004

Bethel African Methodist Episcopal Church is a historic African Methodist Episcopal church located at 369 Drayton Street in McClellanville, South Carolina. It was built around 1872, and is a one-story, rectangular frame vernacular Gothic Revival church. It has a pedimented gable-front roof that supports a square-based steeple. A cemetery is on the property. It was added to the National Register of Historic Places in 2004.
