= Old Georgetown Road (Charleston County, South Carolina) =

United States historic place

- U.S. National Register of Historic Places
- Location within South Carolina Location within the United States
- Nearest city: McClellanville, South Carolina
- Coordinates: 33°9′15″N 79°28′46″W
- NRHP reference No.: 14000382
- Added to NRHP: June 27, 2014

The Old Georgetown Road is a historic road section near McClellanville, South Carolina, USA. It runs from the Santee River to South Carolina Highway 45, and is about 6.6 miles (10.6 km) in length. It is one of longest surviving unpaved sections of the King's Highway, a colonial-era road network that extended all the way from Charleston, South Carolina, to Boston, Massachusetts.

The road was listed on the National Register of Historic Places in 2014.

== See also ==
- National Register of Historic Places listings in Charleston County, South Carolina
