= Carlyle McKinley =

American journalist (1847–1904)

Carlyle "Carl" McKinley (1847 – August 24, 1904) was a soldier, theological student, cotton broker, newspaper editor, poet, and essayist in the United States. He lived in South Carolina and served in the Confederate Army during the American Civil War.

McKinley wrote for the Charleston News and Courrier. Notable reports written by McKinley include his reporting on a hurricane that hit Charleston on August 25, 1885, and his report on an earthquake that hit Charleston on August 31, 1886.

He was a proponent of "black expatriation".

== Works ==
- An appeal to Pharaoh; the negro problem, and its radical solution. Fords, Howard & Hulbert, New York (1890).
- "Timrod Souvenir', in honor of Henry Timrod
