= Aaron W. Leland =

American Presbyterian minister

Aaron Leland
- Leland circa 1815

Presbyterian Church Moderator of the General Assembly
- In office 1850–1851
- Preceded by: Nicholas Murray
- Succeeded by: Edward P. Humphrey

Personal details
- Born: 1 October 1787 Peru, Massachusetts, United States
- Died: 2 November 1871 (aged 84) Columbia, South Carolina, United States
- Resting place: First Presbyterian Churchyard, Columbia, South Carolina
- Spouses: Eliza Hibben; Clara Blight
- Children: 10
- Religion: Presbyterian, Puritan
- Ordained: April 6, 1811
- Writings: The Secret Counsels of God (1834); A Discourse Delivered Before the State Temperance Society of South Carolina (1838)
- Congregations served: First (Scots) Presbyterian Church; Columbia Theological Seminary
- Education: Williams College(B.A.); Brown University(M.A.); University of South Carolina(D.D.)
- Occupation: Presbyterian Reverend; Professor; Translator

Reverend Aaron Whitney Leland was an American Presbyterian minister, theologian, scholar, and educator. A native of Massachusetts, he spent most of his adult life and career in South Carolina, where he served as a pastor, published many sermons over the course of decades, and taught at Columbia Theological Seminary for over 30 years. His sermons were widely circulated within the United States during the nineteenth century. He was a minister during the Second Great Awakening and was also an early advocate of the Temperance Movement.

== Early life ==
Aaron was born in 1787 to Rev. John Leland and Hephzibah Leland. His father and his family were generational puritans by heritage. He studied at Williams College in Massachusetts, graduating in 1808. Shortly after he graduated he moved to Charleston, South Carolina where he began teaching at Mount Pleasant Academy. He married his first wife, Eliza Hibben in 1809 in Mount Pleasant, South Carolina, she was a daughter of local planter and politician James Hibben.

== Ministry ==
Leland became a licensed minister by the Harmony Presbytery on April 6, 1811, and was ordained as an evangelist on May 2, 1812. He was called to First Presbyterian Church in Charleston where he became a pastor in 1813. In 1833 he joined the staff of Columbia Theological Seminary where he worked as a Professor of Theology, a position he held for over 30 years. He trained generations of southern ministers in his time as a professor and he also served as Moderator of the Old School General Assembly in 1850. In his time as a minister and he published many sermons that would be read around the nation, via publications such as the National Preacher.

== Later life ==
On October 11, 1863, while entering a store on a street, he suffered a stroke that left him paralyzed. He recovered and continued to preach the next day, even though his speech was unintelligible jargon, and continued his career, undeterred. He married his second wife, Clara Blight, in 1859. In his later years he worked as an English and German translator for the government in Washington, D.C.. His new wife helped him in his old age and condition until he died in 1871.
