= Rocket net =

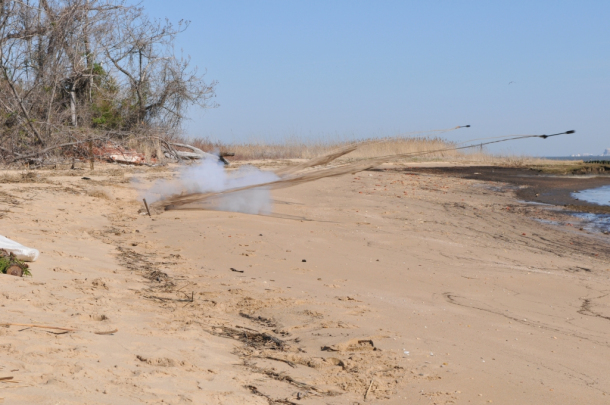
Cannon net being deployed

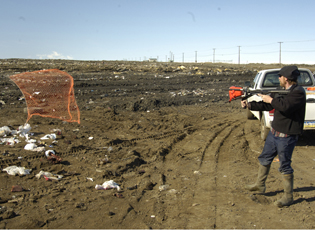
Net gun being fired by a USDA researcher to capture birds

Rocket nets and cannon nets are types of animal traps used to trap many live animals, usually birds, but they also have been used to catch large animals such as various species of deer. Rocket nets, cannon nets, and other net launching devices are built upon similar principles have been used since the 1950s (Dill and Thornsberry 1950, Hawkins et al. 1968, Grubb 1988 and 1991).

Rocket and cannon nets are used in conservation programs where many live animals need to be captured for analysis, veterinary care or relocation.

== Devices ==
=== Rocket nets ===
The Rocket Net consists of an accordion folded rectangular net with one edge attached to the ground by short ropes or shock cords. The net can be placed directly on the ground in a line or can be folded and placed in a specially designed box (Grubb 1988). Nets specifically designed for rocket nets can be purchased from several wildlife supply and net manufacturers.

The rockets are constructed from heavy gauge metal pipes with caps threaded and welded on one end with a removable cap on the opposite end that contains ports for the expanding gasses to escape. The rocket charges are made from black powder and an electric match enclosed that is used to ignite M6 Howitzer propellant. All three components are enclosed in a larger plastic bag with shunted leg wires extending out of the bag. Currently the primary manufacturer of rockets for rocket nets is Winn-Star in Carbondale Illinois.

In addition to the rocket net, other specialty equipment is necessary for the safe firing and storage of rocket nets and their charges. A blasting galvanometer, capacitor discharge machine, and electrical blasting line are recommended for the safe use of this equipment. In addition, an IME-22 container is necessary for the safe transportation of charges and an explosives magazine is required for long-term storage. Transportation and storage of the charges are regulated by the US Department of Transportation; Department of Alcohol, Tobacco, Firearms and Explosives; and by other state and local agencies (ATF: Explosives Law and Regulations, ATF P 5400.7 and 29 CFR, Part 1910.109 and IME Safety Library Publication Numbers 1,3,12, 22, and 14). The US Fish and Wildlife Service and State Wildlife Agencies regulate their use to capture birds and other wildlife.

=== Cannon nets ===
Cannon nets are similar to rocket net except a cannon-net projectile is a heavy metal barrel which is fired from a launch-rod attached to a metal plate. Cannon propellant is smokeless gunpowder ignited by an electric match. The primary advantage of cannon nets is the lack of explosives, therefore storage and transportation is easier. However, cannon-net projectiles have to be cleaned after every use. A full-sized cannon-net may utilize four or more cannons to pull the net over the target birds. Smaller nets with fewer cannons may also be used.

=== Air powered cannon ===
The Martin Engineering Net Blaster is a similar device that propels a weight attached to a rocket net via a rope without the use of explosives. The Net Blaster was developed between researchers at USDA APHIS Wildlife Services and Martin Engineering as an alternative to the rocket net where the use of explosive charges would not be advisable, such as capturing oiled birds at an oil spill. The Net Blaster is charged with a portable compressor and set out in a similar fashion to the rocket nets placed in boxes. The air powered cannon is much quieter than rocket nets, but are much more expensive and less powerful.

== Use ==
The rocket net or similar-looking item is placed at the target location after days or week of pre-baiting the target species in, or is placed in an area where it is likely to capture the target animals, to allow animals to become accustomed to its presence. When the biologist is ready to use the actual rocket net, the net is folded accordion style in a line or packed in the rocket net bock. The rear or trailing edge of the net is staked to the ground by ropes and the leading edge of the net is attached to a number of rockets (typically 3 or 4) via longer ropes. The rockets are placed on the box, staked to the ground, or placed on post for additional elevation when taller animals are trapped. The charges are placed in the rocket and the wires attached to a shunted electrical blasting line. Once all the charges are connected, the line is tested, and the area is safe, it is attached to the capacitor blasting machine. When the animals are in place, the operator activates the blasting machine and the electrical charge ignites the rockets, propelling the net over the animals. The biologists and their team then remove the animals for whatever study they are conducting.

=== Catching waders ===
When cannon-netting is carried out for the purpose of catching large numbers of waders or shorebirds for banding and release, it requires an experienced team to coordinate and manage not only the catch itself, but also the subsequent care and processing of the birds to their eventual safe release. Catching is usually conducted on tidal beaches with nutritious tidewrack, or adjacent to coastal mudflats, though occasionally other locations, such as salt lakes or sewage treatment lagoons, are used.

- Planning. In the days preceding a catch, known and likely high-tide roosting sites are reconnoitered to establish the best prospective site for a catch, although a final decision may not be made until immediately prior to net-setting. Consideration of expected maximum tide height and wind direction may affect the precise placement of the net.
- Setting the net. The net is usually set during low tide when the birds are dispersed and feeding. The mesh of the net must be free of any obstacles such as twigs, leaves and shells that might obstruct its deployment when fired. The bunched net is laid in a line with pegged 'jump ropes' attached to the back edge. Markers are set to indicate the extent of the catching area. The heavy iron projectiles are attached to the projectile ropes that will pull the leading edge of the net, and are inserted in the partly buried cannons behind the net. The previously cartridge-loaded cannons are connected by an electrical circuit to a firing box in a hide which may be some distance away, though with a good view of the catching area. After setting, the net is often concealed with sand, seaweed or other light debris.
- Setting up the catch. If the birds do not fly or walk readily into the catching area of the net when coming in to roost, it may be necessary, through the judicious placement and movement of people or vehicles, to encourage the birds to move into position where they can be safely caught. Team members coordinate their efforts through radio contact.
- Firing. The net is fired when it is judged that an appropriate number of birds is catchable, and that none will be endangered during firing. The number of birds caught should not exceed the capacity of the team to deal with them expeditiously.
- Extraction. The birds are extracted as speedily as possible from the net and placed in temporary fabric holding cages to await processing in a sheltered environment. Depending on weather conditions, shadecloth may be used to cover the holding cages. The aim is to minimise stress to the birds.
- Processing. This includes the attachment of individually numbered bands to the birds' legs, sometimes with site-specific colour-bands, plastic leg-flags, or light level geolocators to track migration routes. Measurements are made of wing-length, head and bill length, weight, as well as degree of moult or signs of breeding plumage. Retraps of previously caught birds have their band numbers recorded and are similarly processed. Evidence of age is noted in order to estimate seasonal breeding success. Sometimes blood samples or cloacal or tracheal swabs are taken for epidemiological studies, such as government programs monitoring the incidence of avian influenza. All data are logged on field datasheets and later entered on a computer database. Details of catch conditions are also recorded. Following processing, all birds are released.

=== Modifications ===
Over the years, biologists have modified this basic set up to catch various animals (Schemnitz et al. 2012). Portable platforms have been built to capture birds over open water. Boxes have been modified to capture wild turkey. Rocket nets have been fired from portable platforms to capture birds in water.
