= Hugh S. Legaré =

American politician (1797–1843)

Hugh Legaré
- Posthumous portrait by John Mix Stanley after Edward Dalton Marchant, c. 1858

Acting United States Secretary of State
- In office May 9, 1843 – June 20, 1843
- President: John Tyler
- Preceded by: Daniel Webster
- Succeeded by: William S. Derrick (ad interim)

16th United States Attorney General
- In office September 13, 1841 – June 20, 1843
- President: John Tyler
- Preceded by: John J. Crittenden
- Succeeded by: John Nelson

Member of the U.S. House of Representatives from South Carolina's 1st district
- In office March 4, 1837 – March 3, 1839
- Preceded by: Henry L. Pinckney
- Succeeded by: Isaac E. Holmes

Acting United States Minister to Belgium Chargé d'Affaires
- In office September 25, 1832 – June 9, 1836
- President: Andrew Jackson
- Preceded by: Position established
- Succeeded by: Virgil Maxcy

7th Attorney General of South Carolina
- In office November 27, 1830 – November 29, 1832
- Governor: James Hamilton Jr.
- Preceded by: James L. Petigru
- Succeeded by: Robert Barnwell Rhett

Member of the South Carolina House of Representatives
- In office 1824-1830
- In office 1820-1821

Personal details
- Born: Hugh Swinton Legaré; January 2, 1797 Charleston, South Carolina, U.S.
- Died: June 20, 1843 (aged 46) Boston, Massachusetts, U.S.
- Party: Democratic
- Relatives: James Matthews Legaré (cousin)
- Education: University of South Carolina, Columbia (BA)

Hugh Swinton Legaré (/lɪˈɡriː/ lih-GREE; January 2, 1797 – June 20, 1843) was an American lawyer, diplomat and politician from South Carolina who served as the 16th United States Attorney General under President John Tyler.

Legaré served as Attorney General of South Carolina from 1830 to 1832 before President Andrew Jackson appointed him as the acting minister to the new Kingdom of Belgium. On his return to the United States, he was elected to represent Charleston in the United States House of Representatives but lost re-election to Isaac E. Holmes.

Following the 1841 death of President William Henry Harrison and the resignation of Whigs from the cabinet, Legaré was named United States Attorney General by John Tyler. He served as Attorney General until his death in office on June 20, 1843. For the final month of his life, Legaré also served as United States Secretary of State ad interim following the resignation of Daniel Webster.

Legaré was part of South Carolina's antebellum planter class, and, as such, a slave owner. He was aware of the evils of slavery, writing "I have a just partiality for all our [slave] servants from many touching recollections & expect my residence at home to be made very comfortable by having them about me. This circumstance is perhaps a great compensation for the unquestionable evils attendant upon the institution of slavery."

== Life and career ==
Legaré was born in Charleston, South Carolina, of Huguenot and Scottish ancestry.

Partly due to his inability to share in the amusements of his fellows, as a result of a vaccine-related deformity suffered before he was five that permanently stunted the growth and development of his legs, Legaré was an eager student. He was president of the Clariosophic Society at the College of South Carolina (now University of South Carolina at Columbia), from which he graduated in 1814 with the highest rank in his class and with a reputation for scholarship and eloquence.

After graduation, he studied the law for three years, did advanced work in Paris and Edinburgh in 1818 and 1819 and in 1822 was admitted to the South Carolina bar.

=== Political career ===
After practicing for a time in Charleston, Legaré became a member of the South Carolina House of Representatives, serving between 1820 and 1821 and then again between 1824 and 1830. He also founded and edited the Southern Review between 1828 and 1832.

From 1830 until 1832 he was the Attorney General of South Carolina, supporting states' rights and, as a strong Unionist, strongly opposed nullification. .

He served as Attorney General until he was appointed chargé d'affaires to Brussels in 1832, serving there until 1836. In 1838, he was elected as a member of the American Philosophical Society.

On his return he was elected to the 25th Congress as a Democrat, but failed in a re-election bid the following term. In 1841 President John Tyler named him Attorney General of the United States and he served in that office until his death. After Daniel Webster resigned as Secretary of State, Legaré served in that post ad interim, from May 8, 1843, until his death.

== Death ==
Legaré died in Boston while attending ceremonies for the unveiling of the Bunker Hill Monument. His death was caused by "internal strangulation...the twisting of the intestine upon itself." He was first interred in Mount Auburn Cemetery in Cambridge, Massachusetts, and was later re-interred in Magnolia Cemetery in Charleston.

== Legacy ==
The USCGC Legare, which is a medium endurance cutter, was named in his honor.

Legal offices
Preceded by John J. Crittenden	U.S. Attorney General; Served under: John Tyler; 1841–1843	Succeeded by John Nelson
U.S. House of Representatives
Preceded by Henry L. Pinckney	Member of the U.S. House of Representatives from South Carolina's 1st congressional district 1837–1839	Succeeded by Isaac E. Holmes
Diplomatic posts
Preceded by Position established	U.S. Chargé d'Affaires to Belgium; 1832–1836	Succeeded by Virgil Maxcy
