= James Matthews Legaré =

American poet (1823–1859)

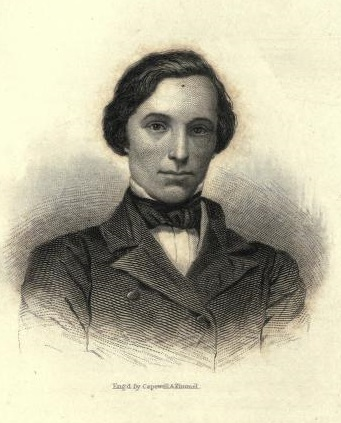
Circa 1855

James Matthews Legaré (November 26, 1823 in Charleston, South Carolina – March 30, 1859 in Aiken, South Carolina) was an American poet and inventor.

He was a relative of Hugh S. Legaré. He was by profession an inventor, artist, and author, but whose ill health prevented the commercialization of his devices. He contributed poetry to magazines, and published a single volume, Orta-Undis and other poems in 1848.

== Biography ==
Born in Charleston, South Carolina, Legaré was the son of John D. Legaré, the founding editor of the farm journal Southern Agriculturalist, as well as the librarian of the Agricultural Society of South Carolina from 1828 to 1830, and Mary Doughty Mathewes. He attended the College of Charleston in 1841 before transferring the following year at St. Mary’s college in Baltimore, Maryland, to be closer to his cousin, Hugh S. Legaré who was then serving as the United States Attorney General.

=== St. Mary's College ===
While at St. Mary’s, he studied ancient and modern languages as well as mathematics and chemistry. Although he did not graduate, he received an honorary certificate and won premiums in the individual subjects of rhetoric, natural history, astronomy, Spanish, German, and painting in oil. Following his cousin’s death in 1843, he returned to Charleston.

=== Charleston, South Carolina (Before Pulmonary Tuberculosis) ===
Upon his return to Charleston, he began to work as a law clerk in the offices of James L. Petrigru, although he did not continue in the field namely due to disinclination and poor health. and exhibiting his paintings to local exhibitions and submitting poems to local periodicals. During this time, he began experiencing lung hemorrhages, giving early indication of pulmonary tuberculosis. In favor of healthier climate and greater financial opportunity, he moved with his parents to Aiken, South Carolina.

=== Aiken, South Carolina ===
While living in Aiken, Legaré tried various pathways to earn money and enhance his reputation. One such project was setting up a painting school for young women in the area, which would bring him many admirers including his future wife, Anne Andrews of Georgia. He also spent most of his time and energy on mechanical invention. Such developments included a new type of encaustic tile, an inexpensive glazier’s putty, and a material he called "lignine" or "plastic cotton" from which he fashioned shingles and furniture, as well as sculptures. Several of his furniture pieces are in the permanent collection of the Charleston Museum. The following commentary regarding the collection is taken from the Bulletin of the Charleston Museum: "The decoration on this furniture is very elaborate and furniture and decorations are both in good state of preservation. The interest attached to them is due to the fact that the decoration is of cotton. Rendered plastic by a chemical process invented by Mr. Legare and stained walnut color, the cotton presents the appearance of wood and seems to be quite durable."

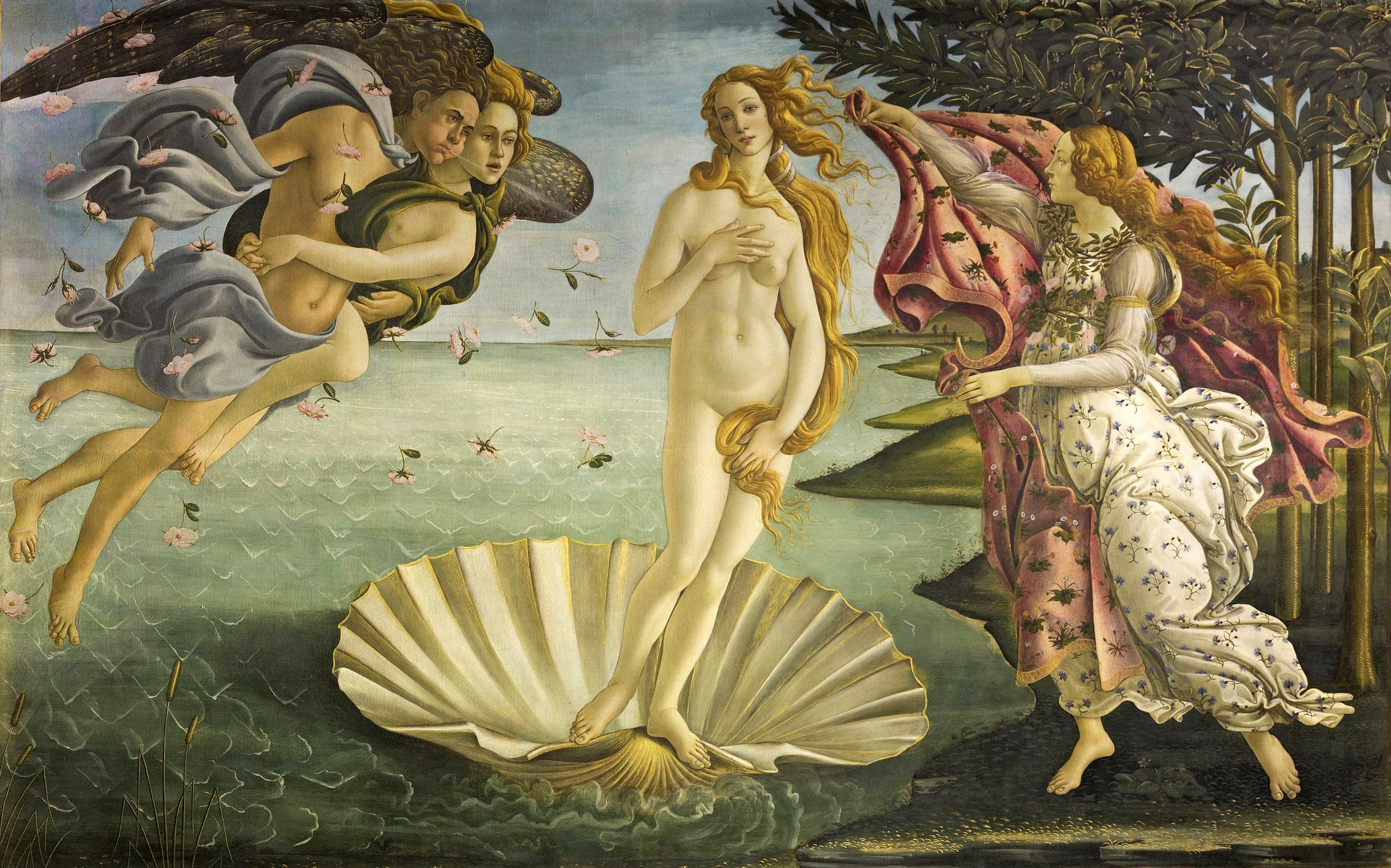
The rough translation of Orta-Undis is probably a reference to the famous painting The Birth of Venus by Italian Renaissance artist Sandro Botticelli.

Legaré sought recognition for his poetry and fiction, publishing Orta-Undis and other Poems in 1848. The rough translation "sprung from waves" is probably a reference to the painting "The Birth of Venus". It was published by William Davis Ticknor in Boston. It attracted good reviews, including the endorsement of Henry Wadsworth Longfellow. He also published seventeen stories in popular periodicals, including The Knickerbocker, Graham’s Magazine, and Putnam’s Magazine.

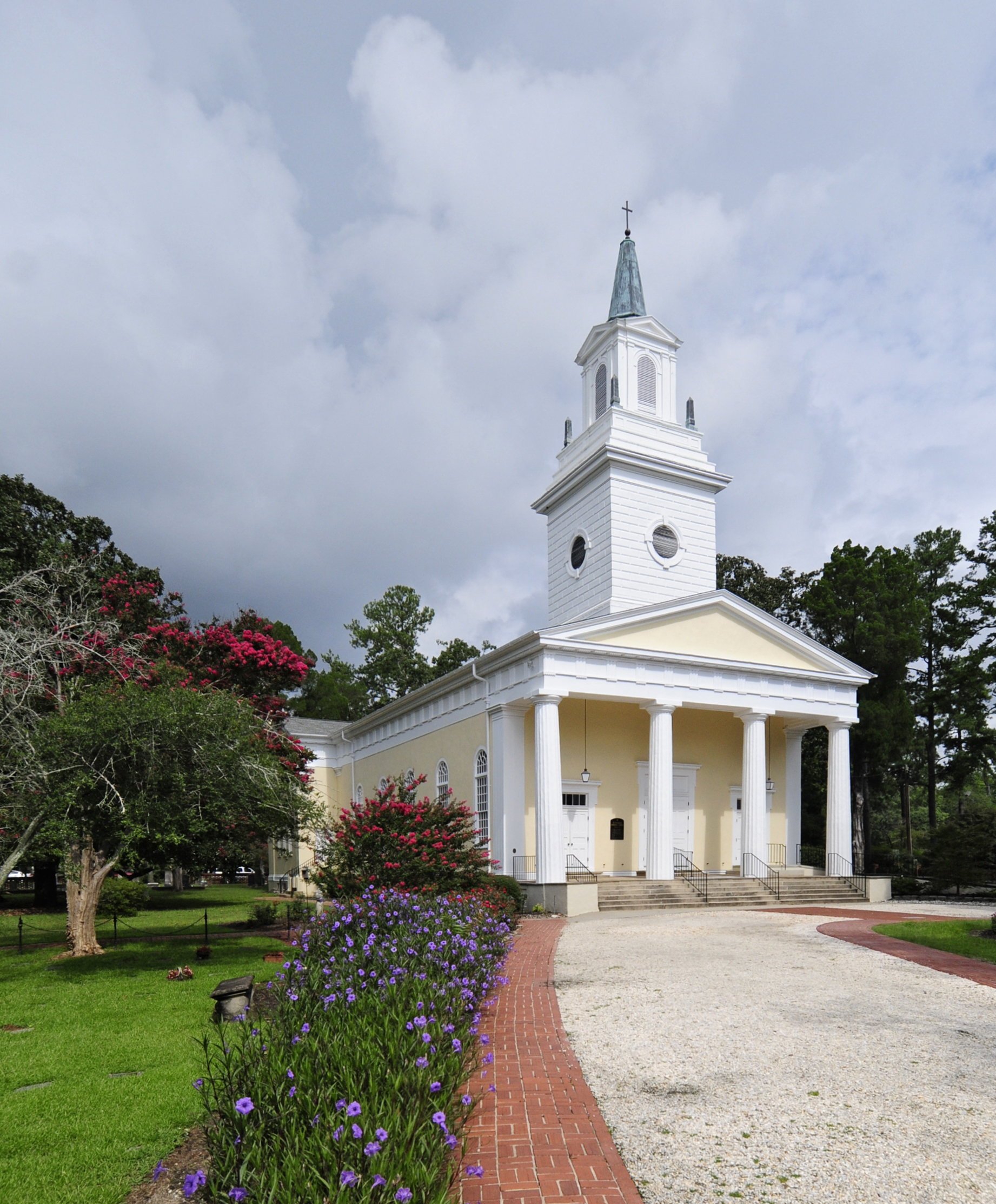
A view of St. Thaddeus Episcopal Church, where Legaré is buried.

When he died in 1859, most of his inventions remained untried. He was buried in the churchyard of St. Thaddeus Episcopal Church in Aiken, with a grave marked by a memorial stone financed by local high school students in 1942.

=== The Legaré-Morgan House and legacy ===
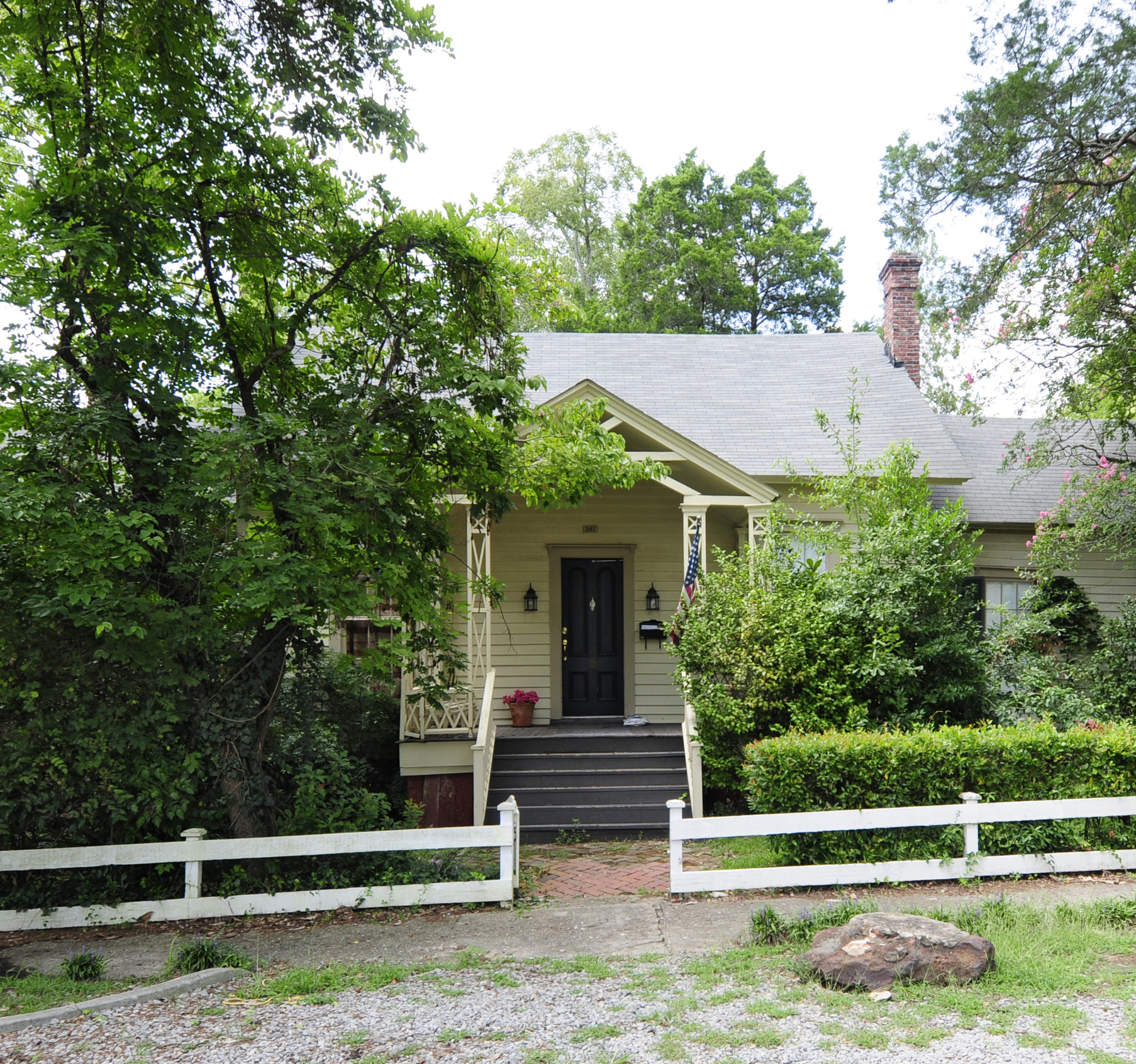
The Legaré-Morgan House, photo credited to Bill Fitzpatrick.

Legaré lived in a small one-story home in Aiken, South Carolina, between 1850 and 1859. While there, he built an addition to the house to use as a studio for his art and inventing as a separate building, but it was later moved to be a part of the main structure. Legaré’s family sold the property to Thomas C. Morgan in 1870, and his descendants continue to live there until the time of its nomination. Legaré’s poetry is studied today mostly in South Carolina, especially in Aiken, where he spent the last years of his life.

== Orta-Undis and Other Poems ==
Orta-Undis and Other Poems was Legaré’s only published volume of poetry. It establishes him as a southern poet in the Romantic tradition. His work was inspired by contemporary poets of his time like Henry Wadsworth Longfellow and Edgar Allan Poe. Critics of his poems during his lifetime gave high remarks for his works describing the southern landscape, especially those with the description of the native flora: "Haw-Blossoms" and "To Jasmines in December." Praise was also given to his poem "Ornithologoi" (Bird Voices), which celebrates birdsong and laments the practice of shooting birds for sport.

The dedication page in Orta-Undis is made out to his wife:

"To Her

Whose virtues and earnest affection are the pride and happiness of my life;

To the ‘sweetest rose of Georgia,

I dedicate this little volume."

The poems within the volume comprise a definite Romantic Era feeling: topics range from nature’s majesty (Haw-Blossoms) to the idea of feminine purity (To a Lilly) to the wealth of the soul (Que Carior?)

Orta-Undis was printed by Thurston Torry & Co. for the publishing house of William D. Ticknor. 500 copies were printed to cost Ticknor 20 cents (adjusted for inflation, this would be $6.44 in 2019), and sold at 50 cents a copy ($16.09 in 2019), and a 10 percent commission account was risked by Legaré. The volume received mixed reviews from critics, many of whom had differing opinions with some praising Legaré’s work, and others frowning on it. It did not print and sell well, as he only collected around $23 ($740.08 in 2019 when adjusted for inflation). After his death in the early 1900s, his work underwent a local renaissance that was both critical and biographical.

In 1971, Curtis Carroll Davis published a biography of Legaré, That Ambitious Mr. Legaré (U of South Carolina P, 1971). The second part of the book contains his collected poetry. Reviewer Blackburn Hughes, Jr. remarked, "The poetry that forms the second portion of the book is probably the key to the reason James Legare is not a well-known figure."
