= Daniel Legare House =

Historic building in Charleston, South Carolina, U.S.

Coordinates: 32.785666°N 79.931581°W

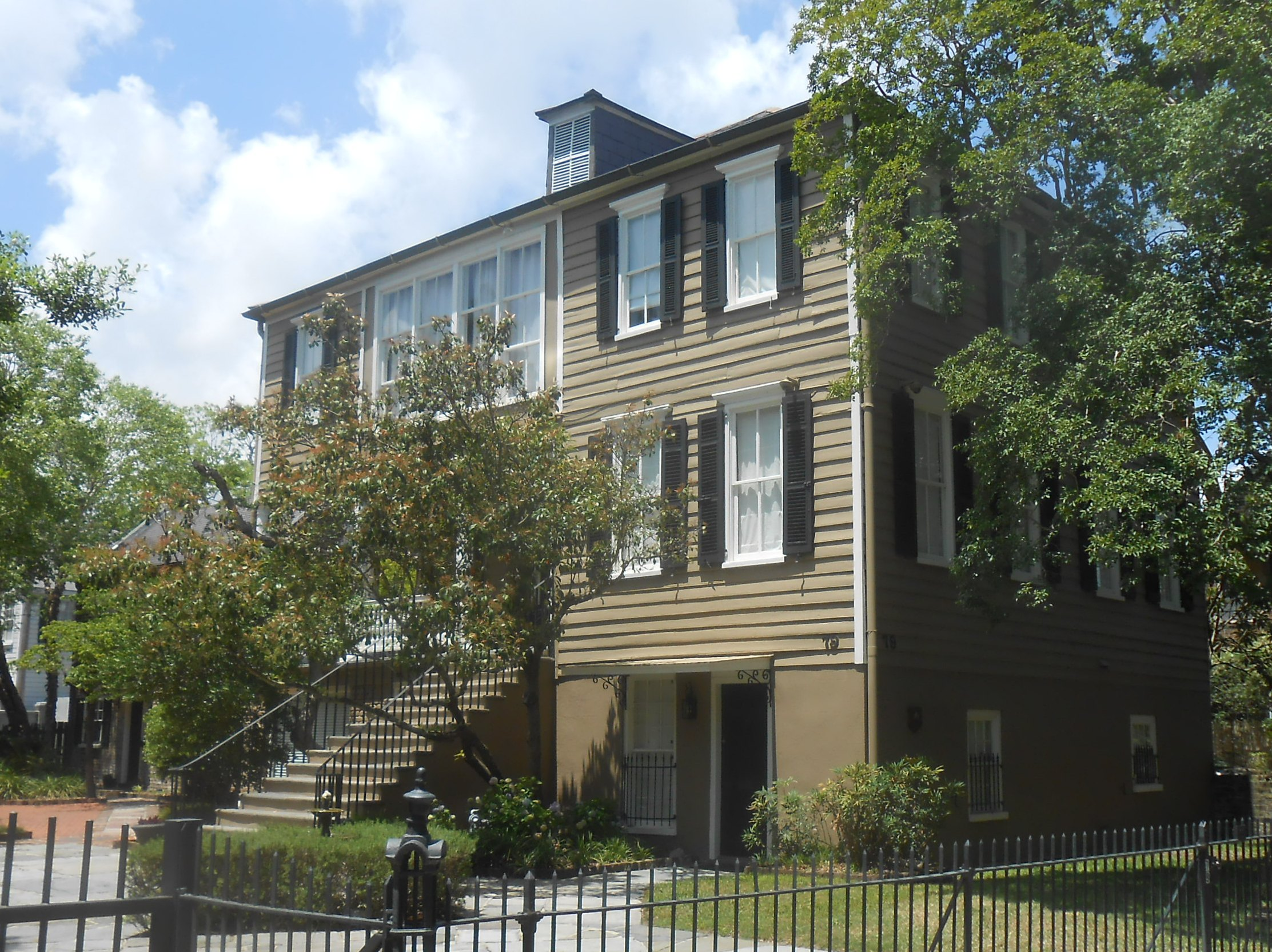
The Daniel Legare House is at 79 Anson Street.

The Daniel Legare House is the oldest surviving house in the historic Ansonborough area of Charleston, South Carolina. The land upon which the house was built was sold to Daniel Crawford in May 1745 for a price that was much lower than expected for a house at the time, thereby suggesting a construction date after that time. The house was finished and named after Daniel Legare, a local planter and congressman.

== History ==
When Crawford's estate sold the property in 1760, the deed included a reference to buildings on the grounds. Details about the house suggest two different construction periods. For example, there are breaks in the vertical woodwork between the second (main entrance) floor and the third floor, suggesting that the third floor is a later addition. Daniel Crawford possibly erected the roughly finished basement and first floor of the house while Daniel Legare, a man of means, perhaps expanded the house by adding the upper floor. Daniel Legare, was a representative to the first provincial congress of SC.

Later owners included Bishop William May Wightman. Wightman served as the first president of Wofford College.

As of November 2025, it is still privately owned.
