= Daniel Legare =

South Carolina merchant and politician

Daniel Legare Sr.
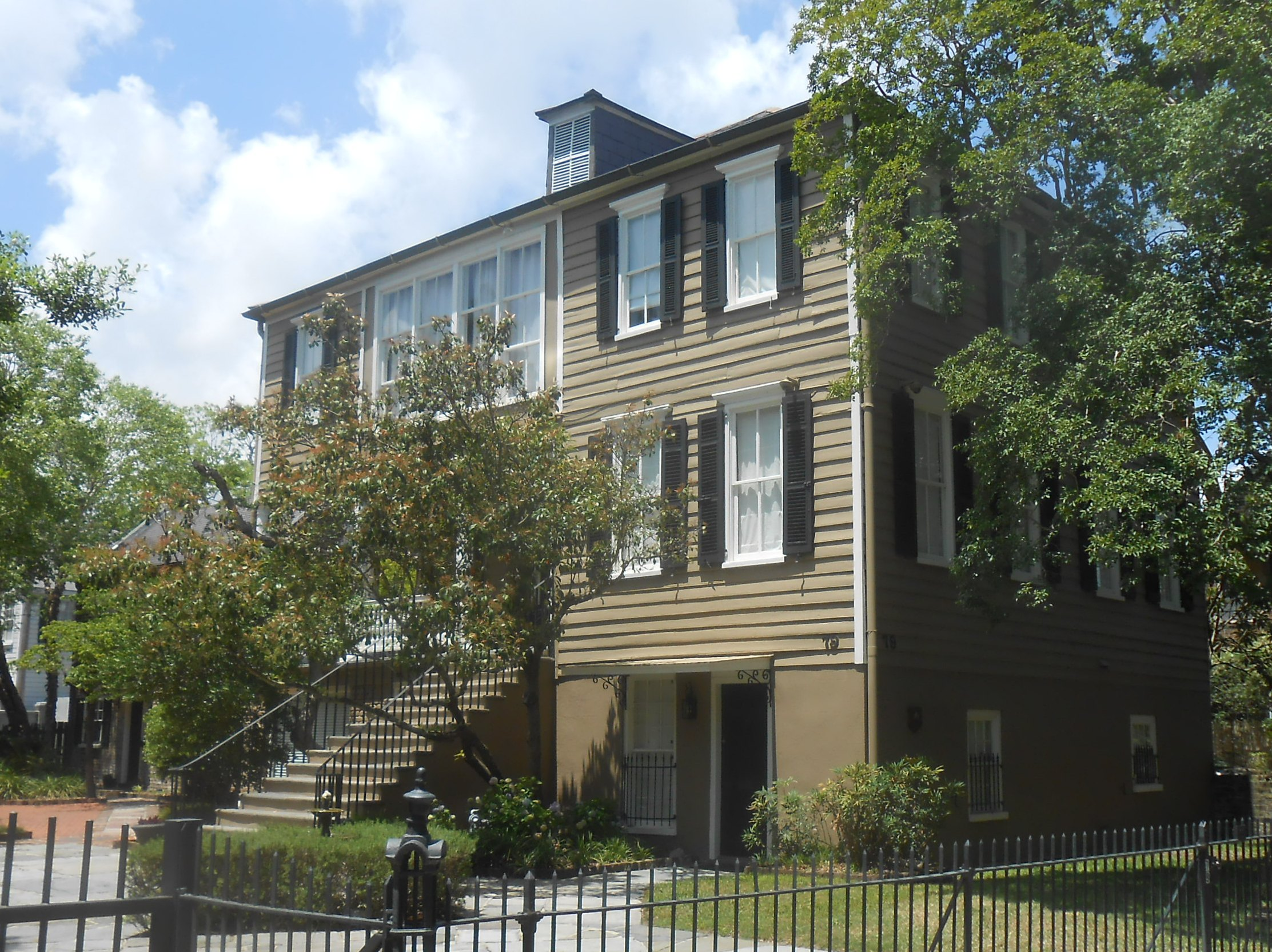
- Daniel Legare house on 79 Anson Street, Charleston, South Carolina

State Representative to the 1st South Carolina Provincial Congress
- In office January 11, 1775 – June 22, 1775

Personal details
- Born: 13 December 1708 Charleston, South Carolina, United States
- Died: 7 December 1790 (aged 81) Charleston, South Carolina, United States
- Party: Patriot (American Revolution)
- Spouse(s): Mary Hall; Frances Thomas
- Occupation: Merchant; Politician

Daniel Legare Sr. was an American merchant and politician, who served on the First Provincial Congress of South Carolina in 1775. He was also a dry goods merchant whose family was very influential in South Carolina society during the eighteenth century. His house in Charleston, the Daniel Legare House, still stands, being the oldest home in its neighborhood.

== Early life ==
Daniel Legare was born to Francis Solomon Legare and Sarah Norman in Charleston, South Carolina. He married his first wife, Mary Hall, in 1730 and they had at least 3 children together. His fathers family were French Huguenots and his mothers family were English. He worked as a dry goods merchant and as a planter, amassing a considerable amount of wealth and influence. Around 1760, he purchased a property in Charleston, South Carolina that was partially constructed at the time, a house which became the Daniel Legare House on 79 Anson St. in Charleston. Today it is the oldest house in its area still standing.

== First Provincial Congress ==
In 1775 as tensions with the British grew, South Carolina organized a Congress in Charleston to coordinate opposition to British Rule. Daniel Legare Sr. was elected as a delegate representing the parishes of St. Philip and St. Michael in Charleston to this first Provincial Congress. The Provincial Congress acted as a revolutionary alternative to the British colonial legislature, drafting petitions and beginning the shift toward independence.

== Later life and Legacy ==
He remained active in his community later in life, serving in several roles in his church. He died in 1790, having a contemporary account written of him saying Contemporary accounts describe him as "a zealous and steady friend of this country, and of the equal rights of mankind,". He is a 2nd great-grandfather of Richard Morrison II and a 3rd great-grandfather father of James B. Morrison.
