= Bennett Place =

Historic house in North Carolina, United States

- Bennett Place State Historic Site
- U.S. National Register of Historic Places
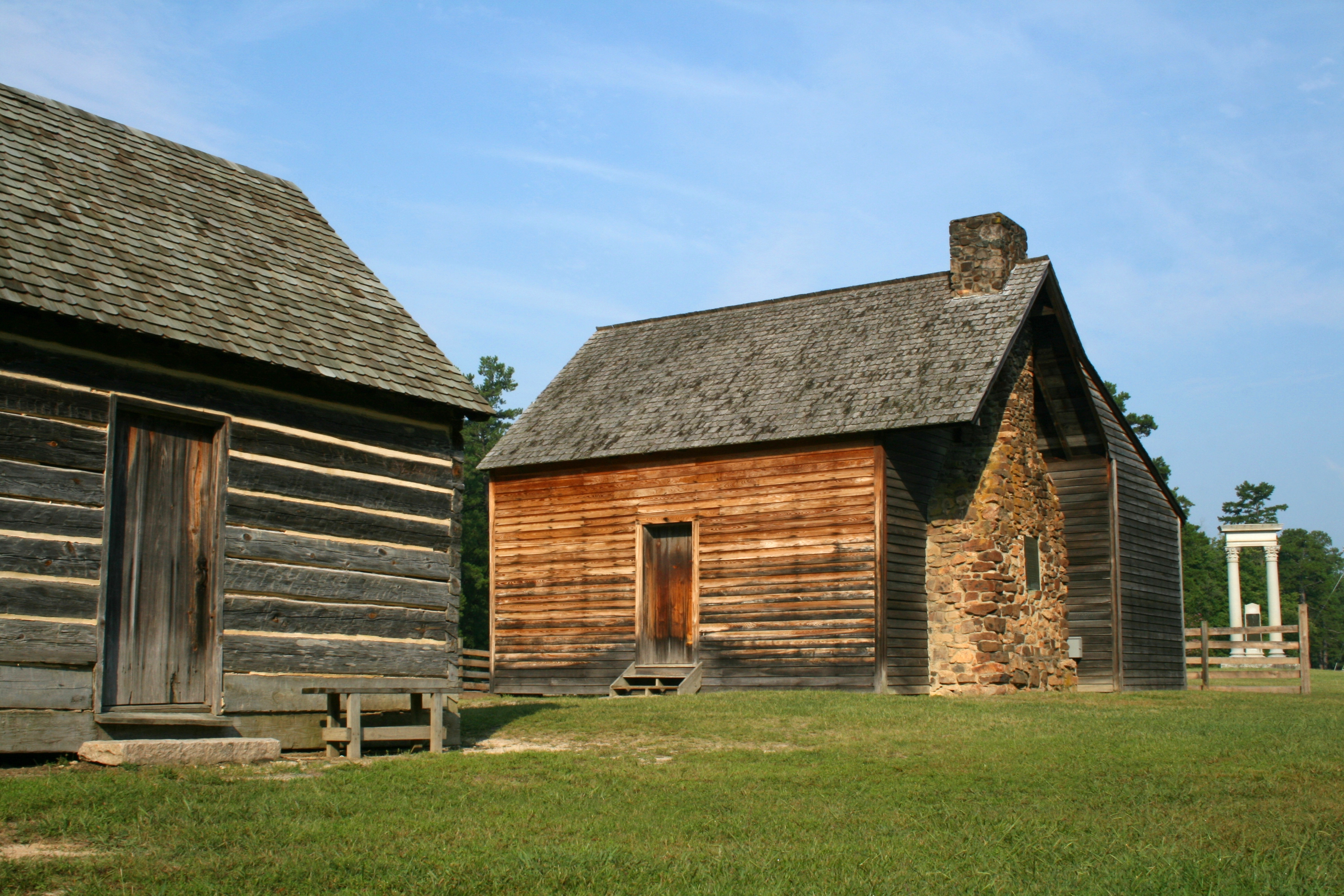

- Location within North Carolina Location within the United States
- Location: 4409 Bennett Memorial Rd., Durham, North Carolina
- Coordinates: 36°1′45″N 78°58′32″W
- Area: 30.5 acres (12.3 ha)
- Built: 1789
- NRHP reference No.: 70000452
- Added to NRHP: February 26, 1970

Bennett Place is a former farm and homestead in Durham, North Carolina, which was the site of the last surrender of a major Confederate army in the American Civil War, when Joseph E. Johnston surrendered to William T. Sherman. The first meeting (April 17, 1865) saw Sherman agreeing to certain political demands by the Confederates, which were promptly rejected by the Union cabinet in Washington. Another meeting had to be held (April 26) to agree on military terms only, in line with Robert E. Lee’s recent surrender to Ulysses S. Grant. This effectively ended the war.

== History ==
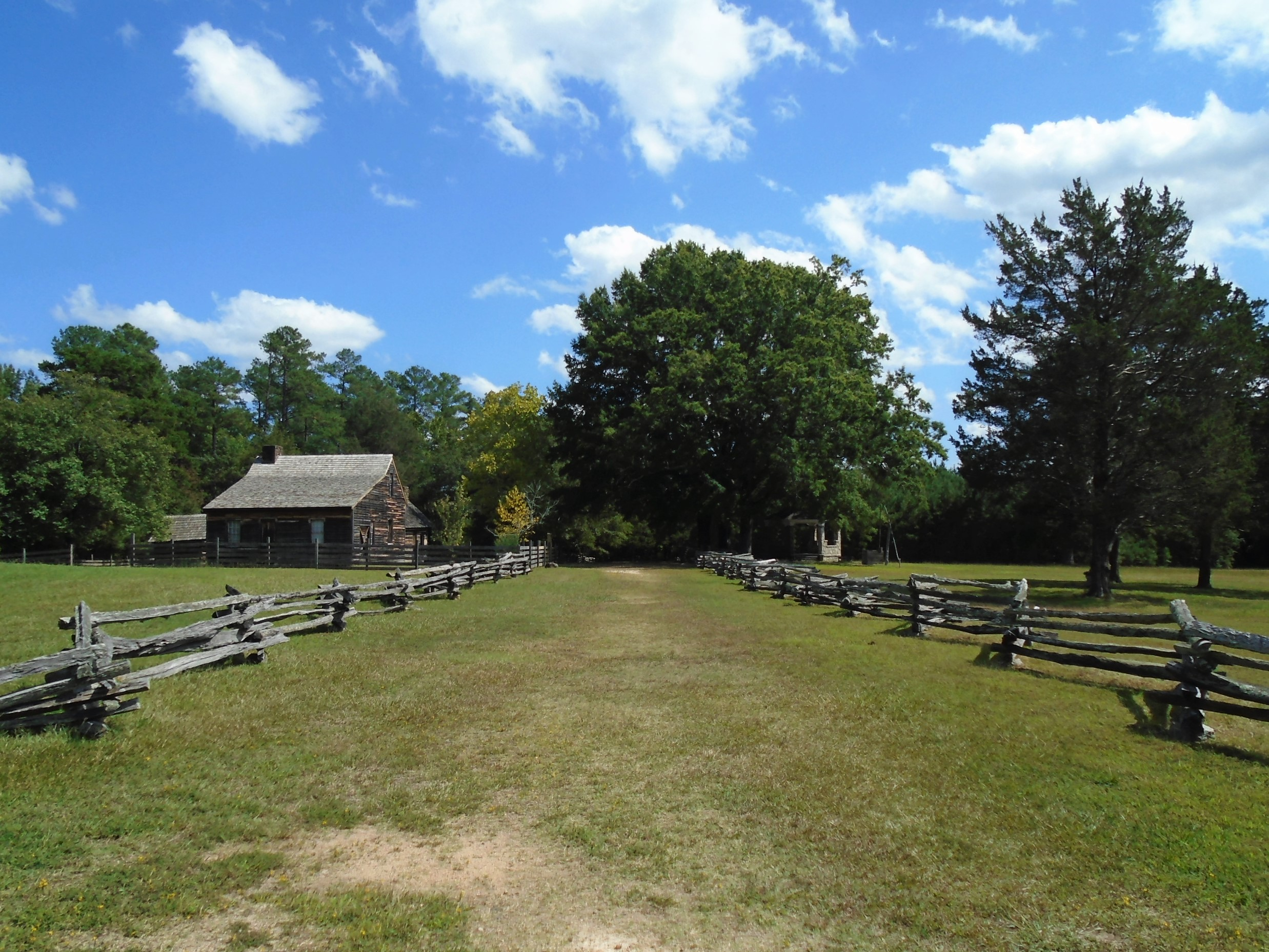
Original road connecting Durham Station and Hillsborough, NC. The Confederate General Johnston and Union General Sherman met on this road and asked the Bennett family if they could use their house to hold a meeting to discuss terms of surrender.

After Maj. Gen. William Tecumseh Sherman's March to the Sea, he turned north through the Carolinas for the Carolinas campaign. Confederate President Jefferson Davis met his General Joseph E. Johnston in Greensboro, North Carolina, while Sherman had stopped in Raleigh.

Robert E. Lee's beleaguered Army of Northern Virginia surrendered to Ulysses S. Grant at Appomattox Court House on April 9, 1865. Though Davis wished strongly to continue the war, Johnston sent a courier to the Union troops encamped at Morrisville Station, with a message to General Sherman, offering a meeting between the lines to discuss a truce. Johnston's army was still an active fighting force with an available line of retreat along which, according to Davis, "ample supplies" had been placed.

Johnston, escorted by a detachment of about 60 troopers of the 5th South Carolina Cavalry Regiment, traveled east along the Hillsborough Road toward Durham Station in Durham, Orange County. Sherman was riding west to meet him, with an escort of 200 men from the 9th and 13th Pennsylvania, 8th Indiana and 2nd Kentucky Cavalry. The farm of James and Nancy Bennett at Bennett Place, sometimes known as Bennett Farm, was a convenient place for privacy.

The first day's discussion (April 17) was intensified by the telegram Sherman handed to Johnston, informing of the assassination of President Abraham Lincoln. They met the following day, April 18, and signed terms of surrender. However, on April 24, Grant arrived and informed Sherman that the terms had been rejected by the presidential cabinet in Washington because they exceeded the terms that Grant had given Lee and included civil matters. The opposing generals met again on April 26, 1865, and with the assistance of Gen. John M. Schofield, agreed to new terms omitting the controversial sections. The agreement disbanded all active Confederate forces in North Carolina, South Carolina, Georgia, and Florida, totaling 89,270 soldiers, which was the largest group to surrender during the Civil War.

== Largest surrender of the American Civil War ==
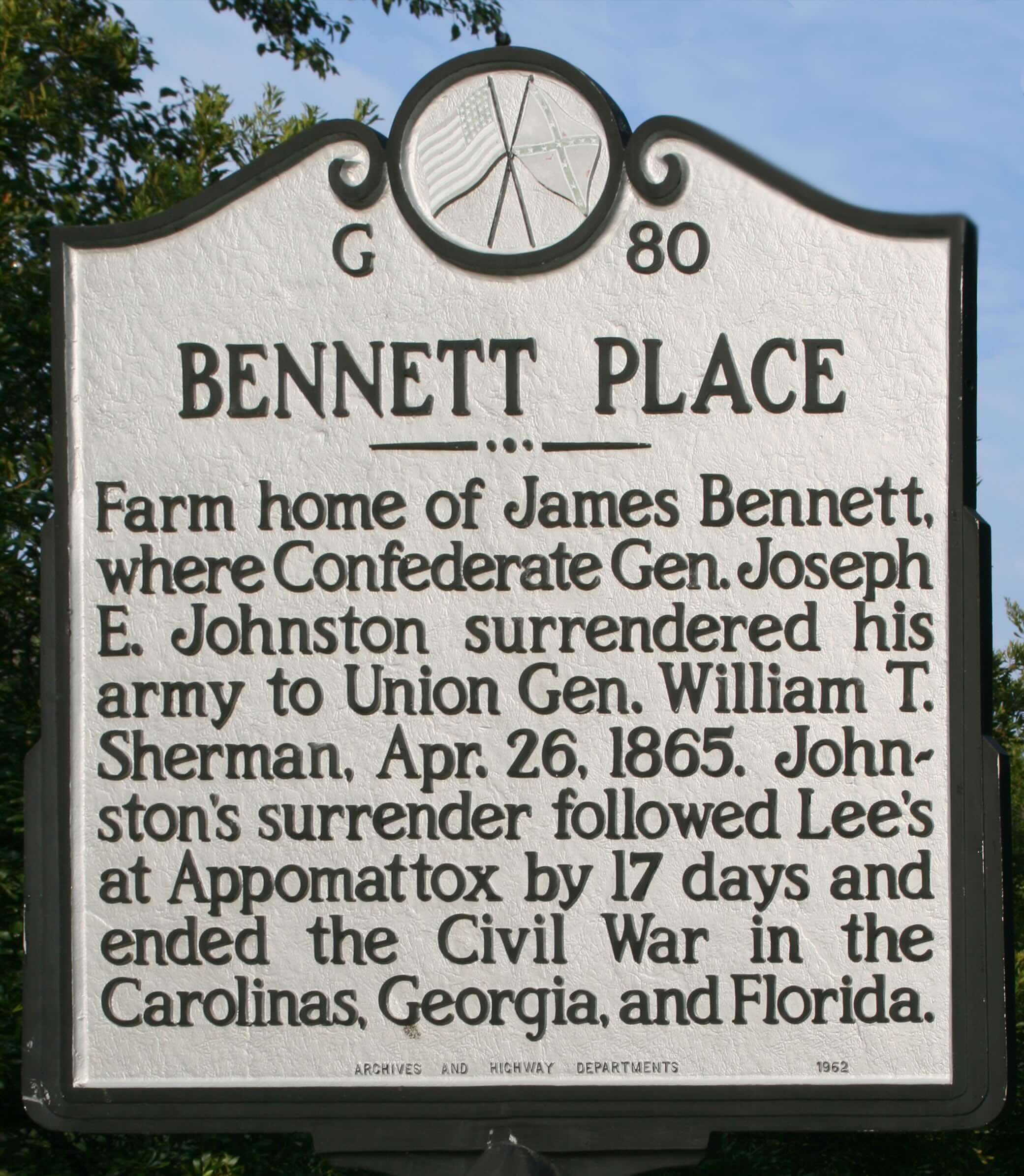
The Bennett Place marker

The difficulty in reaching a surrender agreement lay in part in Johnston's desire, influenced by President Davis, for more than the purely military surrender that Major General Sherman offered. Sherman's original terms matched those offered by Lt. General Ulysses S. Grant to General Robert E. Lee at Appomattox Court House, Virginia, but Johnston along with General John C. Breckinridge, also serving as Secretary of War for the Confederacy, insisted on resolutions of political issues, including the reestablishment of state governments, return of some weapons to state arsenals and civil rights after the war. Sherman, in accordance with Lincoln's stated overall wishes for a compassionate and forgiving end to the war, agreed on terms that included the political issues. Sherman was unaware that on March 3, Lincoln had given Grant orders to discuss only military matters with Lee. Lincoln was later assassinated.

After reading the original Sherman–Johnston terms of surrender, United States Secretary of War Edwin M. Stanton, taking a position in accordance with Lincoln's instructions to Grant, persuaded a unanimous Federal cabinet to reject the terms. Sherman was instructed to call Johnston back to the table and request the military surrender of Johnston's army. In response, Jefferson Davis ordered Johnston to disband his infantry and escape with his mounted troops. However, Johnston disobeyed his orders and agreed to meet again with Major General Sherman at Bennett Farm. The second negotiation session took place on April 26, 1865. The opposing generals agreed to new military surrender terms that were substantially identical to the ones Grant had given to Lee, supplemented with corollary implementation terms written by Schofield pertaining to rations and return of the paroled soldiers to their homes. The surrender agreement ended the war for the 89,270 soldiers in North Carolina, South Carolina, Georgia, and Florida. Three more primary surrenders would follow in Citronelle, Alabama; Galveston, Texas; and Doaksville, Oklahoma.

== Bennett Place State Historic Site ==
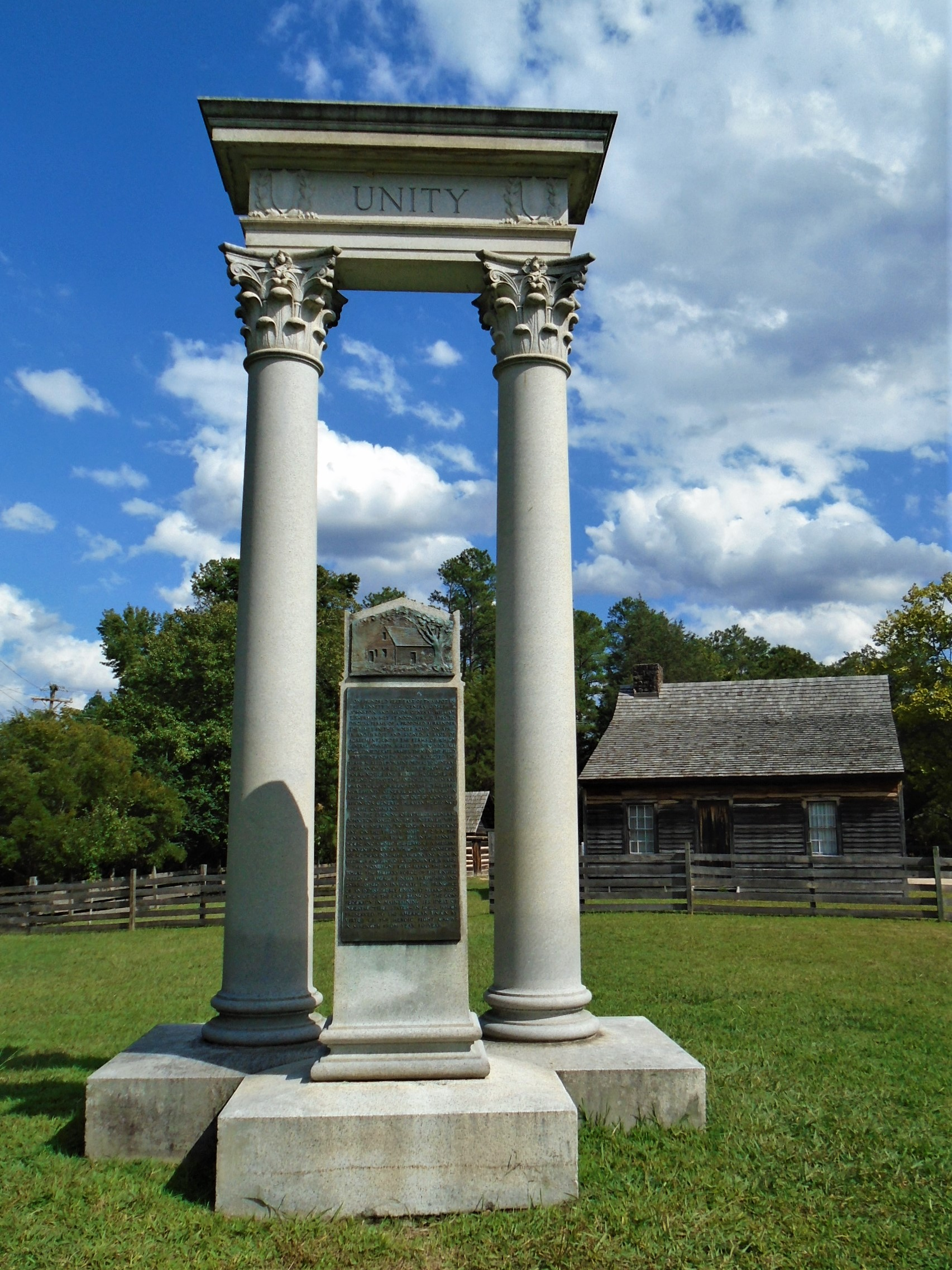
Unity Monument at Bennett Place

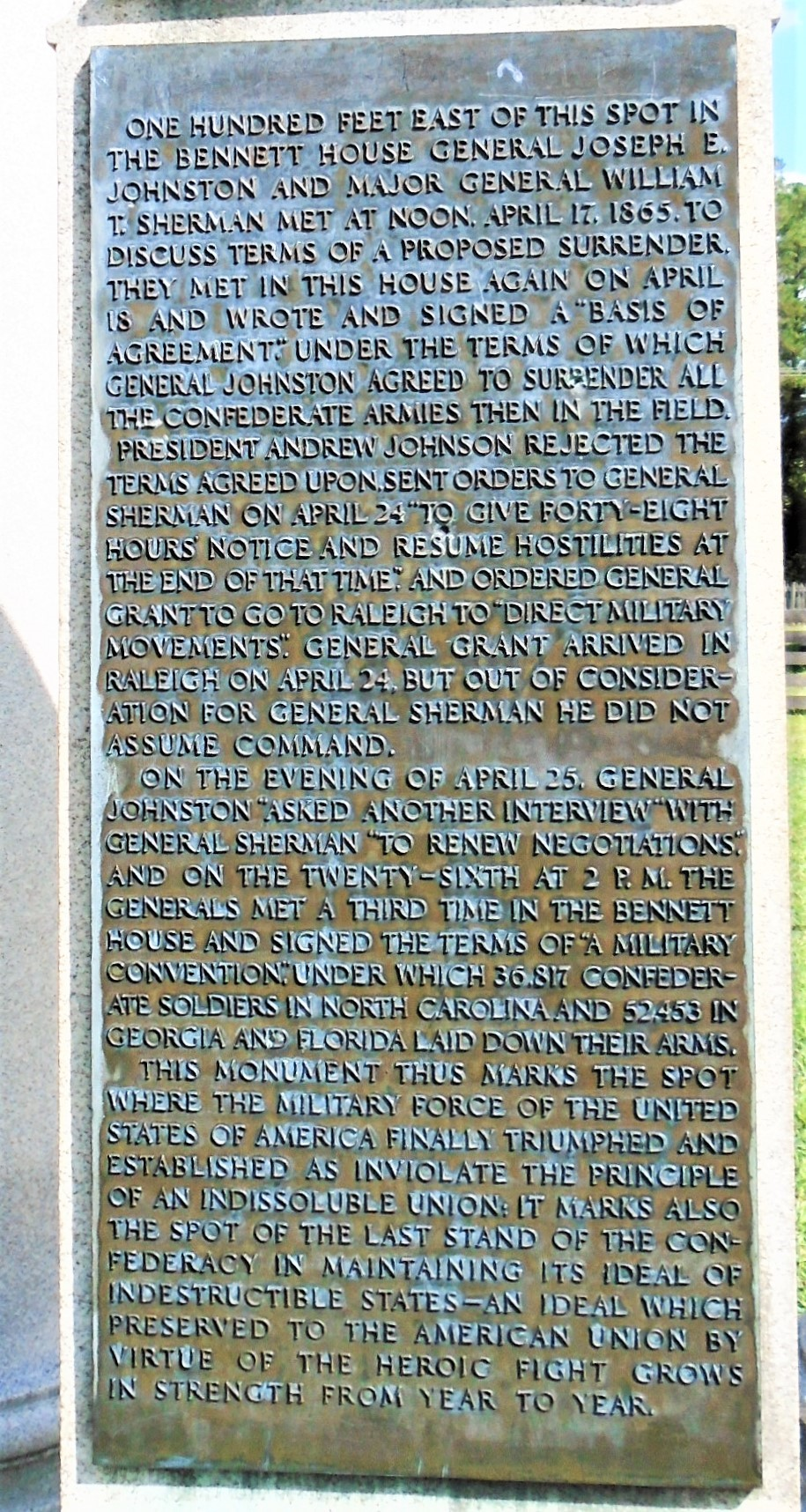
Unity Monument Inscription

James and Nancy Bennett, owners of the meeting place, were simple yeoman farmers who had suffered tremendously during the four years of war. They lost a son and son-in-law: Lorenzo, who served in the 27th North Carolina, buried in Winchester, Virginia; and their daughter Eliza's husband, Robert Duke, who died in a Confederate Army hospital and is buried in Lynchburg, Virginia. Their 3rd child, Alfonzo, was not in the war but died during the Civil War years (1864). The Bennetts never fully recovered from the war, and in 1878, James Bennett died and the family moved to the new community of Durham to begin a life without him.

The farm was abandoned and fell into ruin; a fire finally destroyed the farmhouse in 1921. In 1923 the Unity monument was dedicated on the site. Among the many contributors to the preservation of this historic landmark were the Duke, Everett, and Morgan families.

In 1960 the site was fully reclaimed and restored by local preservationists. It was reconstructed as a two-story log structure covered by weatherboards with a gable roof and a shed addition. Also on the property are a log kitchen and smokehouse. It was then turned over to the State of North Carolina and made a state historic site.

The Bennett Place State Historic Site now belongs to the North Carolina Department of Natural and Cultural Resources and is located in the west end of Durham, near Duke University. The site is open to the public, Tuesday-Saturday, 9am-5pm, with a visitor center, museum, theater presentation, "Dawn of Peace", gift shop, and the reconstruction of the Bennett farm. Living history programs and the commemoration of the surrender take place throughout the year. It was listed on the National Register of Historic Places in 1970.

On April 15, 2010, the Bennett Place Historic Site unveiled a new painting by Civil War artist Dan Nance, entitled "The First Meeting". On the same day, the site gave its first William Vatavuk Scholarship, a yearly scholarship for students who wish to major in history in college. The scholarship honors the late William Vatavuk, who wrote Dawn of Peace, the first guidebook for the historic site.
