= South Carolina Provincial Congress =

Historical legislature of South Carolina

- Continental Union Flag

Type
- Type: Unicameral

History
- Founded: January 11, 1775
- Disbanded: March 26, 1776
- Succeeded by: South Carolina General Assembly

Leadership
- President of the Provincial Congress: Henry Laurens (1775–1776)
- Vice President: Christopher Gadsden (1775–1776)
- Secretary/Clerk: Richard Hutson (1775–1776)

Structure
- Authority: Governmental authority in Patriot controlled territory in South Carolina

Meeting place
- 1st Congress: Charleston; 2nd Congress: Charleston

Constitution
- Fundamental Constitutions & Constitution of 1776

The South Carolina Provincial Congress was an extralegal representative assembly that was modelled on the colony's unicameral Commons House of Assembly. It served as the transitional government that led South Carolina from a British colonial province into a U.S. state government. Prominent South Carolinians who served on the congress included Colonel Charles Pinckney, Daniel Legare, Christopher Gadsden, Richard Hutson, and Henry Laurens.

== Origins ==
As tensions rose between the Thirteen Colonies and Great Britain, the political authority in South Carolina increasingly shifted away from royal officials toward locally elected leaders. After the colonial assembly was dissolved by Royal Governor Lord William Campbell in June 1775, former members of the South Carolina Commons House of Assembly, along with the committees of correspondence, called for an extralegal representative body to govern the province and coordinate resistance to British policies. This resulted in the creation of the South Carolina Provincial Congress, an assembly that acted as the de facto government of the province during the early stages of the American Revolution.

== First Provincial Congress ==
The First Provincial Congress convened in Charleston, South Carolina, beginning 11 January 1775. It was composed of 184 delegates elected from parishes and backcountry districts. The congress was presided over initially by Colonel Charles Pinckney, with Henry Laurens leading the session later in June, with Christopher Gadsden as his vice president. Though not legally sanctioned by the British, this congress assumed legislative and executive functions, marking a turning point in state governance. Prominent landowners from around the state voiced their opinions, including Daniel Legare, who along with his peers, opted for open defiance against the British. It organized the province's defense by raising militia units and authorizing the issuance of paper currency to finance military needs. The congress also appointed a Council of Safety to act on its behalf when it was not in session. These measures helped establish the foundations of armed resistance to British authority in the province.

== Second Provincial Congress ==
Elections for a second congress were held in August 1775, and the body met for its first session on 1 November 1775, again in Charleston, South Carolina. William Henry Drayton was elected president and guided the assembly's work through both sessions. The Second Provincial Congress continued to exercise governmental authority, organizing additional militia units and refining the province's defense structure. In early February 1776, it reconvened for a second session, during which it prepared for the establishment of a formal constitutional government. On 26 March 1776, this congress adopted South Carolina's first state constitution, creating a framework for an independent republic and effectively ending the extralegal congress system.

== Functions and legacy ==
Throughout its existence, the South Carolina Provincial Congress was unicameral and combined legislative and executive responsibilities in a single body. It served as the central authority in the province after the breakdown of royal governance, organizing military defense, issuing currency, and laying the groundwork for South Carolina's transition from a colony to an independent state. Upon adopting a state constitution in March 1776, the congress was succeeded by the South Carolina General Assembly, the first formal legislative body under the new constitutional framework.

== See also ==
- South Carolina in the American Revolution
