= Eldorado Plantation =

Coordinates: 33.1559°N 79.3810°W

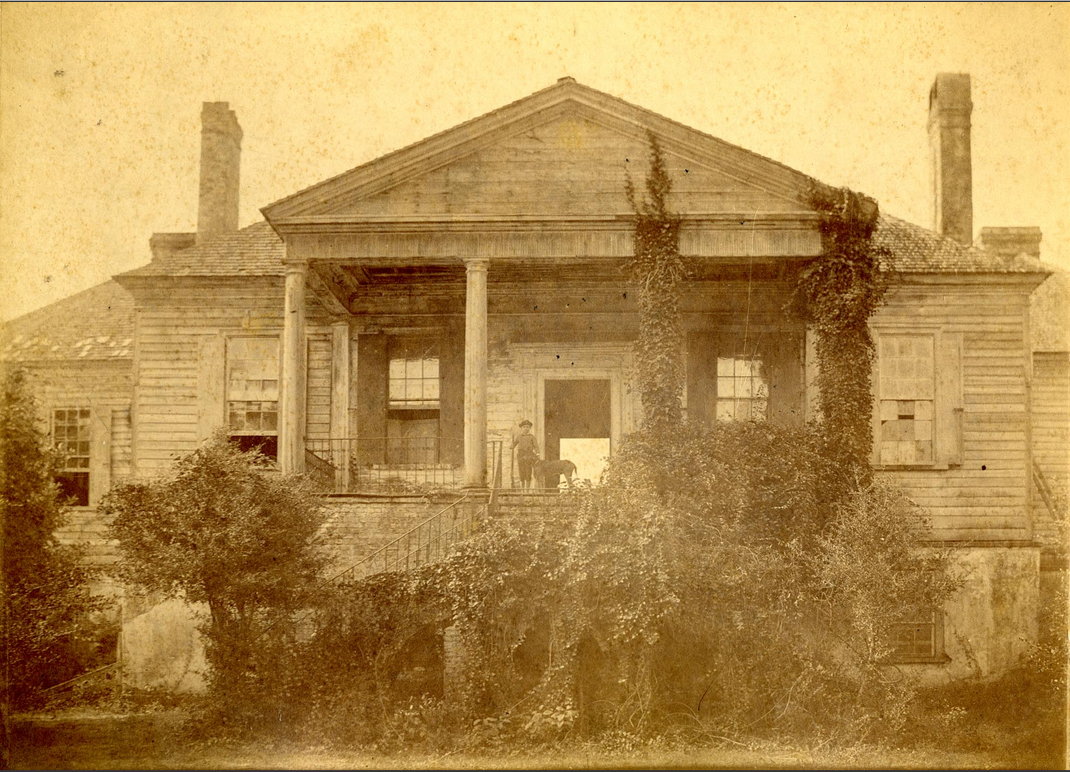
El Dorado in an 1891 picture © The Charleston Museum Archives

Eldorado Plantation was the home of Major General Thomas Pinckney and his second wife Frances Motte Middleton, it was built around 1797 in Charleston County, South Carolina. After Pinckney returned from Europe, where he had been serving as the United States minister to England and Spain, he bought a plantation on the South Santee River. His eldest son, Thomas Pinckney Jr and wife Elizabeth Izard Pinckney, took up residence at his wife Frances's family home, Fairfield Plantation, just upstream on the South Santee River.

Pinckney named his new plantation Eldorado; the name came from the golden buttercups that bloomed on the property ("El Dorado" means "the Golden" in Spanish). Pinckney used a Spanish name in memory of his time as the minister to Spain. Pinckney and his mother-in-law, Rebecca Brewton Motte, built the plantation house and developed the plantation for rice culture. She lived with him and her daughter until her death in 1815.

The house stood on the property until it burned on May 10, 1897. It was owned at the time by the grandson of General Thomas Pinckney, Capt. Thomas Pinckney, and occupied by Captain Pinckney's nephew, Hamilton Seabrook. Captain Pinckney left the property to his daughter, Josephine Pinckney, and she in turn left it to her half-brother's children. The land was later sold and today is part of the Santee National Wildlife Refuge.
