= Fort Motte =

Archaeological site in South Carolina, United States

- Fort Motte Battle Site
- U.S. National Register of Historic Places
- Location within South Carolina Location within the United States
- Location: Calhoun County, South Carolina
- Nearest city: St. Matthews, South Carolina
- Coordinates: 33°44′21″N 80°41′33″W
- Area: 5 acres (2.0 ha)
- NRHP reference No.: 72001195
- Added to NRHP: November 9, 1972

Fort Motte (Fort Motte Station) was a plantation and military site in the US state of South Carolina. It was developed first as Mt. Joseph Plantation; it was commandeered in 1780 by the British Army and fortified as a temporary military outpost in what is now South Carolina during the American Revolutionary War. It was significant for its military use as a depot for their convoys between Camden and Charleston, which they occupied. Located along the Congaree River, it is roughly 90–95 miles from Charleston by 21st-century roadways. The British fortified the big house and surrounds, and it became known as Fort Motte, after Rebecca Brewton Motte, who had been occupying it with her family. During the Patriot Siege of Fort Motte, the plantation mansion was set on fire. The British surrendered at this site.

After the war, this site was considered for the capital of the newly formed state of South Carolina, before Columbia was chosen. Fort Motte is now an unincorporated village at the nearby crossroads of SH 419 and State Road S-9-13. The former area of the plantation house and grounds is known as the Fort Motte Battlefield Site. Privately owned, it was listed in the National Register of Historic Places in 1972.

The Lang Sune Plantation was in the area and is the site of one of the African American burial grounds in Fort Motte. Political leaders Samuel L. Duncan and Edward Israel Cain were both from Fort Motte and went on to serve in the state legislature.

== History ==
The Cherokee Path is nearby, long used by indigenous peoples for trading and travel. The first Anglo-European colonists in the area were Scots and English traders, who established trading posts with the Cherokee and other regional Native American tribes. Some posts were fortified as early forts in the colonial period. Amelia Town was established in this area about 1735.

Mt. Joseph Plantation was built in 1767 as an up-country estate by Miles Brewton of Charleston, near the confluence of the Congaree and Wateree rivers. A slave trader, he owned several ships and plantations. He became one of the wealthiest men in the province before he and his family died when lost at sea in 1775 on their way to Philadelphia for him to serve as a delegate at the Second Continental Congress.

His sister Rebecca Brewton Motte (1737-1815) inherited some of his property, including Mt. Joseph. She was widowed in 1780, when her husband Jacob died of illness. After the British appropriated the Miles Brewton House for their headquarters in Charleston, Motte left the city and moved to the relative safety of Mt. Joseph Plantation, 95 miles away.

They were living there when the British took over this property. After the military took over the mansion, the Motte family moved to the overseer's house. The British fortified the big house and its grounds.

A British garrison of regular, Hessian and Provincial forces occupied the plantation, using it as a depot for their convoys running between Camden and Charleston. Waterways were still the key as transportation routes. Mt. Joseph plantation was near a strategic river crossing of the Congaree River, which gave the British access to an important chain of transport from Charleston to points north and west.

By May 1781 the British had constructed wood and earth fortifications at Mt. Joseph: palisades (9' tall) and ramparts (10-11' wide), were faced with a 6' deep ditch in front. 20-30' from the ditch was a row of abatis. Defending the fortified mansion were 184 British Regulars, Hessians, and Provincials under the command of Capt. Lt. Donald Macpherson. It became known as Fort Motte, after Rebecca Brewton Motte.

General Francis "Swamp Fox" Marion and Colonel Henry Lee laid siege to the fortified site. Rebecca Motte became known for giving Marion arrows from East India which would ignite on impact. His forces shot flaming arrows into the roof to set it on fire and drove the British from it, and shot artillery to prevent soldiers from putting out the fire. Captain Lt. McPherson surrendered. "The British surrender of the fort alarmed Lord Rawdon and hastened his retreat from Camden to Charleston."

The South Carolina Department of Archives and History, the South Carolina Library, and the University of South Carolina have the earliest extant maps for this area. When cultivation of short-staple cotton became profitable at the turn of the nineteenth century, after the invention of the cotton gin, this upland area was developed for cotton as a commodity crop. The battlefield site is listed on the National Register of Historic Places, considered important because of the military and other history from 1750-1799.

South Carolina Representative Samuel L. Duncan was born in Fort Motte. Edward I. Cain represented the area and surrounding Orangeburg County in the state legislature was buried in Fort Motte. Memorials to them were erected at the Lang Syne Cemetery to honor them and Darrell Jackson helped pass a resolution honoring them in the South Carolina General Assembly on February 8, 2023.
