= Capers-Motte House =

House in Charleston, South Carolina, US

Coordinates: 32.774526°N 79.929168°W

The Capers-Motte House is a pre-Revolutionary house at 69 Church Street in Charleston, South Carolina. The house was likely built before 1745 by Richard Capers. Later, the house purchased and became the home of Colonel Jacob Motte, who served as the treasurer of the colony for 27 years until his death in 1770. His son, also named Jacob Motte, married Rebecca Brewton, daughter of goldsmith Robert Brewton and sister of Miles Brewton, a wealthy slave trader.

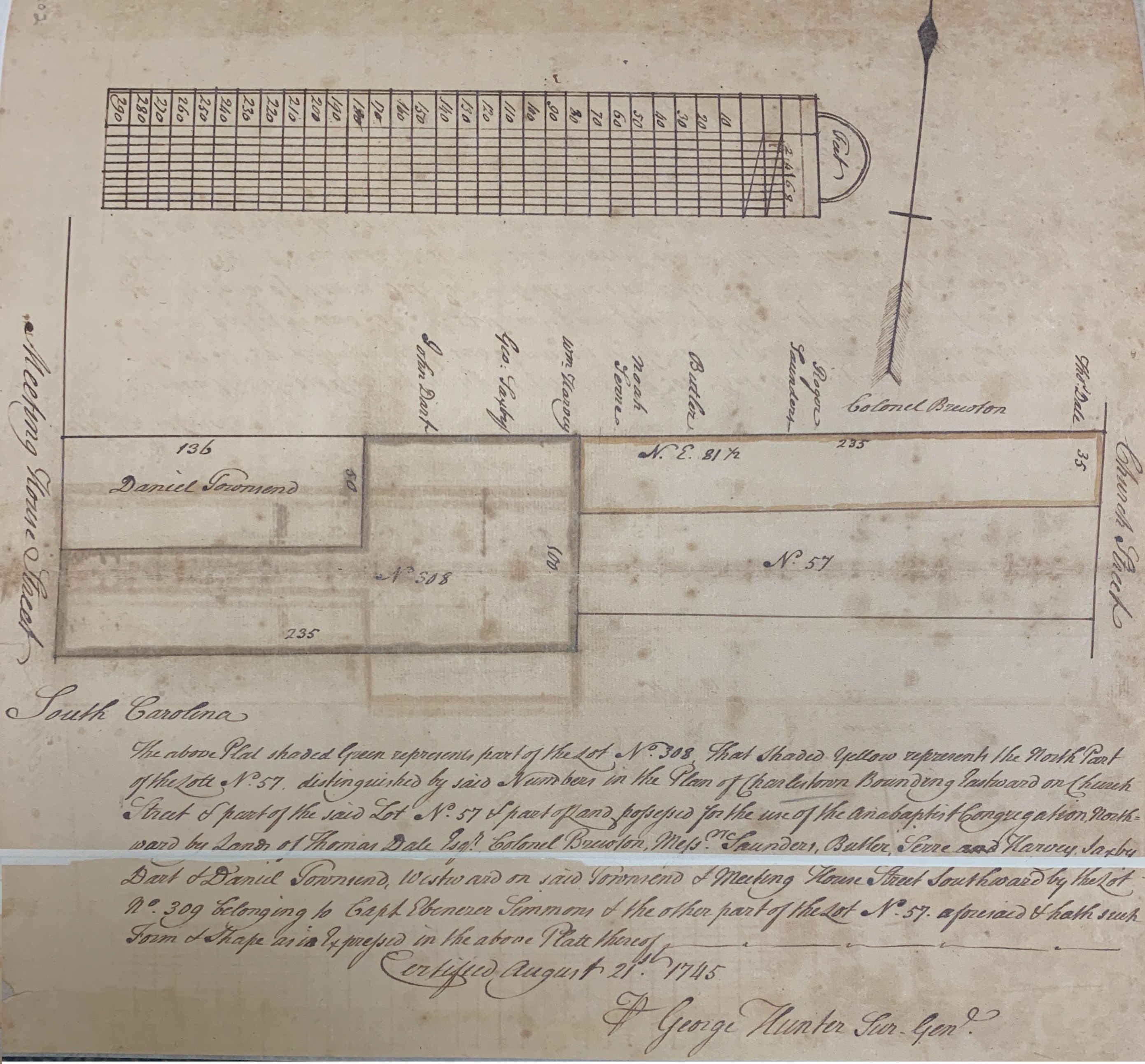
The house was built on the southern portion of Lot 57 of an earlier subdivision and was not specifically noted on a plat drawn in 1745.

In 1778, Colonel James Parsons occupied the house; he was a member of the Continental Congress and had been offered the vice-presidency of South Carolina before the formation of the United States. From 1800 to 1811, O'Brien Smith, a member of Congress, owned the house. At his death, he left the house to his widow. Later it was owned by his sister Honora Smith Pyne.

Mrs. William Mason Smith bought the house in 1869. Her granddaughter, American artist Alice Ravenel Huger Smith, lived in the house in the 20th century.

After the house was bought in 1969 by Anthony Cecil and his wife, they had it restored to its Georgian and Adam period appearance, with later changes removed.

The house follows a traditional double-house format with four principal rooms on each floor, and a centrally located stair hall. An unusual feature is that the third-floor windows are the same height as those on the first two floors; the expected design would have had smaller windows on the third floor.

It is still privately owned.

== See also ==
- Robert Brewton House
- Branford-Horry House
