= EC Bell =

American painter

EC Bell (born February 9, 1946) is an American expressionist painter and gallery owner from Charleston, South Carolina. In his career, he has completed work that ranges from abstract to representational and celebrates every facet of the female body.

Bell's favorite subject is the female body and land around his former home of Charleston, South Carolina, and those near his current home in the Mexican state of Guanajuato.

== Childhood and early career ==
The youngest of five children of Elwood Bell and Lily Benson, Elwood Cranmer Bell Jr. was born in Wilmington, North Carolina. He began painting at an early age and was commissioned for his first portrait at 11 years old. In 1966, at age 19, he enlisted in the Army. EC Bell attended the University of North Carolina and studied art under Claude Howell, Jack Berkman, and Roy Schmultz in Kaiserslautern where he was influenced by German Expressionism.

== Mature career ==
He has tended to gravitate to several identifiable landscapes to which he has returned repeatedly over a period of decades. He typically begins a painting with a sketch on canvas in pencil followed by a loose brushed wash before executing a finished painting with acrylic paint in washes, drybrush and numerous layers of color. His works have fetched increasingly higher prices with his growing fame, and today Bell's major works sell at an excess of ten thousand dollars from private dealers and at auction. Though the female nude is a classic subject, much of EC Bell's struggle as an artist has been combating narrow-minded attitudes towards erotic art. Bell's delicate approach to the female nude as well as his mastery of form has changed many minds.

He lives and works in the art mecca of San Miguel de Allende, Mexico.

== Curatorial projects ==
- Annual Erotic Art Invitational, Belle Muse Art Gallery, Spoleto Festival USA, Charleston, SC 2003–2006

== Collections ==
- Private Collections in the US, Canada, France, Poland, the Netherlands, Germany, Ireland, England, Venezuela, Columbia, Mexico & Puerto Rico.
