= Wedge Plantation =

Historic house in South Carolina, United States

- The Wedge
- U.S. National Register of Historic Places
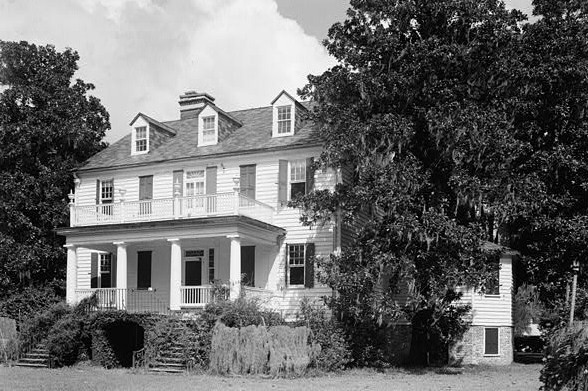
- Wedge Plantation in 1940

- Location within South Carolina Location within the United States
- Nearest city: McClellanville, South Carolina
- Coordinates: 33°10′17″N 79°23′57″W
- Built: ca. 1826
- Architectural style: Federal, Federal vernacular
- NRHP reference No.: 80003660
- Added to NRHP: November 25, 1980

The Wedge Plantation, which is also known as The Wedge or the William Lucas House, is a plantation about 5 mi (8 km) east of McClellanville in Charleston County, South Carolina. The plantation is a wedge-shaped property between the Harrietta Plantation and the Fairfield Plantation. The plantation house was built around 1830. It is located off US Highway 17 near the Santee River. It was named to the National Register of Historic Places on September 18, 1975.

== History ==
The house was built by a rice planter William Lucas around 1826. Lucas was a son of Jonathan Lucas, who invented a rice-pounding mill. It remained in the Lucas family for the next hundred years. It was a working rice plantation up to about 1914.

In 1929, Mr. and Mrs. Elbridge Chadwick acquired the plantation and restored the house with the assistance of architect Albert Simons. In 1948, Mr. and Mrs. Charles H. Woodward purchased it for a winter home.

Dr. Richard B. Dominick and Mrs. Tatiana Dominick owned the Wedge Plantation from 1966 to 1976. During the ten-years of his life there, Dominick collected over 25,000 moths and 1,000 butterflies on the plantation. The Richard B. Dominick Moth and Butterfly Collection resides at the University of South Carolina's McKissick Museum in Columbia, South Carolina. Richard Dominick established the Wedge Entomological Research Foundation for the publication of the Moths of North America North of Mexico. Richard Dominick died at The Wedge in May, 1976. His estate owned the property for another six years.

In the 1970s, The Wedge was purchased by the State of South Carolina for "about $1 million." It became the University of South Carolina's International Center for Public Health Research for the study of insect-borne diseases. This program was closed in 1995 when funding for it expired and was not renewed. The University then leased The Wedge until 2014 for hunting and other uses, including the 2009 Kevin Costner film The New Daughter .

Attempts to sell the plantation have failed. The university's board of trustees determined that the annual cost of maintaining the plantation at $385,000 in 2013, but the university allots only $100,000 yearly as of 2020. In 2014, the plantation was put up for sale at $4 million (~$5.21 million in 2024), but no offers were made. A subsequent attempt to find a buyer using a real estate agent also failed. An appraisal of the plantation's value included $500,000 in needed repairs. On July 3, 2020, the university opened the bidding process again with the minimum bid pegged at $3.2 million, with bids due by August 20, 2020.

== Architecture ==
The house was constructed around 1826. This is a Federal style, clapboard house on a raised basement. The basic shape of this 2 1/2-story house is rectangular. The house has a gable roof with dormers. The front horseshoe stairs to the porch are granite with an iron railing. A semicircular archway leads to the basement.

The portico is supported by four fluted Doric columns. The pediment has a semi-elliptical window. It is decorated with dentate molding. The second floor has French doors with a fanlight transom that open to the railed balcony on the portico.

The south facade has single nine over nine lights on either side of the doors. Each wing has four nine over nine lights. In the second story, there are pairs of six over six lights to the left and right of the porch gable. The front door has a fanlight transom. Dormer windows and basement windows are six over six lights. The gabled ends have three six over six lights. The east and west elevations have four nine over nine lights. The north elevation has two dormers. There are four windows on each floor and a window in the stairwell between the first and second floors. The rear portico has four Doric columns.

The interior has a four-room, central hall plan. The main floor has right and left parlors separated by the central hall. Behind are an alcove and library on the right and a kitchen and laundry on the left. The basement includes a wine cellar, storage room. The basement floor is brick. One room has a millstone incorporated in its floor.

== PBS New Home Show project ==
A PBS television show entitled, "The New Home Show" built a modern-day replica of the Wedge Plantation home near Matthews, North Carolina using modern day materials. The replica was designed by William Poole. The Wedge Plantation project was built over 18 episodes.

Additional photographs of the exterior of the house are available.
