= Robert Brewton House =

Historic house in South Carolina, United States

- U.S. National Register of Historic Places
- U.S. National Historic Landmark
- U.S. National Historic Landmark District – Contributing property
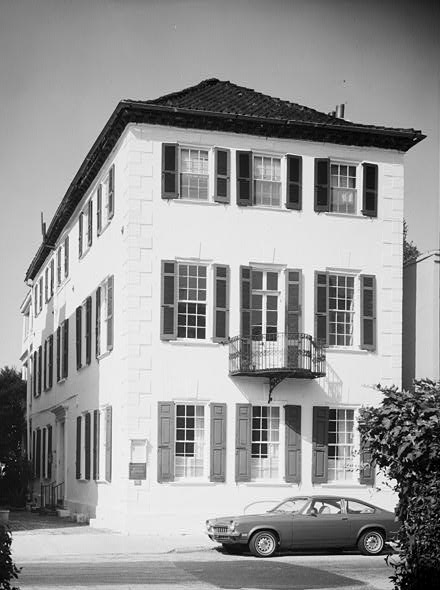
- 1983 photograph, Historic American Buildings Survey.

- Location within South Carolina Location within the United States
- Location: 71 Church Street, Charleston, South Carolina
- Coordinates: 32°46′28″N 79°55′46.2″W
- Built: 1721
- Part of: Charleston Historic District (ID66000964)
- NRHP reference No.: 66000700

Significant dates
- Added to NRHP: October 15, 1966
- Designated NHL: October 9, 1960
- Designated NHLDCP: October 9, 1960

The Robert Brewton House is a historic house at 71 Church Street in Charleston, South Carolina. With a construction date at or before 1730, it is the oldest dated example of a "single" house. A single house is one room wide, with the narrow end towards the street, the better to catch cool breezes. It was declared a National Historic Landmark in 1960.

== Description and history ==
The house is set on a narrow lot on the west side of Church Street in Old Charleston. The house was built between 1701 and 1715.

It was acquired in the 1730s or 1740s by Miles Brewton, who had immigrated from Barbados to Charleston in 1684, where he became a goldsmith and militia officer. He gave the house to his son, Robert Brewton, also a goldsmith and then married to his second wife, Mary Griffith. In addition, Miles Brewton made a 1733 deed of gift to his daughter, Dale, of the neighboring house at 73 Church Street; this deed also refers to his son's house. The two properties were separated by a 3-foot alley.

Robert Brewton succeeded his father as Powder Receiver for the city in 1745. That year, he sold this house to his sister Rebecca Brewton and her husband Jordan Roche.

The house is a three-story, rectangular brick structure with a hip roof, featuring three bays at the front. It has a narrow driveway to the south, where it presents five bays and its main entrance. It has stuccoed corner quoining, and decorative stuccoed keystone elements over the windows. The building is known to have had a porch across the main facade; it was not original to the building, and was removed at an unknown date.

Robert's son Miles Brewton (1731-1775) benefited by his father's financial connections. He gained some of his education in England in the 1750s, and returned to Charleston, where he became a merchant and slave trader in Charleston. He commissioned construction of the Miles Brewton House on King Street, which was completed about 1769. It is a double house in the Palladian style, with an intact complex of support buildings on its two-acre lot. Considered one of the finest Georgian buildings in the country, it was designated as a National Historic Landmark in 1979.

== See also ==
- List of National Historic Landmarks in South Carolina
- National Register of Historic Places listings in Charleston, South Carolina
- Miles Brewton House
- Capers-Motte House
- Branford-Horry House
