= O'Brien Smith =

American politician

Member of the U.S. House of Representatives from South Carolina's 4th district
- In office March 4, 1805 – March 3, 1807
- Preceded by: Wade Hampton I
- Succeeded by: John Taylor

Member of the South Carolina Senate from St. Bartholomew's Parish
- In office November 24, 1800 – November 23, 1804
- Preceded by: Paul Hamilton
- Succeeded by: William Cotesworth Pinckney

Member of the South Carolina House of Representatives from St. Bartholomew's Parish
- In office January 5, 1789 – December 21, 1799

Personal details
- Born: c. 1756 Kingdom of Ireland
- Died: April 27, 1811 (aged 54–55) South Carolina, U.S.
- Resting place: Colleton County, South Carolina
- Party: Democratic-Republican

O'Brien Smith (c. 1756 – April 27, 1811) was an Irish-American political figure who served in South Carolina's House and Senate in the first decade of the 19th century, as well as one term in the U.S. Congress representing South Carolina's 4th congressional district.

Born in the Kingdom of Ireland, Smith was in his late twenties when he emigrated to South Carolina in the months immediately following the end of the Revolutionary War. He took the oath of allegiance to the Government of the United States on July 31, 1784, and began to participate in his adopted country's political activities, serving as a member of South Carolina House of Representatives from 1789 to 1799 and in the South Carolina Senate in 1800. In 1804 he was elected as a Democratic-Republican Party to the Ninth Congress for the term lasting from (March 4, 1805 – March 3, 1807). During this time in his life, Smith lived at the Capers-Motte House in Charleston, South Carolina.

O'Brien Smith was in his mid-fifties when he died in South Carolina, nearly three decades after arriving in the United States. There is no known historical record indicating the date and place of his birth, although the year is generally estimated to be 1756 and the country of birth is presumed to be Ireland. He was interred in the burial ground of the colonial Chapel of Ease of St. Bartholomew's Parish, Colleton County, near Jacksonboro.

U.S. House of Representatives
Preceded by Wade Hampton I	Member of the U.S. House of Representatives from South Carolina's 4th congressional district 1805 - 1807	Succeeded by John Taylor
