= Samuel L. Duncan =

American politician

Samuel L. Duncan was a farmer, educator, and minister who served as a member of the South Carolina House of Representatives from 1872 until 1876 and in the South Carolina Senate from 1876 until 1880. A Republican, he represented Orangeburg. He opposed a bill to provide artificial legs to Confederate South Carolina veterans because it excluded U.S. Army veterans. He helped establish the Good Samaritan Lodge Hall's school for African Americans. He was from Fort Motte. He signed opposition to a delay of a State Senate investigation into the abuse of prisoners sent to work for railroads and other businesses.

Duncan was born in the 1810s and died shortly before the start of World War I.

He served in the South Carolina House of Representatives from 1872 to 1876 and in the South Carolina Senate from 1876 to 1880. He was commissioned as a Captain of Company H of the 3rd Brigade, 3rd Division of the National Guard on October 29, 1873. He chaired the South Carolina Republican Party from 1874 to 1882.

He was involved at Sandy Lawn Baptist Church and the Sandy Lawn School. He and Edward Israel Cain were honored with a South Carolina Senate resolution February 8, 2023.

== See also ==
- Fort Motte, South Carolina
