= Siege of Fort Motte =

Military Operation

- Part of the American Revolutionary War
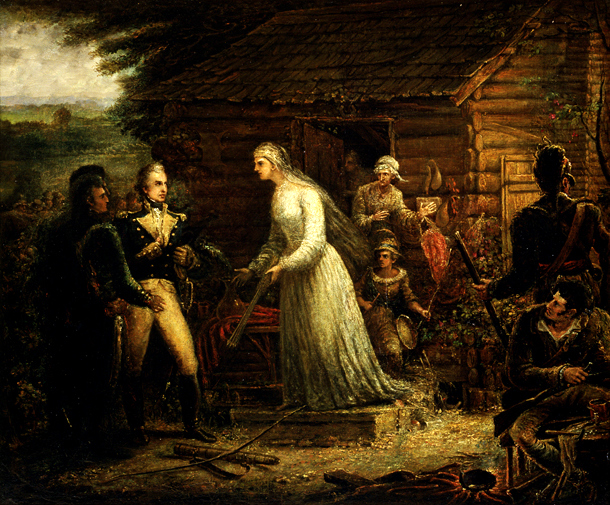
- Mrs. Motte Directing Generals Marion and Lee to Burn Her Mansion, by John Blake White (painted before 1859)
Date	May 8–12, 1781
Location	Fort Motte, South Carolina 33.76084°N 80.66965°W
Result	American victory

Belligerents
Great Britain	United States

Commanders and leaders
Daniel McPherson (surrendered)	Francis Marion Henry Lee

Strength
About 140	About 450

Casualties and losses
All captured	2 wounded

The siege of Fort Motte was a military operation during the American Revolutionary War. A force of Patriots led by General Francis "Swamp Fox" Marion and Lieutenant Colonel "Light Horse" Harry Lee set out to capture the British post at Fort Motte, the informal name of a plantation mansion fortified by the British for use as a depot because of its strategic location at the confluence of the Congaree and Wateree rivers. The British garrisoned roughly 175 soldiers under Lieutenant Daniel McPherson at the fort.

Marion and Lee learned that Lord Rawdon was retreating towards Fort Motte in the aftermath of the Battle of Hobkirk's Hill. The Americans forces invested the place on May 8 and wanted to capture the fort before Rawdon arrived. Two days later, Marion called for the British to surrender and McPherson refused. The next day, Colonel Lee informed Mrs. Motte that he intended to burn the mansion down to force the British out. On May 12, 1781, the American forces had entrenched themselves close enough to the mansion they were able to hit the roof with flaming arrows. Mrs Motte, a patriot, accepted Lee's plan, and offered her own arrows for it. The mansion was set on fire. Marion's artillery fire added to the desperation of the British and, by one o'clock that afternoon, McPherson surrendered the garrison to the Patriots.

== Background ==
Great Britain's "southern strategy" for winning the American Revolutionary War appeared in some ways to be going well after the Battle of Guilford Courthouse in March 1781. General Lord Cornwallis had defeated General Nathanael Greene, but his army was short on supplies and had suffered significant casualties, so he decided to move to Wilmington, North Carolina to resupply and refit his troops. Greene, while he had lost the battlefield, still had his army intact. After shadowing Cornwallis for a time, he turned south, and embarked on an expedition to recover Patriot control of South Carolina and Georgia, where British and Loyalist forces were thinly distributed, and smaller outposts were subject to attack from larger forces under the command of Greene or one of the Patriot militia commanders in the area.

He first ordered Colonel Henry "Light Horse Harry" Lee to continue shadowing Cornwallis so that his southward movement was screened. Once he was on his way into South Carolina, he ordered Lee to abandon Cornwallis and instead join forces with militia Colonel Francis Marion in the eastern part of the state. Lee and Marion met on April 14, and first targeted Fort Watson, a small stockaded fort on the east side of the Santee River, which fell after a short siege. They chased after John Watson, the fort's usual commander, who had led a force away from it in search of Marion, but was forced onto the defensive when Lee arrived.

Lee and Marion then targeted Fort Motte, a key British supply depot and communication point not far from the confluence of the Congaree and Wateree Rivers. The British had taken over Mount Joseph Plantation, owned by Miles Brewton and then occupied by his sister, the widowed Rebecca Brewton Motte and her children, who had left the city of Charleston. The British fortified the area around the mansion, building palisades, ramparts, trenches and abatis. They garrisoned a force of roughly 175, made up of British soldiers, Hessians, and Provincials under Lieutenant Daniel McPherson at the fort.

== Siege ==
Arriving May 8, Lee and Marion immediately surrounded the fort, which was dominated by the two-story Motte residence and garrisoned by about 140 British and Hessian regulars under McPherson. On the approach of the Americans, McPherson's troops had evicted Rebecca Motte from the main house, and she had taken up residence outside the fort at the overseer's house.

As the forces of Watson and Rawdon were still active and might come to relieve the siege, Marion and Lee needed to bring the siege rapidly to a conclusion. At Fort Watson they had constructed a tower from which the attackers could fire into the fort, but this idea was not workable under the conditions at Fort Motte. The idea was then put forward to set fire to the buildings within the defenses. Mrs. Motte, apparently sympathetic to the Patriot cause, provided the arrows that were used to ignite the roof of the house on May 12. When the defenders tried to go onto the roof to extinguish the flames, the attackers fired on them with their six-pound gun, driving them off. The garrison surrendered shortly after, and the Americans moved quickly to put out the fires before the whole house was engulfed.

== Aftermath ==
The captured garrison was released on parole to return to Charleston. Before they left, Mrs. Motte and the American and British officers shared a meal. General Marion proceeded to the port of Georgetown, where he found its British garrison had withdrawn, while Lee was ordered by General Greene to assist in recapturing Augusta, Georgia.

== Legacy ==
The battlefield listed was listed on National Register of Historic Places in 1972.

== See also ==
- American Revolutionary War § War in the South. Places ' Siege of Fort Motte ' in overall sequence and strategic context.
- The Francis Marion Papers, Volume II 1781. Published and distributed by South Carolina American Revolution Sestercentennial Commission, October 2025.
- The Papers of General Nathanael Greene, Volume VIII, 30 March - 10 July 1781. Dennis M. Conrad, Editor.
