= Fairfield Plantation (Charleston County, South Carolina) =

Historic house in South Carolina, United States

- U.S. National Register of Historic Places
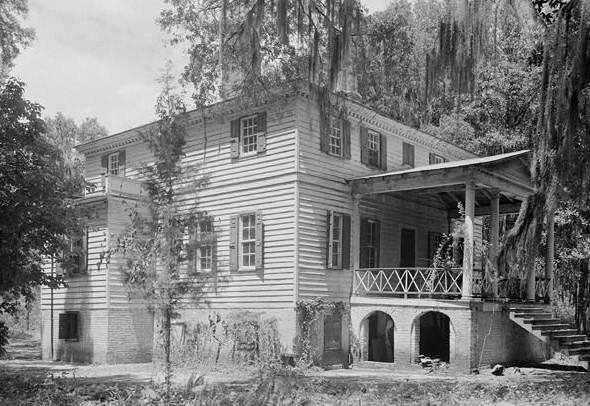
- River front entrance of Fairfield Plantation in 1940

- Location within South Carolina Location within the United States
- Nearest city: McClellanville, South Carolina
- Coordinates: 33°10′58″N 79°24′18″W
- Built: 1730
- Architectural style: Georgian
- NRHP reference No.: 74001838
- Added to NRHP: July 25, 1974

Fairfield Plantation, also known as the Lynch House is a plantation about 5 mi (8 km) east of McClellanville in Charleston County, South Carolina. It is adjacent to the Wedge Plantation and just north of Harrietta Plantation. The plantation house was built around 1730. It is located just off US Highway 17 near the Santee River. It was named to the National Register of Historic Places on September 18, 1975.

== History ==
The house at Fairfield Plantation is believed to have been built by the Lynch family around 1730. In 1758, Jacob Motte, son of Jacob Motte who was provincial treasurer, and his wife Rebecca Brewton Motte obtained the house. Their daughters, Elizabeth and Frances, both married Thomas Pinckney in succession and the house was left to Pinckney. Pinckney then left the house to his son, Thomas Pinckney Jr who in turn left it to his nephew, Captain Thomas Pinckney. The plantation has remained in the Pinckney family for over 200 years.

== Architecture ==
This is a Georgian style, clapboard house on a raised basement. It has central porches on the south and north elevations. Each is pedimented and supported by six Doric columns. Two columns are engaged. The south porch on the landside is supported by brick columns. The riverside north porch has brick arch supports. The porches were probably in the late 18th century. The house has a hip roof and two cross-shaped interior chimneys.

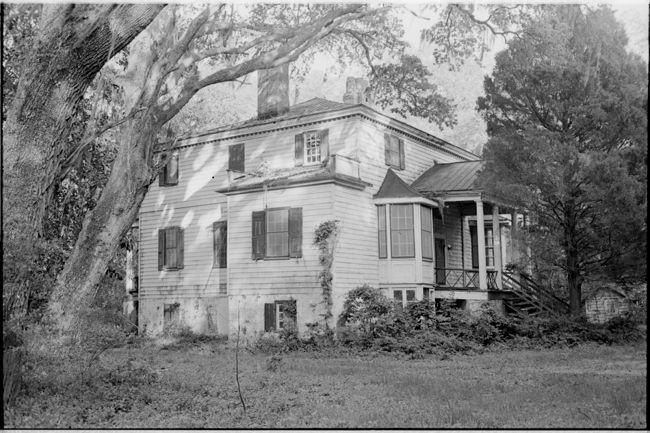
Land side entrance circa 1970.

The house originally had four rooms on the main floor and two rooms on the second floor. The latter rooms were facing the river. After Jacob Motte acquired the house, the second floor was squared out by adding two additional rooms. The main floor is taller than the second floor. There is a horizontal band on the exterior that separates the top floor from the main floor.

The south facade has a pair of nine over nine lights on each side of the door. The second floor has six over six lights above each of the first floor windows. In the second story, there are pairs of six over six lights to the left and right of the porch gable.

The east and west elevations each have three four over four lights on the first floor with shorter six over six lights above on the second floor. In the late 19th century bay windows were added, though they were subsequently removed toward the end of the 20th century. The second floor has a six over six light on each side of the porch roof just inside of the bay windows. There is small nine light window over the north door.

The first floor has four rooms. The larger of the front rooms has a central front entrance. The smaller room on the left is connected to the large room by a single door. The two rear rooms are the same size. They are divided by the central hall with a staircase. The front rooms have barrel-vaulted fireplaces with high mantels on their back walls. The left hand rear room has had small bathroom added at a later period. The floor plan of the basement is the same as the first floor. The upper floor has four rooms with small fireplaces.

Additional pictures are available.
