= Middleton-Pinckney House =

Historic house in South Carolina, United States

- U.S. Historic district – Contributing property
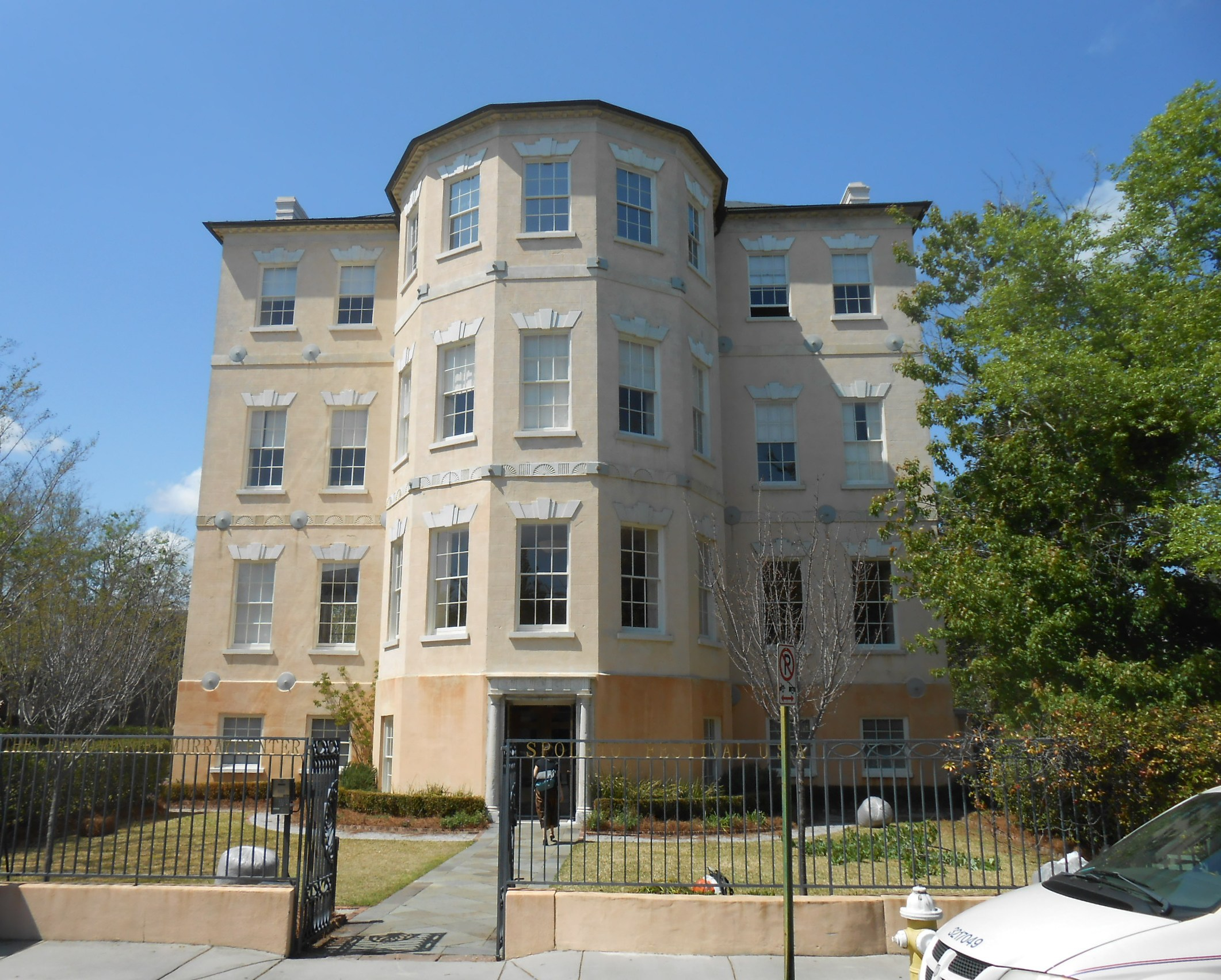
- Middleton-Motte-Pinckney House in 2013

- Location within South Carolina Location within the United States
- Location: 14 George Street; Charleston, South Carolina, 29401
- Coordinates: 32.7857°N 79.9326°W
- Built: 1796
- Architectural style: Neoclassical
- Part of: Charleston Historic District (ID66000964)
- Designated CP: October 9, 1960

The Middleton-Pinckney House is a historic three-story home built on a raised basement at 14 George Street, Charleston, South Carolina in the Ansonborough neighborhood. Frances Motte Middleton (a daughter of Jacob and Rebecca Brewton Motte and widow of John Middleton) began construction of the house in 1796 after purchasing a second lot adjacent to one bought by her father on George St. The house was completed by her and her second husband, Maj. Gen. Thomas Pinckney, whom she married in 1797.

The couple lived in the house at least from 1801 until, on February 26, 1825, the couple sold the house to Mrs. Pinckney's son, John Middleton, for $10,000. One exception occurred in 1816, when the family resided on Legare Street, perhaps to permit the reworking of the house in the then-popular Regency style. A real estate listing ran in the Charleston City Gazette in 1816 for the sale of the house which described an "unfinished Brick Building, intended for a dwelling house" along with a kitchen house and another brick dependency.

John Middleton died in 1826, and the house was sold to Mrs. Juliet Gibbes Elliott, at which time the house became known as the Elliott Mansion. The house remained a private residence until Jesse W. Starr Jr. bought it from Mrs. Elliott's estate in 1879 and resold it to the Water Works Company of Charleston in 1880. The water company was a private company until the City took over its operation in 1917.

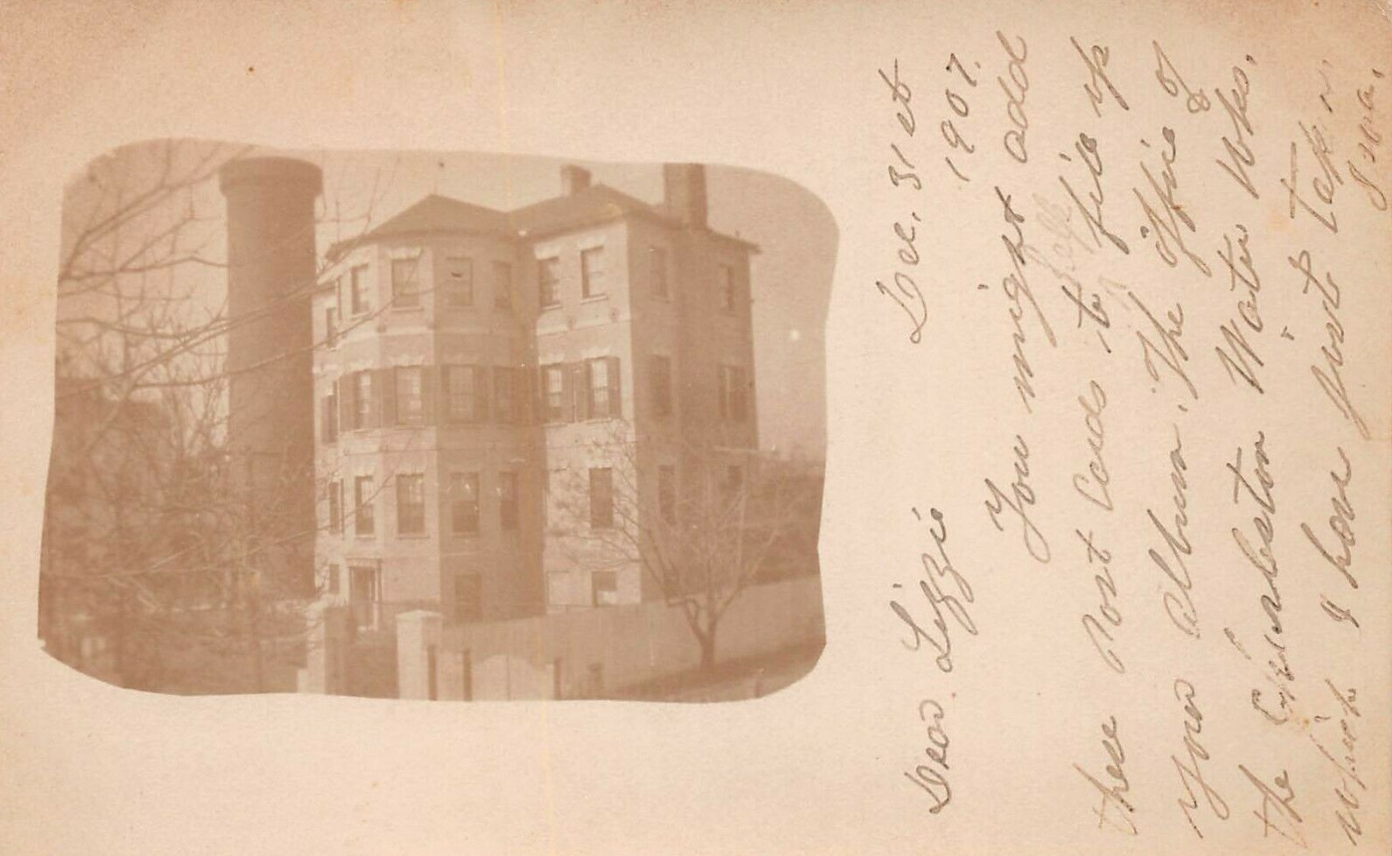
The house was used as the headquarters for the water company when this postcard was made in 1907 showing a 135,000 gallon water tower to the immediate west of the house.

In 1988, the house became the location of the headquarters of the Spoleto Festival USA. The City of Charleston donated the house to the festival in 2002, which undertook a rehabilitation of the property. The house is listed on the National Register of Historic Places as a contributing property to the Charleston Historic District.
