= Harrietta Plantation =

Historic house in South Carolina, United States

- U.S. National Register of Historic Places
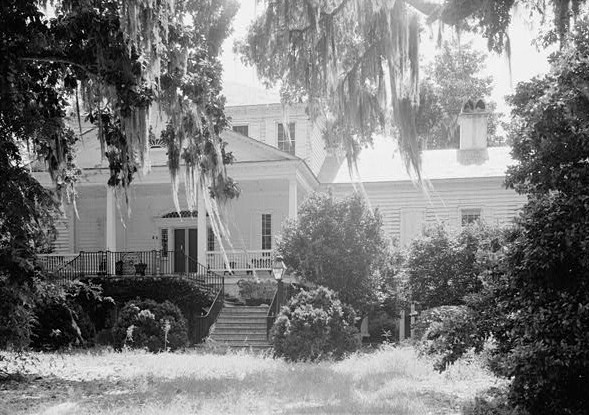
- North elevation of Harrietta Plantation in 1940

- Location within South Carolina Location within the United States
- Location: McClellanville, South Carolina
- Nearest city: McClellanville, South Carolina
- Coordinates: 33°10′10″N 79°23′36″W
- Built: ca. 1807
- Architectural style: Georgian
- NRHP reference No.: 75001695
- Added to NRHP: September 18, 1975

Harrieta Plantation is a plantation about 5 mi (8 km) east of McClellanville in Charleston County, South Carolina. It is located off US Highway 17 near the Santee River, adjacent to the Wedge Plantation and just south of Fairfield Plantation. The plantation house was built around 1807 and was named to the National Register of Historic Places on September 18, 1975.

== History ==
The house at Harrietta Plantation was built by Mrs. Harriot Horry of the Hampton Plantation for her daughter, Harriott and her husband Frederick Rutledge. Mrs. Horry's son, Charles Lucas Pinckney Horry, married Elenore Marie Florimonde de Fay la Tour Maubourg. When Charles and Elemore decided to live elsewhere, Frederick and Harriot Rutledge lived at Hampton Plantation, and work on the Harrietta Plantation House stopped.

In 1858, the house was purchased by Stephen D. Doar. He finished the upper floors and was the first resident in the house. The Doar family owned the house until 1929. Rice was cultivated until 1903. When the house was sold in 1929, there were rooms in the house that had yet to be plastered.

In 1929, Mr. Doar sold the plantation to Mr. Horatio Shonnard of New York, who undertook a restoration of the house and its gardens. In March 1947, the 17-room plantation and its 1500 acres were sold by Mrs. Horatio Shonnard to Mrs. John P. Abney, the widow of the founder of an eponymous chain of cotton mills in the Piedmont section of South Carolina. The plantation had been listed for sale for $115,000 at that time.

The house is currently owned by the Harrietta Holdings, LLC, a New Jersey limited liability company.

== Architecture ==
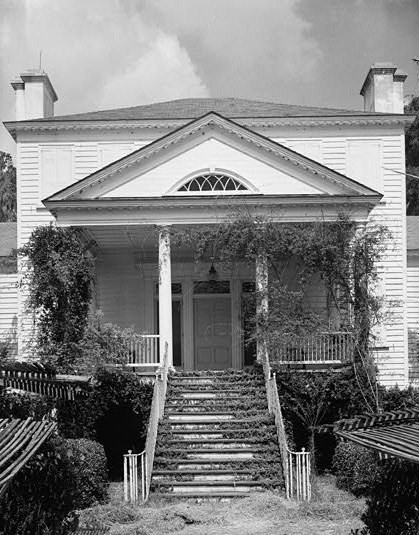
South elevation showing the "triple" door with the false door in the middle

The original house was constructed around 1807. This is a Georgian style, clapboard house on a raised basement. The first floor had two rooms with a rear hallway. Each of the rooms had a separate entrance door to the front porch. Because these doors were very close to each other, a false door was built between them. They were framed together to result in an architecturally pleasing facade. Both of these rooms have fireplaces with carved Federal mantels. The door frames and moldings are also in Federal style.

The south facade has a portico supported by four Doric columns. The pediment has a semi-elliptical window. It is decorated with dentate molding.

The south facade has single nine over nine lights on either side of the doors. Each wing has four nine over nine lights evenly spaced. In the second story, there are pairs of six over six lights to the left and right of the porch gable.

The single-story wings were built in the 1930s. The east wing has two rooms with a fireplace. The west wing has three rooms. Two of these have fireplaces. The wings use a Greek Revival style for the mantels and woodwork. The rear hallway extends along the north side of each wing.

A floor plan of the first floor with the wings has been published.

== Gardens ==
There is a formal garden on the south side that extends to Collins Creek. To the east, there are old rice fields. To the north is a lake with cypress trees that is an old rice field. To the west is the entrance to the plantation, which was the old slave avenue. There is also the remains of a rice threshing mill and one slave cabin.
