= Richard B. Dominick =

Richard Bayard Dominick
- Born: September 17, 1919; Jasper County, South Carolina, United States
- Died: May 4, 1976 (aged 56); McClellanville, South Carolina
- Resting place: Wedge Plantation
- Education: Yale University; Columbia University College of Physicians and Surgeons
- Occupation: Ophthalmologist
- Employer: Manhattan Eye, Ear and Throat Hospital
- Known for: Lepidoptery
- Spouse: Tatiana Djeneeff
- Awards: Air Medal, Purple Heart

Richard Bayard Dominick (September 17, 1919 - May 4, 1976) was an American ophthalmologist, outdoorsman, and amateur lepidopterist. He is best known for his extensive collection of moths and butterflies in South Carolina. He established the Wedge Entomology Research Foundation for the publication of a series of monographs entitled the Moths of America North of Mexico.

== Early life ==
He was born at the family plantation Gregorie Neck on the Coosawhatchie River in Jasper County, South Carolina. As a youth, he collected moths and butterflies in the area.

He attended Yale University as a member of Davenport College and was on the Yale college crew. He began to study premedical courses to become a physician.

In 1941, his life changed dramatically. The death of his father led to the sale of the family plantation. His early moth collection was donated to the American Museum of Natural History. He joined the Marine Corps as an aviator. During the war he flew a Douglas SBD Dauntless dive bomber in the Pacific. He was awarded the Air Medal and the Purple Heart.

After the war, he resumed his studies. He earned his medical degree at Columbia University. He did a surgical residency at Roosevelt Hospital and practiced at the Manhattan Eye, Ear and Throat Hospital.

Outside of his practice, he became an honorary life member of the Peabody Associates and the Explorers Club. He was a scoutmaster of a Boy Scout troop in Far Rockaway, New York for four years.

== Lepidoptery ==
On a visit to South Carolina, he rediscovered his boyhood interest in moths and butterflies. Looking at Alexander Barrett Klots' Field Guide to the Butterfly, he recognized specimens that he had collected as a youth.

He and his wife Tatiana purchased the Wedge Plantation near McClellanville, South Carolina. He dedicated himself to collecting and studying moths and butterflies. He built a laboratory with large "bug trap" for the collection of moths. He developed photographic techniques to record his specimens. He discovered new species including Dasychira dominickaria.

During this ten-year period, Dominick collected over 25,000 moths and 1,000 butterflies on the plantation. The Richard B. Dominick Moth and Butterfly Collection with over 1,100 species resides in the McKissick Museum at the University of South Carolina in Columbia, South Carolina.

Richard Dominick established the Wedge Entomological Research Foundation for the publication of a series of monographs entitled the Moths of North America North of Mexico.

He was a named a fellow of the Royal Entomological Society of London.
