= Branford-Horry House =

Historic house in South Carolina, United States

- U.S. National Register of Historic Places
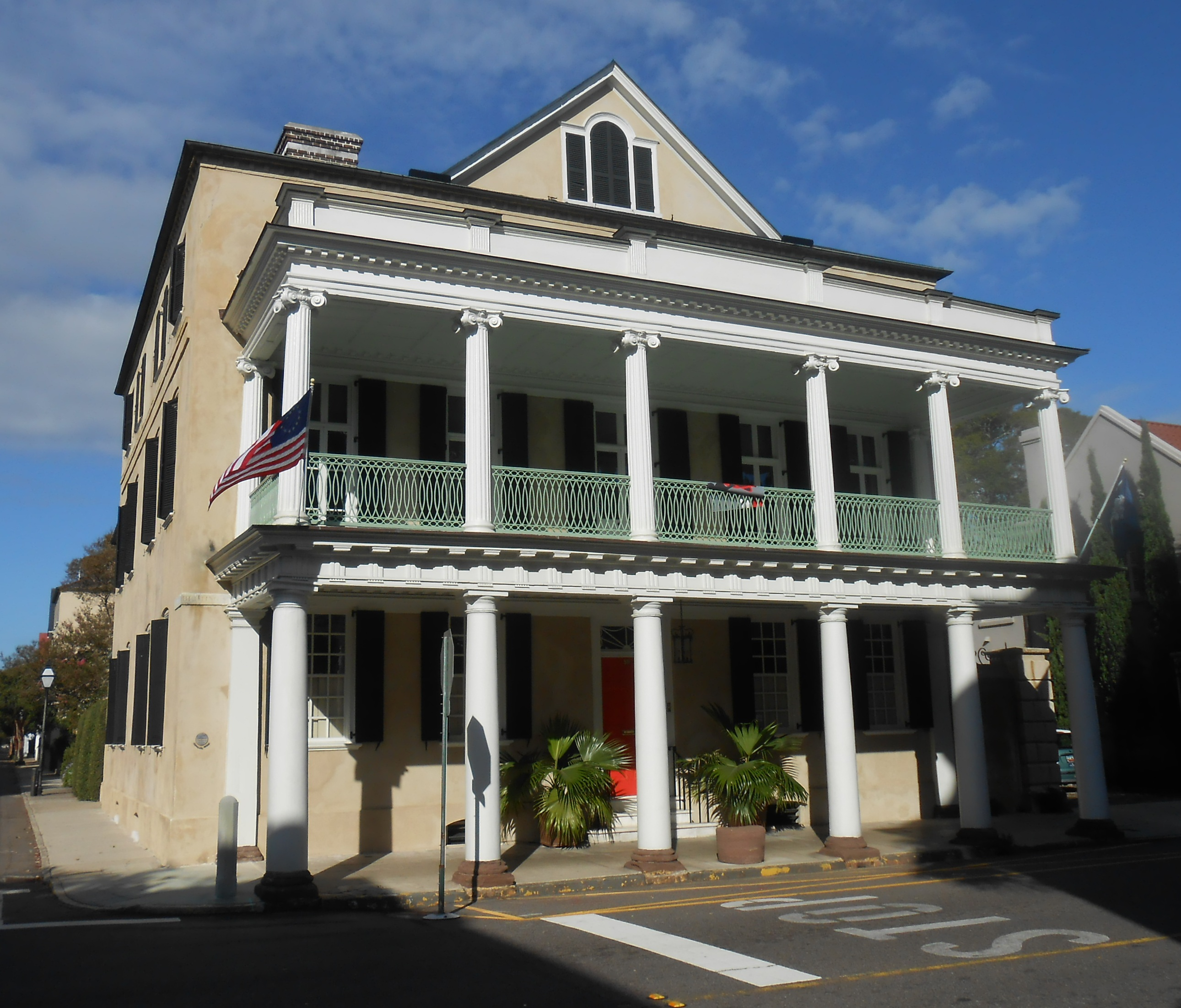

- Location within South Carolina Location within the United States
- Location: 59 Meeting St., Charleston, South Carolina
- Coordinates: 32°46′28″N 79°55′53″W
- Built: 1767
- Architectural style: Georgian
- NRHP reference No.: 70000573
- Added to NRHP: October 15, 1970

The Branford-Horry House is located at 59 Meeting Street, Charleston, South Carolina. The house is unusual for its piazza, which extends over the public sidewalk. The house holds both an exterior and interior historic preservation easement by the Preservation Society of Charleston.

== Description ==
The 6,216 square foot, three-story house of stuccoed brick has four bedrooms and five baths. Its features include interior cypress paneling, a carved mahogany mantelpiece, french doors, cornice details, and a carved wooden staircase. A cypress-paneled second-floor drawing room, carved by artisan Henry Burnett, is said to be "one of the most distinguished 18th-century rooms in America." A brick courtyard with fountain is located on the property. A two-story piazza extends over the sidewalk, with five columns supporting a pediment.

== History ==
The house was built after 1751, when William Branford married Elizabeth Savage, who had inherited the corner parcel from her uncle Benjamin Savage. Upon her death in 1801, the home was inherited by Ann Branford and her husband Thomas Horry. During the 1750s, the property included a carriage house and several outbuildings. According to the 1790 census, eight white people and thirty-four enslaved people lived in the complex.

The front piazza, built over the sidewalk, was added by Branford's grandson, Elias Horry, in about 1830. Horry served as mayor of Charleston from 1815-1817, during which time the house served as the mayoral mansion.

Preservationist Eliza D. Simons Kammerer owned the house from the 1940s to the 1960s, conducting an extensive restoration of the interior. She brought national attention to the home. The house was showcased in a National Geographic article in 1939.

The house was named to the National Register of Historic Places in 1970.

In 1988, a speeding car crashed into the house, knocking out two of the columns and sending one into the front door of the house.

Author Edward Ball stayed at the Branford-Horry House while researching his 1998 book Slaves in the Family. In the book, he describes the mansion as "run-down and neglected" after its owners had defaulted on a mortgage. He refers to the rooms as "moldering, the air thick and bacterial" with "peeling paint and water-stained plaster" and "beige stucco that was cracked and chipping."

The house was extensively rehabilitated in 2001-2002 "in a historically accurate manner, except modernizing kitchen and bathrooms." Interior and exterior historic preservation easements were granted in 2002 and 2004. In 2018, the home, in "exquisitely preserved" condition, sold for $6.2 million.

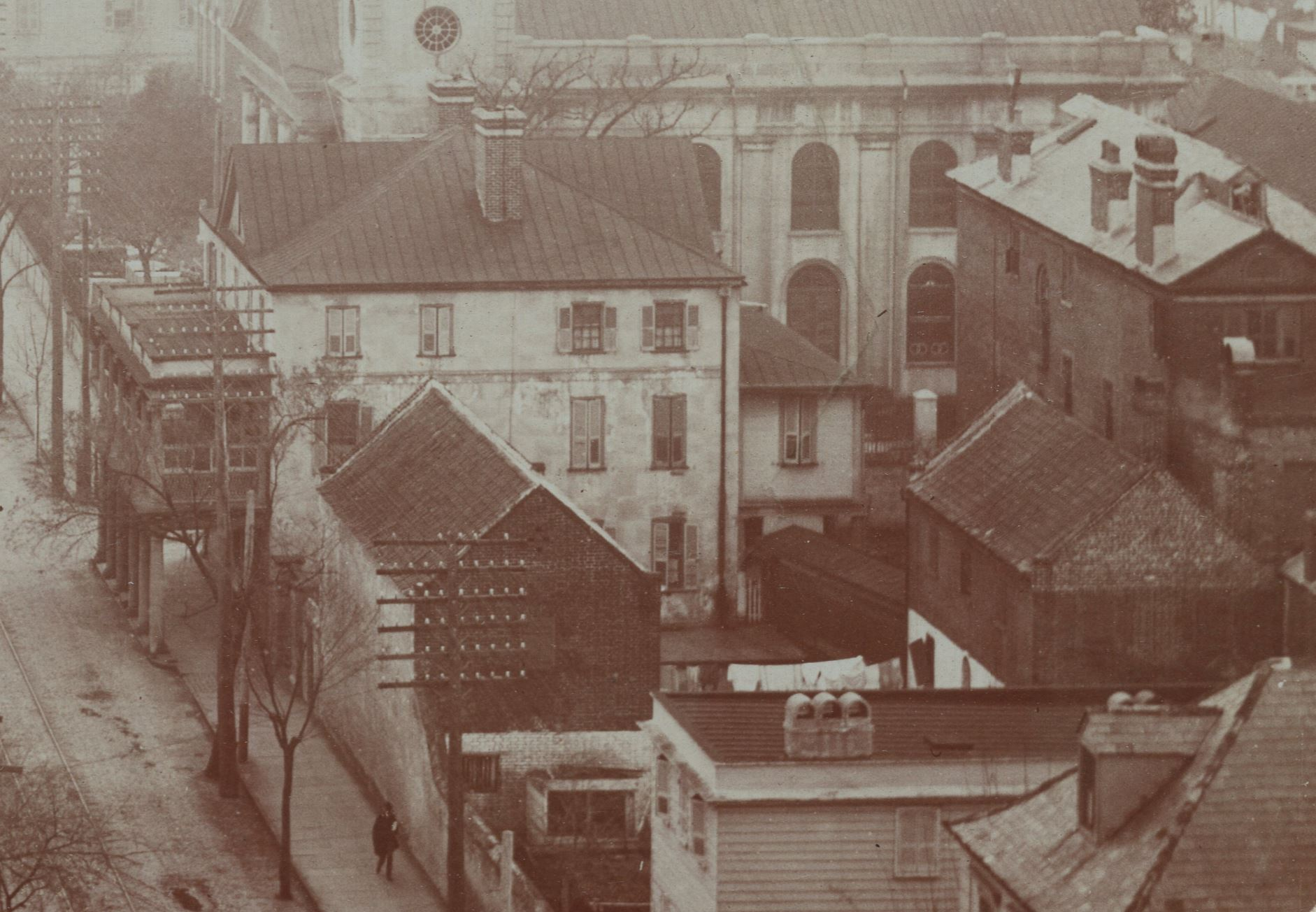
In about 1900, the two dependencies in the side yard to the north (closer to the photographer) could still be seen.

Today (Nov. 2025), it remains privately owned.

== See also ==
- Capers-Motte House
- Miles Brewton House
- Robert Brewton House
