= Rebecca Brewton Motte =

American colonist

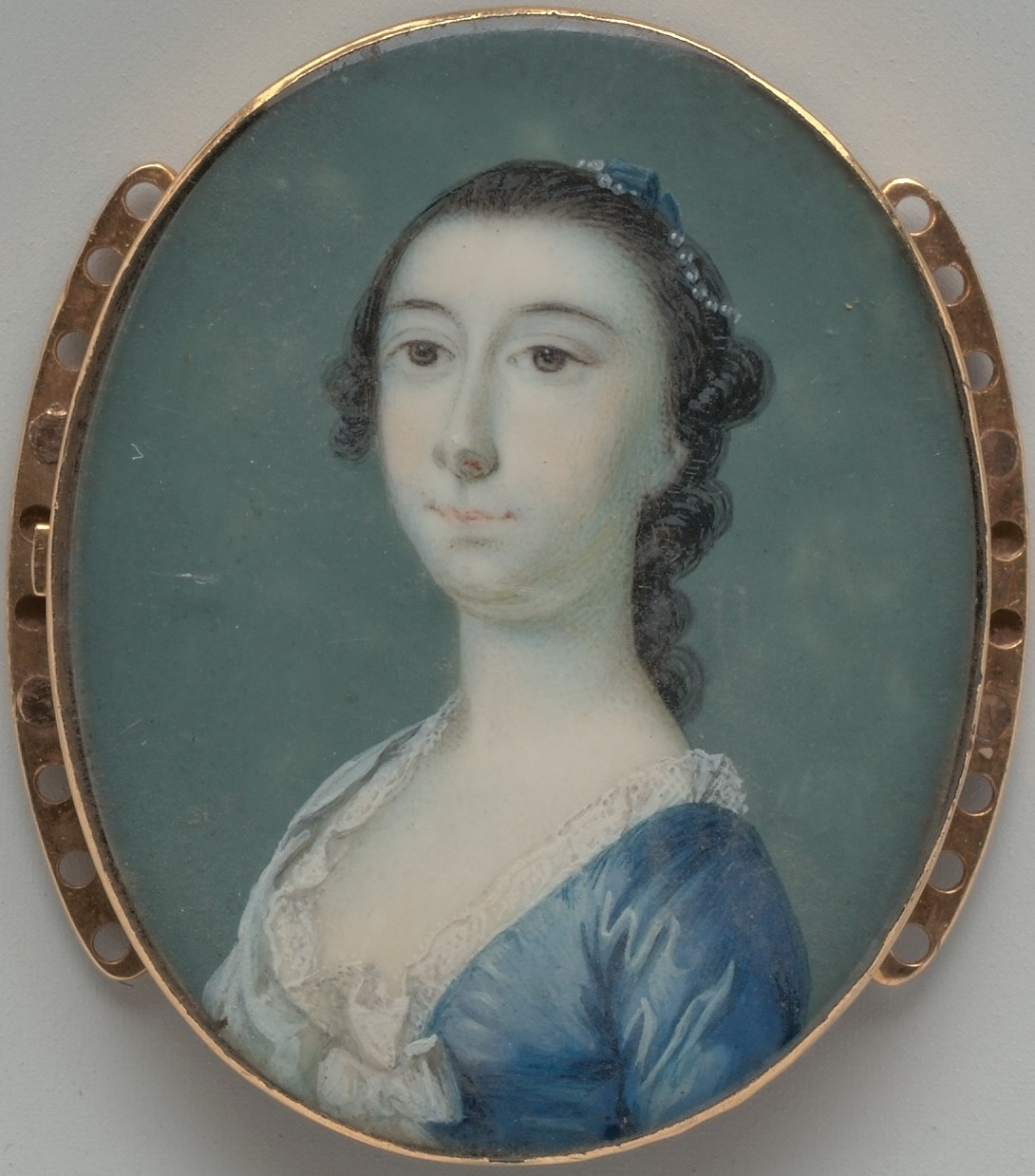
- Born: 1737
- Died: 1815 (aged 77–78)

Rebecca Brewton Motte (1737–1815) was a plantation owner in South Carolina and townhouse owner in its chief city of Charleston. She was known as a patriot in the American Revolution, supplying continental forces with food and supplies for five years. By the end of the war, she had become one of the wealthiest individuals in the state, having inherited property from both her older brother Miles Brewton, who was lost at sea in 1775, and her husband Jacob Motte, who died in 1780.

After the British took over Charleston in 1780, Motte went to live with her family at the Mt. Joseph plantation about 95 miles away, along the Congaree River. It became known as Fort Motte after the British occupied and fortified it; she moved with her family from the big house to the overseer's house. To help patriots take over the property, she agreed to have the big house burned down.

== Early life and marriage ==
Rebecca was the daughter of Robert Brewton, a successful goldsmith in Charleston, South Carolina, and his wife, the widow Mary Loughton, née Griffith. In this period, goldsmiths were closely tied to banking and the financial community. Among her siblings was older brother Miles (1731–1775), who married Mary Izard, the daughter of planters, and became a wealthy slave trader, owning eight ships; and sister Frances (b. 1733), who married Charles Pinckney.

At the age of 19, Rebecca married Jacob Motte (1729–1780) in 1758. Also born in Charleston, Jacob was a townsman and planter, involved in politics.

By 1758, Motte already owned a townhouse in Charleston and Fairfield Plantation (Charleston County, South Carolina) on the South Santee River outside the city. Their family thrived having seven children. Two died when young; infant mortality was high in that era. They also reared Susanna Smith Elliott, who had been orphaned when both her parents died.

In 1779, their daughter Elizabeth "Betsey" Motte (1762–1795) married Thomas Pinckney, an attorney and planter. He served in the Revolutionary War. After she died, he married again in 1797, to her younger sister Frances, who had by then become widowed herself. Pinckney served also in the War of 1812, and became a prominent politician in South Carolina. He was elected as governor. Frances and Thomas built what is now known as the Middleton-Pinckney House in Charleston, noted as a historic home and listed on the National Register of Historic Places.

== Revolutionary War era ==
Rebecca's older brother, Miles Brewton (1731–1789), gained property through a good marriage, and later owned up to eight ships after becoming South Carolina's largest slave trader and one of the wealthiest men in the province. In 1765, he had started construction of his lavish townhouse in King Street in Charleston. It is preserved as the Miles Brewton House. By the time of the Revolutionary War, he also owned numerous plantations (growing rice and indigo), including Mt. Joseph, in what is today Calhoun County. He and his family died in 1775, lost at sea as they were traveling to Philadelphia, where he was to serve as a delegate at the Second Continental Congress. Rebecca Brewton Motte and her sister Frances inherited his townhouse and plantations.

Jacob Motte was among the men who fought in the Battle of Fort Moultrie. On June 13, 1776, the women of Charleston presented the second regiment of the Continental Army with "a pair of silken colors, one of blue, one of red, richly embroidered by their own hands..." Susanna Smith Elliott presented the flags to officers Moultrie and Motte, saying,

"Your gallant behavior in defense of liberty and your country entitles you to the highest honors; accept these two standards as a reward justly due to your regiment; and I make not the least doubt, under heaven's protection, you will stand by them as long as they can wave in the air of liberty."

The Motte family supported the American Revolution and supplied troops with rice, beef, pork, corn, and fodder from 1778 to 1783. During the war, Rebecca Motte and her children were living for a period at the Charleston town house she inherited from her late brother Miles. It was commandeered in 1780 as British headquarters Her house was named as the headquarters for British Lieutenant Colonels Banastre Tarleton and Nisbet Balfour, and housing for Henry, one of the high-ranking officers of the British Army after they occupied the city.

Rebecca Motte took her family out of Charleston to the comparative safety of her late brother's Mt. Joseph plantation on the Congaree River, about 95 miles from the city. Her husband Jacob died of illness that year in 1780. Motte inherited the townhouse in Charleston, as well as Fairfield plantation and their 244 slaves.

In June 1780, the British had occupied Belleville Plantation along the Congaree. Although the nearby Mt. Joseph plantation had a more commanding view of the river, the British avoided it because of a suspected smallpox outbreak at the property.

By December 1780, Rebecca and her daughters, including Elizabeth Motte Pinckney (wife of Thomas Pinckney) with her infant, domestic slaves, and others had settled at Mt. Joseph. The British allowed Thomas Pinckney on parole to recuperate there, as he had been wounded and taken prisoner in August fighting at the Battle of Camden with General Gates.

In January 1781, Thomas Pinckney left for Charleston, then Philadelphia, along with other captured and paroled patriot officers, where they were to await possible exchange by the British. His wife and infant accompanied him. Shortly after, the British left Belleville and encamped at the Mt. Joseph plantation, where they began to fortify the big house and surrounds. Because Rebecca Motte was living there, they referred to the property as Fort Motte. Motte and her remaining family and household slaves moved to the overseer's house.

In May 1781, patriots Brigadier General Francis "Swamp Fox" Marion and Lt. Col. Henry Lee III of Virginia were sent by General Nathanael Greene to capture Fort Motte. In what became known as the Siege of Fort Motte, they arrived with about 400 men and an artillery piece. After five days of attack without dislodging the 125 defenders under Lt. Daniel MacPherson, Marion and Lee decided to burn the mansion, which had a dry wood shingle roof. Rebecca Motte ordered to "burn her home" and provided the patriot forces with some arrows from East India that were designed to light on impact. The mansion burned down, forcing MacPherson's troops to surrender.

== Later life ==
The widow Rebecca Brewton Motte had inherited considerable property from her late brother and husband. She was considered one of (if not the) wealthiest individuals in South Carolina in the Revolutionary War era. In the 1790s Motte had to pay off her family's war debts.

She and son-in-law Thomas Pinckney developed the rice plantation, Eldorado on the South Santee River, downstream from "Fairfield." There Brewton Motte lived with her daughter Frances and her family for the rest of her life. Some of her grandchildren remembered that she hung an old arrow quiver from the back of her chair to hold her knitting needles. The quiver represented Motte's contributions during the Revolutionary War, including helping to life the siege of Fort Motte.
