= Edward I. Cain =

American politician

Edward Israel Cain

South Carolina House of Representatives
- In office 1868–1870

Personal details
- Born: c. 1840 Fort Mott area of Orangeburg County
- Died: January 13, 1892 (aged 51–52) Fort Motte area of Calhoun County
- Party: Republican
- Spouse: Minty
- Children: 1

Edward Israel Cain (1837 - January 13, 1892) served in the South Carolina House of Representatives during the Reconstruction era. He represented Orangeburg. Enslaved from birth he escaped during the American Civil War and served in the Union Army. He served as school commissioner and Sheriff of Orangeburg. He is buried in the Fort Motte area He had a son James L. Cain. James L. was a revered principal and educator who has an elementary school named for him.

Edward Israel Cain was an Orderly Sergeant in Company H of the 135th United States Colored Troops during Civil War. He served in the South Carolina House of Representative representing Orangeburg's Fort Motte District during the Reconstruction era from 1868 to 1870 and was a member of the 1868 South Carolina Constitutional Convention. He was Orangeburg County's sheriff from 1872 to 1875 and served as Orangeburg District commissioner of education in 1871. He is buried in Fort Motte.

He and Samuel L. Duncan were honored in a South Carolina Senate resolution in February 8, 2023.
