= Josephine Pinckney =

American poet (1895–1957)

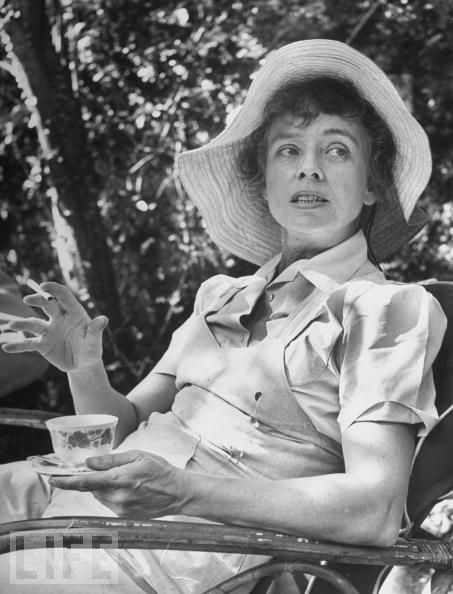
Josephine Pinckney in an un-dated picture.

Josephine Lyons Scott Pinckney (January 25, 1895 – October 4, 1957) was a novelist and poet in the literary revival of the American South after World War I. Her first best-selling novel was the social comedy Three O'clock Dinner (1945).

== Early life ==
Josephine Pinckney was born in Charleston, South Carolina on January 25, 1895 to Thomas Pinkney and Camilla Scott. She attended Ashley Hall and established a literary magazine there, graduating in 1912. She then attended college at the College of Charleston, Radcliffe College, and Columbia University, and held an honorary degree from the College of Charleston, given 1935. She received the Southern Authors Award in 1946.

== Writing career ==
As a poet, novelist, and essayist, Pinckney was an active participant in the Charleston Renaissance. In 1920, she co-founded the Poetry Society of South Carolina. She was involved in institutions such as the Charleston Museum and Dock Street Theatre, and was an early proponent of the historic preservation of Charleston. She was an active member of the Society for the Preservation of Spirituals, which transcribed and annotated African American songs. Both organizations met for the first time at Pinckney's home at 21 King St. in Charleston.

She died October 4, 1957, and is buried in Magnolia Cemetery.

Autobiographical snippet from the dust cover of Three O'clock Dinner:

Josephine Pinckney may be described as a cosmopolitan Charlestonian. She has traveled widely abroad, spent a year in Italy, lived winters in New York and summers in Mexico, but she always goes back to home and garden in Charleston, just as her family, well known in the south, has for generations. A literary lady, she has previously published a book of poems, "Sea Drinking Cities" and a novel, Hilton Head. With DuBose Heyward, Hervey Allen and others, she started the Poetry Society of South Carolina, which has had a strong influence on the rebirth of literature in the South. As a hobby, Miss Pinckney collects and transcribes spirituals which she sings with a group called the Society for the Preservation of Spirituals. Gardening and dogs have a strong appeal for her, and she collects old china and first editions.

== Works ==
=== Short stories (published in the Virginia Quarterly Review) ===
- "They Shall Return As Strangers" (1934)
- "The Merchant of London and the Treacherous Don" (1936)

=== Essay ===
- "Bulwarks Against Change" (1934)

=== Novels ===
- Hilton Head (1941)
- Three O'clock Dinner (1945)
- Great Mischief (1948)
- My Son and Foe (1952)
- Splendid in Ashes (1958)

=== Poetry ===
- "Sea Drinking Cities"
- "The Outcast"
- "Swamp Lilies"
