= Miles Brewton House =

Historic house in South Carolina, United States

- U.S. National Register of Historic Places
- U.S. National Historic Landmark
- U.S. National Historic Landmark District – Contributing property
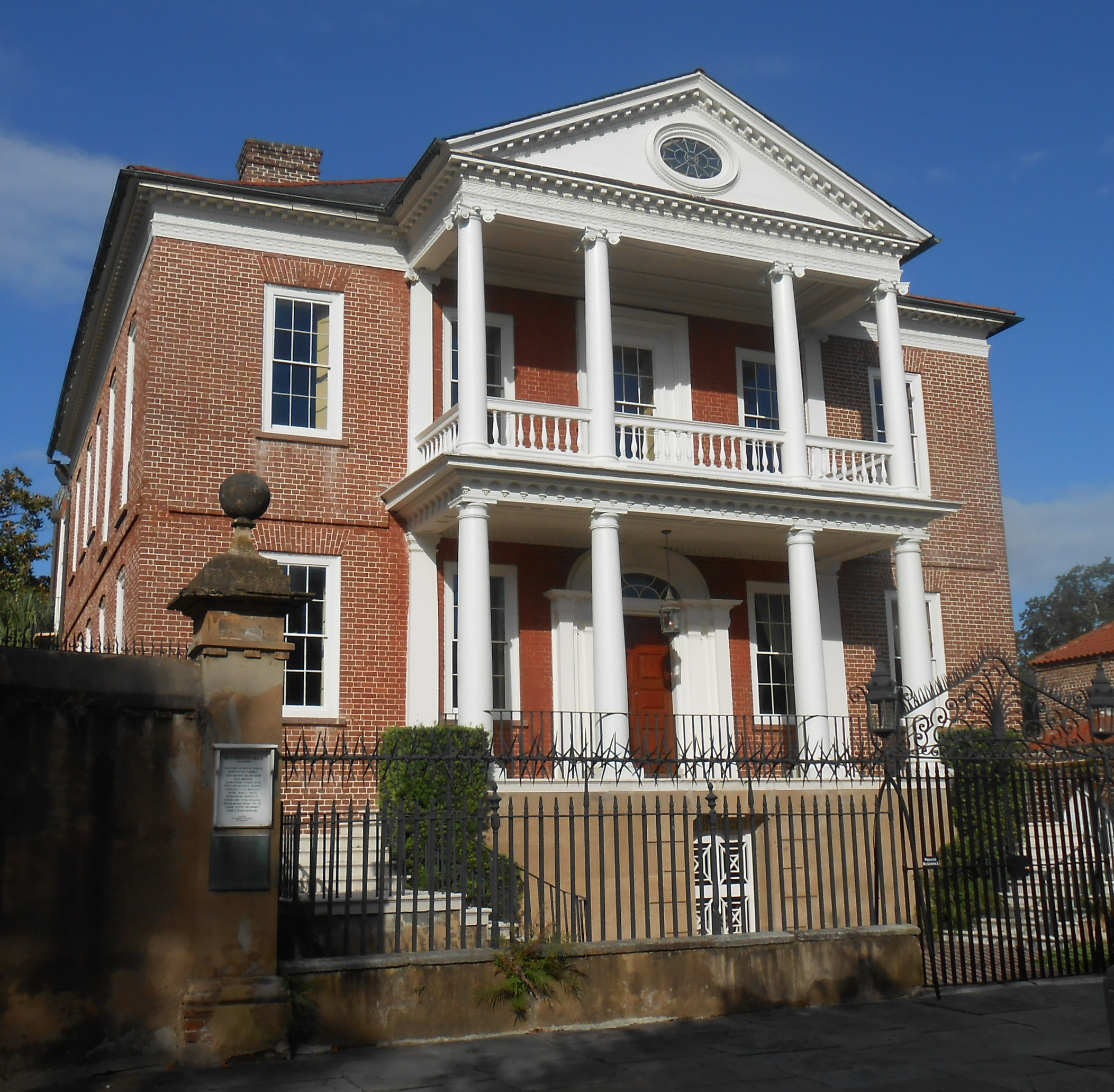
- Miles Brewton House

- Location within South Carolina Location within the United States
- Location: 27 King St., Charleston, South Carolina
- Coordinates: 32°46′21″N 79°55′59″W
- Area: 2 acres (0.81 ha)
- Built: 1765; 261 years ago
- Architectural style: Georgian
- Part of: Charleston Historic District (ID66000964)
- NRHP reference No.: 66000699

Significant dates
- Added to NRHP: October 15, 1966
- Designated NHL: October 9, 1960
- Designated NHLDCP: October 9, 1960

The Miles Brewton House is a National Historic Landmark residential complex located in Charleston, South Carolina. It is one of the finest examples of a double house (a reference to the arrangement of four main rooms per floor, separated by a central stair hall) in Charleston, designed on principles articulated by Andrea Palladio. Located on two acres, its extensive collection of dependencies makes it one of the most complete Georgian townhouse complexes in America. The house was built c. 1765–1769 for Miles Brewton, a wealthy slave trader and planter.

== Design ==
The architect Ezra Waite started construction of this "double house" in 1765 for Miles Brewton and completed it in 1769. Noted for its architectural quality and significance, the well-preserved house was declared a National Historic Landmark in 1960.

The Miles Brewton House is set on the west side of King Street near the southern tip of the Charleston peninsula. The 2-acre (0.81 ha) property is ringed by walls topped with iron fencing. The wall is lower at the front, with an iron gate leading into a courtyard area flanked by brick walls on the north and south, and on the west by the main house. The house is a two-story brick structure, set on a high stone basement, with marble steps flanking a projecting Classical two-story porch on either side. The porch is supported by columns (Doric on the first floor, Ionic on the second), and is topped by a fully pedimented and dentillated gable. The interior is richly finished in wood, plaster, and marble. The entrance to the house includes one of the few remaining chevaux de frise, or defensive spikes that were used to keep out intruders, and commonplace amidst concerns of slave revolt.

On the north side of the house is what is referred to locally as a "plantation lane", along which the property's outbuildings are located. These include period slave quarters, a kitchen, and a pavilion, all joined by an arcade. The large garden space directly behind the house retains its basic 18th-century layout.

== History ==
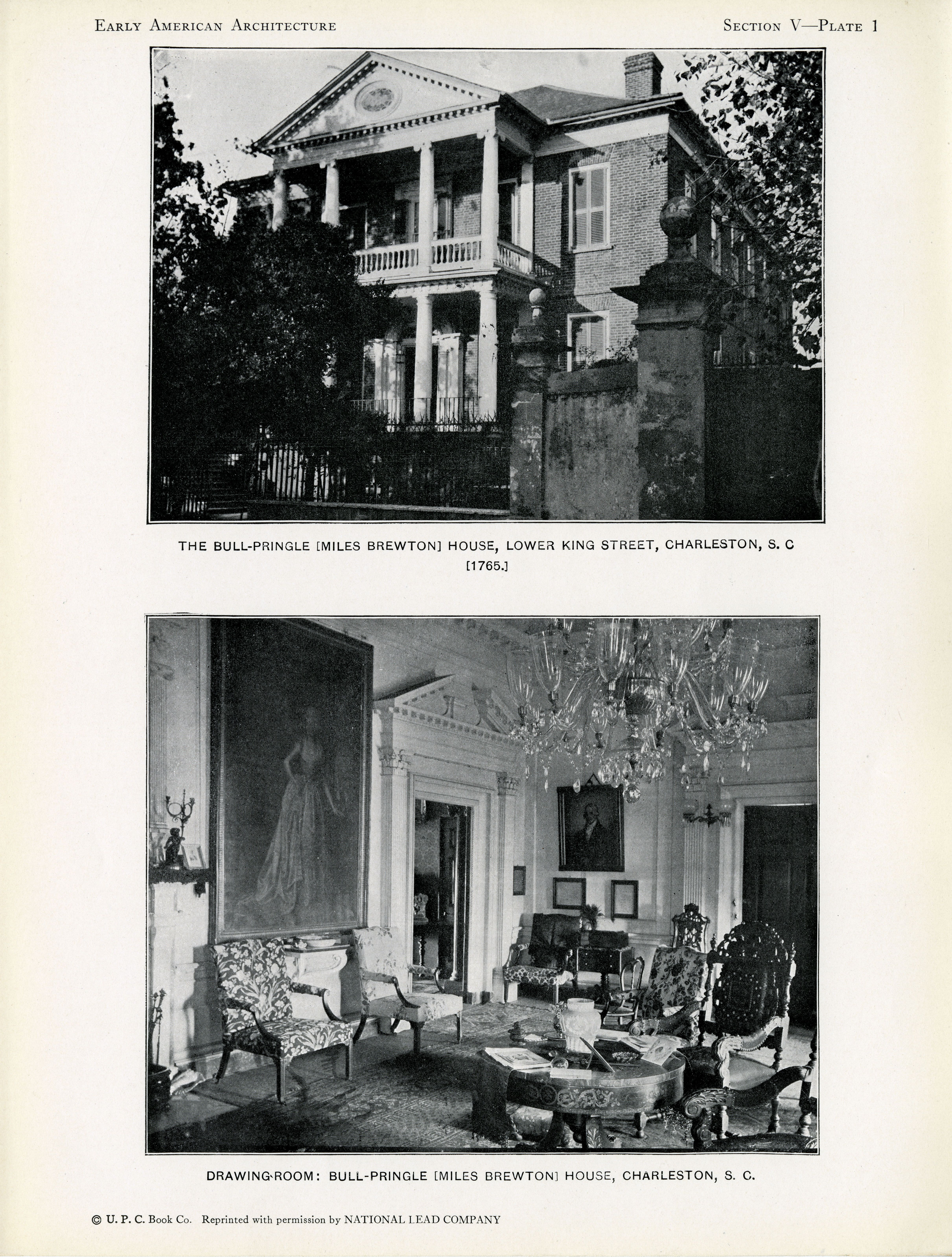
The Bull-Pringle [ Miles Brewton] House, Lower King Street, Charleston, South Carolina [1765] outside and the drawing room (Early American architecture — National Lead Company)

=== Miles Brewton ===
Miles Brewton (1731-1775) was an elder child of parents who were well-established in Charleston. His father was a goldsmith, and associated with the city's banking and financial circles in that period. Brewton married Mary Izard, daughter of a wealthy planter family, and acquired some property through her. He became a successful slave trader and merchant, becoming one of the wealthiest men in the province. He soon owned eight trading ships, and more than one plantation. In 1765 he commissioned design and construction of a fine Georgian house in the Palladian style in Charleston; it was completed in 1765. Elected as a delegate to the Second Continental Congress, he was traveling to Philadelphia with his family in late August 1775 when their ship went down and they were all lost at sea.

=== From the Revolutionary War to the present day ===
The house was inherited by his sisters Frances (Mrs. Charles Pinckney) and Rebecca (Mrs. Jacob Motte). In 1780, after the British occupied Charleston during the American Revolutionary War, they took over the Brewton house to use as the British headquarters for Henry Clinton.

One of Motte's daughters married Capt. William Alston of Marion's Brigade. He bought this Charleston house for his town residence, as an alternative to his plantation on the Waccamaw River. Their daughter, Mrs. William Bull Pringle, inherited the house. Since then, the house has been referred to as the Pringle House on King Street.

Motte was living in the townhouse when the British took it over for Henry Clinton in 1780 during the War of Independence. Clinton's profile is still visible where it was scratched on a marble mantelpiece. Motte moved with her daughters and domestic slaves to Mt. Joseph plantation, which she had also inherited from her brother Miles, about 95 miles outside the city on the Congaree River.

The house was taken for use as Union headquarters in 1865 during the federal occupation of Charleston in the Civil War. It was used as the headquarters of US Brigadier General Alexander Schimmelfennig during this period.

As of 1979, the house was still owned by a descendant of the Brewton-Motte family.

== See also ==
- List of National Historic Landmarks in South Carolina
- National Register of Historic Places listings in Charleston, South Carolina
- Branford-Horry House
- Robert Brewton House
- Capers-Motte House
- Colonel John Stuart House
