= Spoleto Festival USA =

Performing arts festival in Charleston, South Carolina

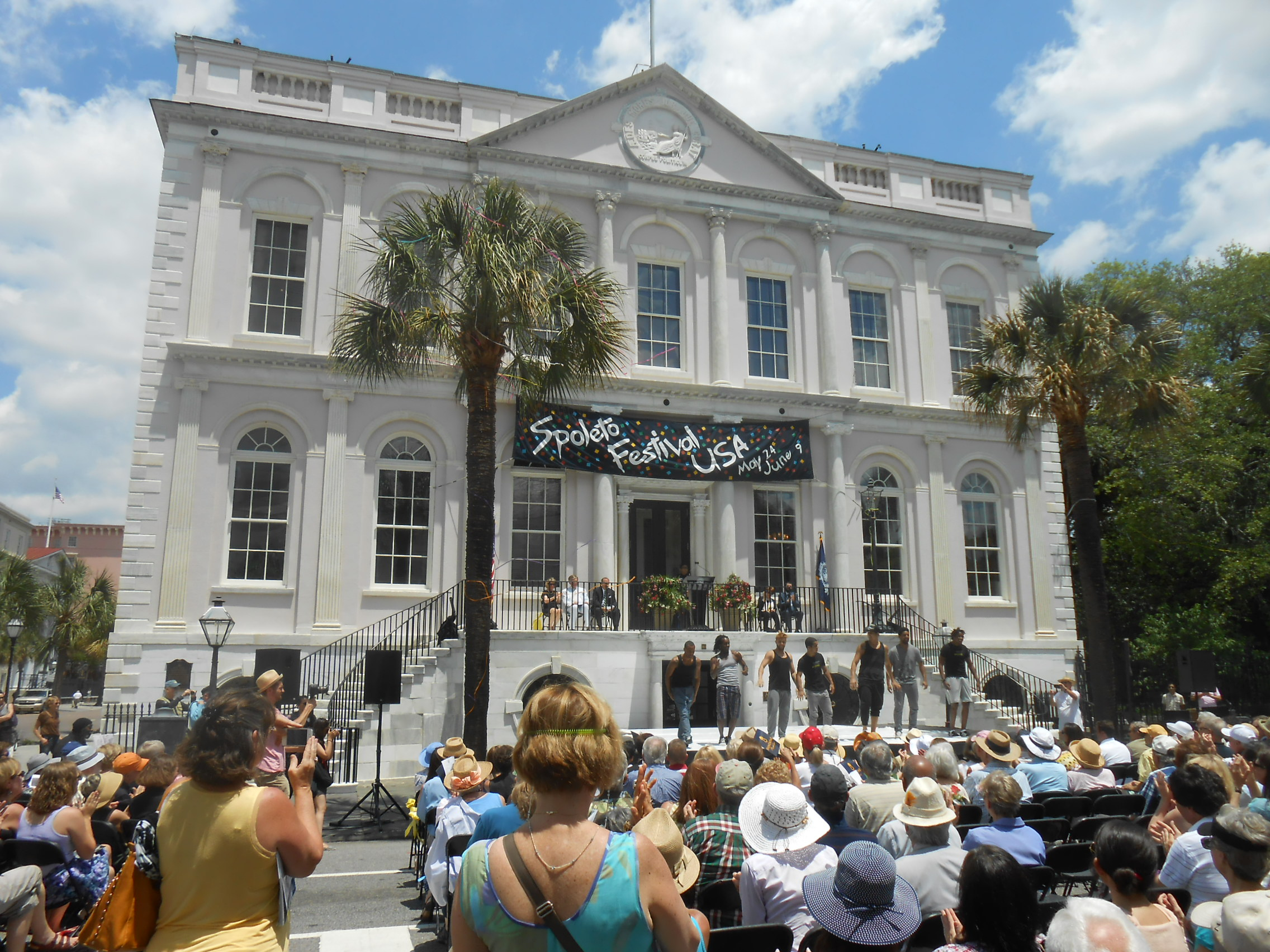
- The 2013 festival opened on May 24, 2013, with a ceremony at Charleston's City Hall
- Date: late spring
- Duration: 17 days
- Location: Charleston, South Carolina
- Theme: performing arts festival

Spoleto Festival USA is an annual performing arts festival in Charleston, South Carolina. It was founded in 1977 by Pulitzer Prize-winning composer Gian Carlo Menotti, who sought to establish a counterpart to the Festival dei Due Mondi (The Festival of Two Worlds) in Spoleto, Italy.

When Italian organizers planned an American festival, they searched for a city that would offer the charm of Spoleto, Italy, and also its wealth of theaters, churches, and other performance spaces. Charleston was selected as an ideal location, with Menotti saying of Charleston:

It's intimate, so you can walk from one theatre to the next. It has Old World charm in architecture and gardens. Yet it's a community big enough to support the large number of visitors to the festival.

The annual 17-day late-spring event showcases both established and emerging artists in more than 150 performances of opera, dance, theater, classical music, and jazz.

== History of the Charleston festival ==
=== Beginnings ===
The festival experienced financial problems from its outset which produced a quick turnover in leadership. On September 27, 1976, Theodore "Ted" Stern, the president of the College of Charleston at that time, was named as the new chairman of the Charleston Coordinating Committee after the departure of Hugh Lane. Personality disputes also arose involving Menotti. Menotti, who had served as the artistic director for the festival since its founding, claimed in 1991 that he was not interested in renewing his three-year contract when it ended in 1992 over artistic differences. The board did not officially accept his resignation immediately, but Menotti stood by his intentions, blaming artistic differences with the board and lack of personal control: "I no longer feel it is my festival, and this has been my life for 15 years. I feel a bit lonely among them. I'm treated like a clerk."

Most significantly, Menotti had a poor relationship with the festival's general manager, Nigel Redden, who challenged programming decisions, expense accounts for Menotti, and administrative decisions by Menotti. Two camps developed on the board, splitting support between those backing Redden and those who supported Menotti (including Charleston Mayor Joseph P. Riley Jr.). Mayor Riley supported Menotti so strongly that he threatened to withdraw city support for the festival if Menotti were pushed out. Eventually, in May 1991, Menotti issued an ultimatum that either Redden and his supporters resign or Menotti would. In August 1991, Redden resigned, as did 19 of the 46 board members the next month.

The tumult affected the scope of the festival the following year; the budget for 1992's festival was $4.6 million, down about $1 million from 1991, and covering about 20 percent fewer presentations (103 in 1992 compared with over 120 in 1991). In 1990 and 1991, the festival had raised about 44% of its budget (about $2.4 million) from private donations, but in 1992, the festival raised only $1.2 million from such donations, about 33% of its $3.6 million budget that year.

By 1993, personal conflicts reached a breaking point, with Menotti and the board of the Charleston festival arguing over those in charge of the festival, its artistic direction, and financing. Menotti, who had threatened the end the festival in Charleston left the festival in 1993; the local board, however, owned the rights to the name of the festival and pledged to continue it without Menotti. Milton Rhodes was appointed the general manager in November 1993, and he immediately set about righting the finances, including negotiating the cancellation of about $400,000 in debt and securing a loan from South Carolina to cover another $600,000 of debt. Still, the financial difficulties continued, and the 1995 festival lost an additional $900,000.

In July 1995, Redden was recruited to return to the festival on an interim basis to help it overcome a debt of more than $1,000,000. The 1995 festival went over budget by 20%, and its full-time staff was cut in half. During his first tenure with the festival, Redden had been successful in repairing the festival's flagging finances and left the festival having gone from a $500,000 deficit to a surplus of $1.4 million. Upon his return in 1996, Redden was again successful in turning the finances of the festival around, quickly raising $1.6 million and cutting debt in half.

=== New Leadership ===
In September 2020, Nigel Redden announced his retirement from the festival, after 35 years of involvement with Spoleto. In July 2021, the festival announced Mena Mark Hanna as its new General Director. Hanna is the first person of color to lead the festival, and the fourth general director in the festival's history. Hanna previously served as the founding dean of the Barenboim-Said Akademie in Berlin.

== The Festival's mission and programming philosophy ==
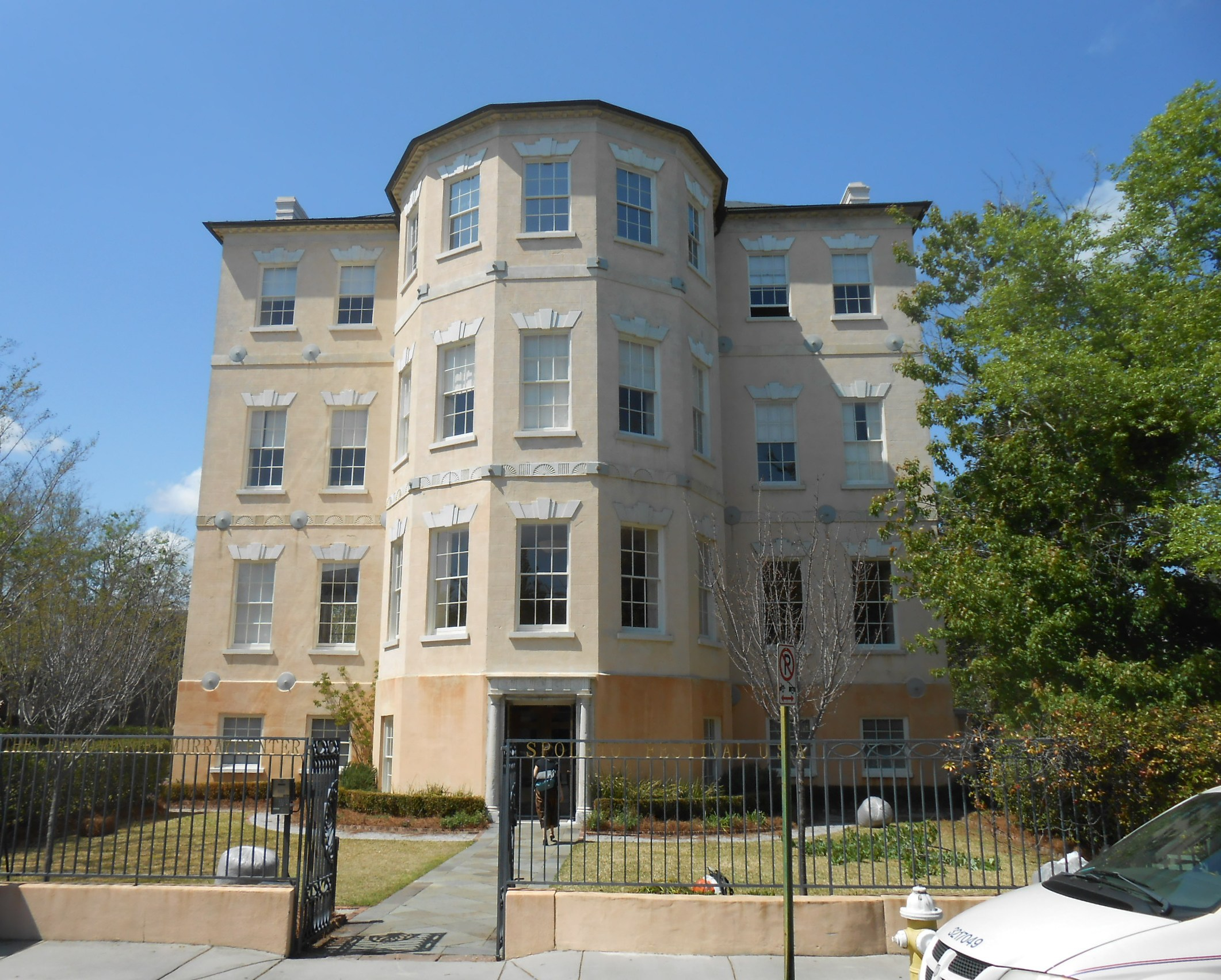
The offices of Spoleto Festival USA are located in the Middleton-Motte-Pinckney House at 14 George St., Charleston, South Carolina

The Festival's mission is to present programs of the highest artistic caliber while maintaining a dedication to young artists, a commitment to all forms of the performing arts, a passion for contemporary innovation, and an enthusiasm for providing unusual performance opportunities for established artists. One of the Festival's tenets is to provide young artists the opportunity to work with veteran directors, designers and performers. Artists who performed at Spoleto Festival USA early in their careers include Renée Fleming, Emanuel Ax, Joshua Bell, Jean-Yves Thibaudet and Yo-Yo Ma.

Each year, the Festival produces its own operas, which are often rarely performed masterpieces by well-known composers or traditional works presented in new ways. It also presents theater, dance and music programs ranging from classical to jazz, bluegrass, soul and blues. Since its inception, the Festival has presented over 200 international and U.S. premieres, notably Creve Coeur by Tennessee Williams and The American Clock by Arthur Miller. Other premieres have included Monkey: Journey to the West by Chen Shi-Zheng, Damon Albarn, and Jamie Hewlett; Peter and Wendy by Lee Breuer; The American Clock by Arthur Miller; The Mechanical Organ by the Nikolais Dance Theatre; Miracolo d’Amore by Martha Clarke; Empty Places by Laurie Anderson; Hydrogen Jukebox by Philip Glass and Allen Ginsberg; Praise House by Urban Bush Women; Three Tales by Steve Reich and Beryl Korot; and Tenebrae by Osvaldo Golijov

=== Piccolo Spoleto ===
The official companion festival to Spoleto Festival USA, is operated by the City of Charleston Office of Cultural Affairs. After two years of mini-festivals, Piccolo Spoleto was created as an official part of the overall Spoleto program in 1979. Whereas Spoleto Festival USA features artists and performers of national and international renown, Piccolo Spoleto highlights outstanding local and regional artists with several hundred performances throughout the city. Piccolo Spoleto is "the perfect complement to the international scope of its parent festival and its 700 events in 17 days transform Charleston into an exhilarating celebration of performing, literary and visual arts." Piccolo Spoleto concludes the day before the main festival with a free concert in Hampton Park. Except for 2001 (when they were held on Daniel Island), the closing ceremonies have been held at Hampton Park since 1984 when the event coincided with the reopening of the refurbished park.

== Spoleto Festival USA Orchestra ==
Each year members of the Festival Orchestra are selected by nationwide auditions to form the Festival's resident ensemble. The orchestra works with the Timothy Myers as well as with guest conductors in opera, symphonic, choral, chamber, and contemporary music performances. Over the years, the Festival Orchestra has proved to be an opportunity for young musicians to gain extensive performance experience. Alumni of the Spoleto orchestra can be found in almost every professional orchestra in the United States and many abroad.
