= Thomas Pinckney =

American statesman, diplomat and general (1750–1828)

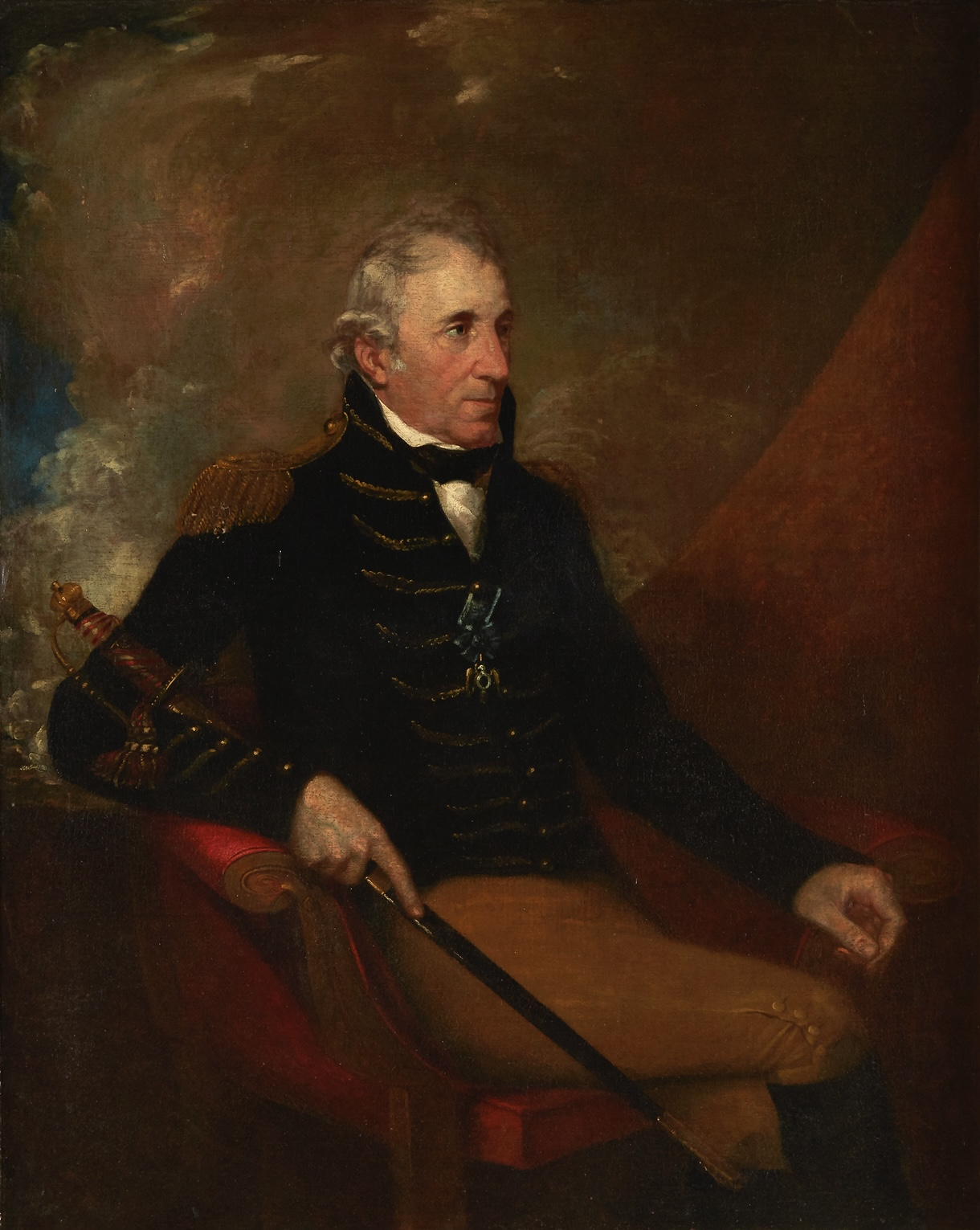
- Portrait by Samuel Morse, c. 1820

Member of the U.S. House of Representatives from South Carolina's 1st district
- In office November 23, 1797 – March 3, 1801
- Preceded by: William Smith
- Succeeded by: Thomas Lowndes

2nd United States Minister to Great Britain
- In office August 9, 1792 – July 27, 1796
- President: George Washington
- Preceded by: John Adams
- Succeeded by: Rufus King

36th Governor of South Carolina
- In office February 20, 1787 – January 26, 1789
- Lieutenant: Thomas Gadsden
- Preceded by: William Moultrie
- Succeeded by: Charles Pinckney

Personal details
- Born: October 23, 1750 Charles Town, Province of South Carolina, British America
- Died: November 2, 1828 (aged 78) Charleston, South Carolina, U.S.
- Party: Federalist
- Education: Christ Church, Oxford (BA); Special Military School of St. Cyr; Inner Temple

Military service
- Allegiance: United States
- Branch/service: Continental Army; United States Army
- Years of service: 1775–1783 (Continental); 1812–1815 (United States)
- Rank: Major (Continental); Major General (United States)
- Unit: 1st South Carolina Regiment
- Battles/wars: American Revolutionary War • Battle of Camden; War of 1812

Thomas Pinckney (October 23, 1750 – November 2, 1828) was an American statesman, diplomat, and military officer who fought in both the American Revolutionary War and the War of 1812, achieving the rank of major general. He served as 36th governor of South Carolina and as the U.S. minister to Great Britain.

Born into a prominent family in Charles Town in the Province of South Carolina, Pinckney studied in Europe before returning to America. He supported the independence cause and worked as an aide to General Horatio Gates. After the Revolutionary War, Pinckney managed his plantation and won election as Governor of South Carolina, serving from 1787 to 1789. He presided over the state convention which ratified the United States Constitution. In 1792, he accepted President George Washington's appointment to the position of minister to Britain, but was unable to win concessions regarding the impressment of American sailors. He also served as an envoy to Spain and negotiated the Treaty of San Lorenzo, which defined the border between Spain and the United States.

Following his diplomatic success in Spain, the Federalists chose Pinckney as John Adams's running mate in the 1796 presidential election. However, under the rules then in place, the individual who won the most electoral votes became president, while the individual who won the second most electoral votes became vice president. Although Adams won the presidential election, Democratic-Republican candidate Thomas Jefferson won the second most electoral votes and therefore, won election as vice president. After the election, Pinckney served in the United States House of Representatives from 1797 to 1801. His brother, Charles Cotesworth Pinckney, was the Federalist vice presidential nominee in 1800 and the party's presidential nominee in 1804 and 1808. During the War of 1812, Pinckney was commissioned as a major general.

Pinckney was elected as a member of the American Philosophical Society in 1797.

== Early life and Revolutionary War years ==
Pinckney was born on October 23, 1750, in Charlestown in the Province of South Carolina. His father, Charles Pinckney, was a prominent colonial official, while his mother, Eliza Lucas, was known for her introduction of indigo culture to the colony. Pinckney was the second of three siblings to survive to adulthood; his older sister, Harriott, later married a wealthy South Carolina planter, while his older brother, Charles Cotesworth Pinckney, became a prominent leader in South Carolina. When Pinckney was 3, his father took the family to Great Britain on colonial business, but the elder Pinckney died in 1758. His mother kept the family in Great Britain, and Pinckney studied at Westminster School, Christ Church, Oxford, and the Middle Temple. Pinckney was admitted to the bar in November 1774 and almost immediately left for South Carolina.

Though he had spent the majority of his life in England, Pinckney sympathized with the Patriot cause in the American Revolutionary War. Along with his brother, Charles, he became a captain in the Continental Army in June 1775. After seeing much action, he became an aide-de-camp to General Horatio Gates, and was captured by the British at the disastrous Battle of Camden in 1780. By that time he had married and had an infant child. He was allowed to recuperate from his wounds at his mother-in-law Rebecca Brewton Motte's plantation outside Charleston. In 1781 he and his family traveled to Philadelphia, where he was released by the British in a prisoner exchange. Pinckney returned to the South and that year fought under the Marquis de Lafayette in Virginia.

== Governor and ambassador ==
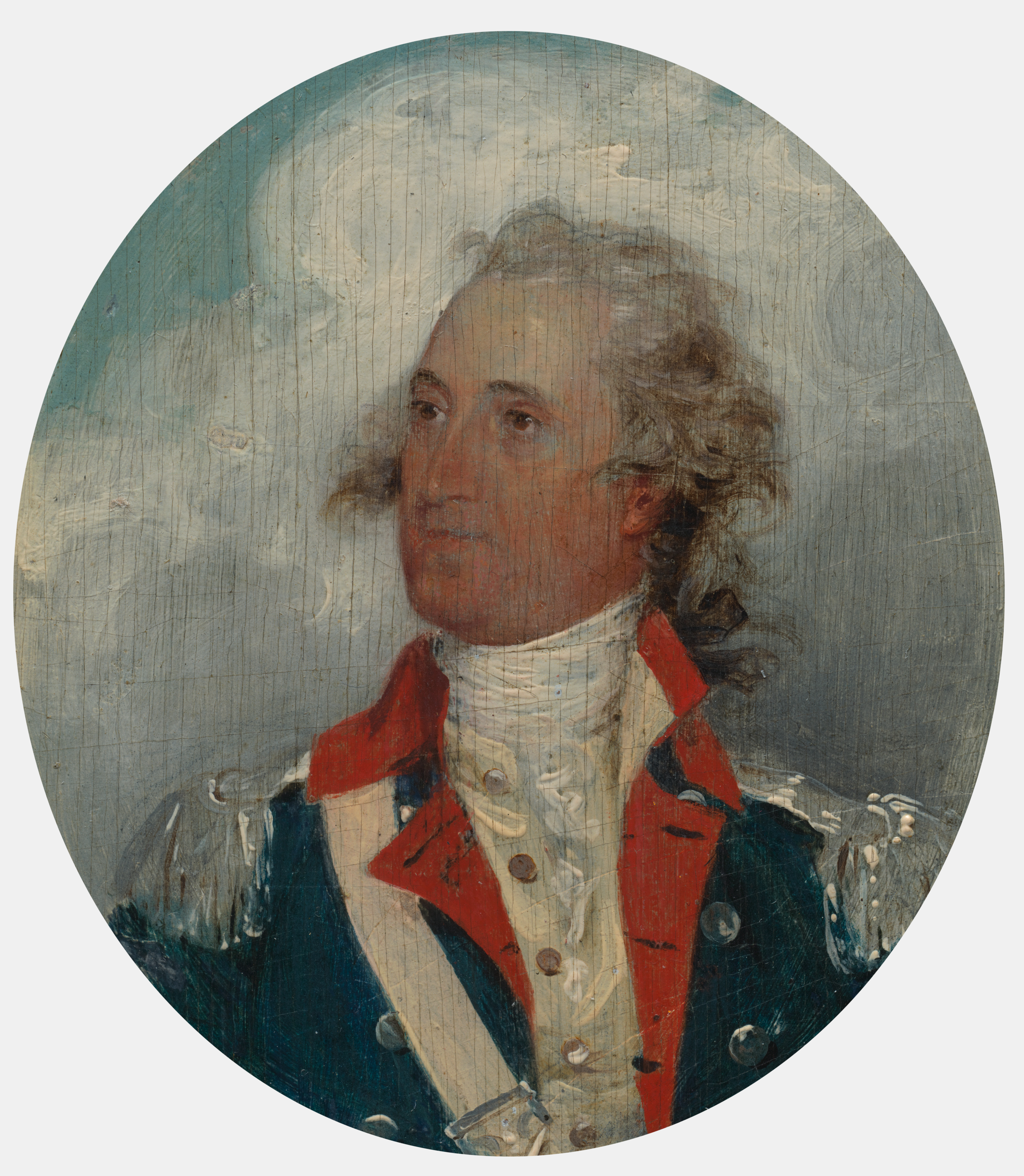
Miniature portrait by John Trumbull, c. 1791

After the war, Pinckney focused on his plantations and his legal practice. In 1787, he ran for the position of Governor of South Carolina at the urging of his friend, Edward Rutledge. Pinckney was elected governor with little opposition. He strongly favored ratification of the United States Constitution and presided over the state convention that ratified the Constitution. He served in the South Carolina House of Representatives for St. Philip's and St. Michael's Parish from January 3 to December 20, 1791.

Pinckney initially declined appointment to a federal position, but in 1792 he agreed to serve as President George Washington's ambassador to Britain. As Pinckney was unable to get the British to reach an agreement on various issues, including the practice of impressment or the evacuation of British forts in American territory, Washington dispatched John Jay as a special envoy to Britain. Pinckney helped Jay conclude the Jay Treaty, which addressed some issues between the U.S. and Britain but proved divisive in the United States. In 1795, while he continued to serve as the ambassador to Britain, Pinckney was sent to Spain to negotiate a treaty regarding boundaries and U.S. navigation on the Mississippi River. In the resulting Treaty of San Lorenzo, Spain agreed to allow Americans to export goods through the Mississippi River.

Upon his return to the United States, Pinckney joined with his mother-in-law, Rebecca Motte in developing a rice plantation known as Eldorado on the Santee River outside Charleston. She lived there with him and her daughter and grandchildren in her later years.

== Presidential election of 1796 ==
Pinckney's diplomatic success with Spain made him popular at home, and on his return the Federalist party nominated him as a candidate in the 1796 presidential election. The Federalists were strongest in the region of New England, and they hoped that Pinckney's Southern roots would help him win votes in his home region. Pinckney would be the ostensible running mate of Vice President John Adams, but under the electoral rules in place prior to the ratification of the Twelfth Amendment, each member of the Electoral College cast two votes for president with no distinction made between presidential votes and vice presidential votes. Pinckney, Adams, and the main Democratic-Republican candidates, Thomas Jefferson and Aaron Burr, each had a potential chance at winning the presidency.

Alexander Hamilton clashed with Adams over control of the Federalist Party, and he may have worked to elect Pinckney as president over Adams. Many Democratic-Republicans held favorable views of Pinckney, who had not been closely identified with the Federalist Party before 1796. Some Democratic-Republicans hoped that Pinckney could bridge partisan divides. Thus, Pinckney could potentially attract electors who would not consider voting for Adams.

In the election, most New England electors voted for the Federalist candidates, most Southern electors voted for Democratic-Republican candidates, and the two parties each received support from electors in the middle states. South Carolina split its vote between Jefferson and Pinckney, awarding each candidate 8 electoral votes. However, several New England electors, fearing the possibility of Pinckney's election over Adams, refused to vote for Pinckney. Adams finished with 71 electoral votes, Jefferson with 68 electoral votes, and Pinckney with 59 electoral votes. Adams became president and, under the rules then in place, the runner-up, Jefferson, became vice president.

== Later life ==
=== Public service ===
Pinckney was elected to the United States House of Representatives in September 1797, and served until March 1801. His service was frequently affected by poor health, and he declined to seek another term in 1800. While in Congress, he supported the Alien and Sedition Acts. He also served as one of the impeachment managers appointed by the House in 1798 to conduct the impeachment proceedings against William Blount.

After leaving Congress, Pinckney once again focused on developing his plantations. At the request of President James Madison, he returned to military service during the War of 1812. He did see battle during the war, but served as an administrator of American forces in the Southern United States. In 1826, he succeeded his brother as the president of the Society of the Cincinnati, an organization made up of veteran officers of the American Revolutionary War.

=== Denmark Vesey conspiracy ===
In 1822, news was reported of a massive planned slave uprising, to be led by Denmark Vesey, a literate free man of color. Vesey and numerous other free blacks and slaves were quickly arrested in a roundup and suppression of rebellion by authorities. Slaves constituted the majority of the population in Charleston, where there was a substantial population of free people of color. Whites long feared just such an uprising. In closed court proceedings, Vesey and numerous other suspects were convicted; they were soon executed as conspirators. Arrests continued, with some suspects deported from the country.

Pinckney published a pamphlet listing factors that he thought led to the rebellion conspiracy and should be prevented in the future.

- 1st: The example of Saint-Domingue (now Haiti), where slaves were freed by the victors in the French Revolution of 1804. Many of the freed slaves and their families resettled in the Charleston area. Vesey planned an insurrection on Bastille Day, July 14, 1822.
- 2nd: The indiscreet zeal in favor of universal liberty, expressed by many of our fellow citizens in the States north and east of Maryland; aided by the black population of those states.
- 3rd: The idleness, dissipation, and improper indulgences permitted among all classes of negroes in Charleston, and particularly among the domestic being taught to read and write. Being taught to read and write is the most dangerous.
- 4th: The facility of obtaining money afforded by the nature of their occupations to those employed as mechanics, draymen, fisherman, butchers, porters and hucksters.
- 5th: The disparity of numbers between the white and black inhabitants of the city.

=== Death ===
Pinckney died in Charleston, South Carolina, on November 2, 1828.

== Legacy and honors ==
- From at least 1801 through 1825, he and his second wife Frances Pinckney lived at a town house they built at 14 George Street, in Charleston. It is now preserved as the Middleton-Pinckney House and listed on the National Register of Historic Places.
- Pinckneyville, Georgia, was named after General Thomas Pinckney, after he traveled through the area. That town no longer exists, as its residents left to found the nearby Norcross. Pinckneyville is the name of a Middle School in Norcross.
- Pinckney, New York, was named after him.
- Pinckney was portrayed by Hugh O'Gorman in the miniseries John Adams, though he is erroneously portrayed as a United States Senator instead of Ambassador to Great Britain during the George Washington administration

== Family ==
His father, Charles Pinckney, was Chief Justice of South Carolina. His mother, Eliza Lucas, was prominent for introducing the cultivation of indigo to the colonies. His brother Charles Cotesworth Pinckney and his cousin Charles Pinckney were signers of the United States Constitution.

Pinckney first married Elizabeth Motte in 1779, a daughter of Jacob and Rebecca Brewton Motte, a planter and merchant family. After her death, he married in 1797 her younger sister, Frances, the widow of John Middleton. (He was a cousin of Arthur Middleton.) The Mottes were patriots in the Revolution.

Pinckney's elder son, Colonel Thomas Jr. (1780–1842), married Elizabeth Izard (1781–1862), a cousin twice removed of South Carolina Congressman Ralph Izard.

His younger son, named Charles Cotesworth Pinckney (1789–1865) after his brother, married Phoebe Caroline Elliott, a daughter of a South Carolina State Representative, William Elliott, and Phoebe Waight. That son served as Lt. Governor of South Carolina between 1832 and 1834.

The Pinckneys' daughter Elizabeth married William Lowndes, son of Revolutionary War-era South Carolina Governor Rawlins Lowndes. He became a leading Democratic-Republican voice in the House of Representatives from 1812 until his death in 1822. Lowndes's connection to the Pinckneys, despite their contrasting political affiliation, helped gain the younger man's election to Congress in 1811.

== Bibliography ==
- Buchanan, John (1997). The Road to Guilford Courthouse. John Wiley & Sons. ISBN 9780471327165.
- Heidenreich, Donald E. (2011). "Conspiracy Politics in the Election of 1796". New York History. 92 (3): 151–165. JSTOR 23185122.
- Pasley, Jeffrey L. (2013). The First Presidential Contest: 1796 and the Founding of American Democracy. University Press of Kansas. ISBN 978-0-7006-1907-8.
- Purcell, L. Edward (1993). Who Was Who in the American Revolution. Facts on File. ISBN 0-8160-2107-4.
- Scherr, Arthur (April 1975). "The Significance of Thomas Pinckney's Candidacy in the Election of 1796". The South Carolina Historical Magazine. 76 (2): 51–59. JSTOR 27567304.
- Southwick, Leslie (1998). Presidential Also-Rans and Running Mates, 1788 through 1996 (Second ed.). McFarland. ISBN 0-7864-0310-1.
- Williams, Francis Leigh (1978). A Founding Family: The Pinckneys of South Carolina. Harcourt Brace Jovanovich. ISBN 978-0151315031.

Political offices
Preceded by William Moultrie	Governor of South Carolina; 1787–1789	Succeeded by Charles Pinckney
Diplomatic posts
Preceded by John Adams	United States Minister to the United Kingdom; 1792–1796	Succeeded by Rufus King
Party political offices
Preceded by John Adams	Federalist nominee for Vice President of the United States; 1796	Succeeded by Charles Cotesworth Pinckney
U.S. House of Representatives
Preceded by William Smith	Member of the U.S. House of Representatives from South Carolina's 1st congressional district 1797–1801	Succeeded by Thomas Lowndes
Non-profit organization positions
Preceded by Charles Cotesworth Pinckney	President General of the Society of the Cincinnati; 1825–1828	Succeeded by Aaron Ogden
