= National Register of Historic Places listings in Vermilion Parish, Louisiana =

Location of Vermilion Parish in Louisiana

This is a list of the National Register of Historic Places listings in Vermilion Parish, Louisiana.

This is intended to be a complete list of the properties and districts on the National Register of Historic Places in Vermilion Parish, Louisiana, United States. The locations of National Register properties and districts for which the latitude and longitude coordinates are included below, may be seen in a map.

There are 20 properties and districts listed on the National Register in the parish.

This National Park Service list is complete through NPS recent listings posted November 28, 2025.

== Current listings ==
	Name on the Register	Image	Date listed	Location	City or town	Description
1	A La Bonne Veillee	A La Bonne Veillee	October 25, 1984 (#84000079)	Northeast of Abbeville; 30°02′17″N 92°01′41″W	Abbeville	
2	Abbeville Commercial Historic District	Abbeville Commercial Historic District	May 21, 1987 (#87000767)	Roughly bounded by Concord, State, Lafayette, and Jefferson Sts. 29°58′25″N 92°08′09″W	Abbeville	
3	Abbeville Residential Historic District	Abbeville Residential Historic District	September 8, 1987 (#87001500)	Roughly bounded by W. Oak, W. State, and Cherry Sts., and the Vermilion River; 29°58′44″N 92°08′08″W	Abbeville	
4	Bank of Gueydan	Bank of Gueydan	May 10, 1990 (#90000747)	214 Main St. 30°01′28″N 92°30′45″W	Gueydan	
5	Beard Congregational Church	Beard Congregational Church	October 5, 2015 (#15000700)	402 Granger St. 29°57′22″N 92°02′16″W	Erath	
6	Ovide Broussard House	Ovide Broussard House	September 29, 1995 (#95001136)	309 E. St. Victor St. 29°58′29″N 92°07′56″W	Abbeville	
7	Caldwell House	Caldwell House	November 22, 1995 (#95001321)	105 E. Vermilion St. 29°58′35″N 92°08′04″W	Abbeville	
8	Chauviere House	Chauviere House	September 29, 1995 (#95001144)	108 N. Louisiana; 29°58′27″N 92°07′59″W	Abbeville	
9	Downtown Abbeville Historic District	Downtown Abbeville Historic District	November 7, 1995 (#95001261)	Roughly bounded by State and 1st Sts., Vermilion Bayou, and Pere Megret and Concord Sts. 29°58′20″N 92°08′16″W	Abbeville	
10	Gordy House	Gordy House	September 29, 1995 (#95001131)	503 Charity St. 29°58′24″N 92°07′52″W	Abbeville	
11	Landry Plantation House	Landry Plantation House	November 8, 2002 (#02001296)	1320 Gallett Rd. 30°04′52″N 92°04′17″W	Youngsville	
12	LeBlanc House	LeBlanc House	April 15, 1982 (#82002800)	North of Erath on Louisiana Highway 339; 30°02′17″N 92°01′41″W	Erath	
13	Lyons House	Lyons House	September 29, 1995 (#95001129)	315 N. St. Charles St. 29°58′38″N 92°08′03″W	Abbeville	
14	Narrows Plantation House	Narrows Plantation House	May 9, 1985 (#85000976)	Off Louisiana Highway 717 on the southern shore of Lake Arthur; 30°03′17″N 92°41′40″W	Lake Arthur	
15	Perry House	Perry House	November 16, 1987 (#87002025)	Orange Dr. 29°57′03″N 92°09′16″W	Perry	
16	Richard Cattle Auction Barn	Richard Cattle Auction Barn	September 16, 1997 (#97001127)	1307 S. Henry St. 29°58′06″N 92°09′18″W	Abbeville	
17	St. Mary Congregational Church	St. Mary Congregational Church	August 12, 1999 (#99000983)	213 S. Louisiana Ave. 29°58′17″N 92°08′03″W	Abbeville	
18	St. Mary Magdalen Church, Rectory, and Cemetery	St. Mary Magdalen Church, Rectory, and Cemetery	February 11, 1988 (#88000116)	Pere Megret and Main St. 29°58′28″N 92°08′15″W	Abbeville	
19	Dr. Joseph Angel Villien House	Dr. Joseph Angel Villien House	August 2, 2001 (#01000806)	200 W. Joseph St. 30°06′22″N 92°07′41″W	Maurice	
20	James Hugh Williams House	James Hugh Williams House	January 29, 2014 (#13001129)	401 N. St. Charles; 29°58′39″N 92°08′02″W	Abbeville	

== See also ==
- List of National Historic Landmarks in Louisiana
- National Register of Historic Places listings in Louisiana
