= Abbeville Historic District =

Abbeville Historic District may refer to:

- Abbeville Commercial Historic District, Abbeville, Louisiana, listed on the National Register of Historic Places (NRHP) in Vermilion Parish, Louisiana
- Abbeville Residential Historic District, Abbeville, Louisiana, listed on the NRHP in Vermilion Parish, Louisiana
- Downtown Abbeville Historic District, Abbeville, Louisiana, listed on the NRHP in Vermilion Parish, Louisiana
- Abbeville (Lancaster, Pennsylvania), NRHP-listed
- Abbeville Historic District (Abbeville, South Carolina), NRHP-listed

== See also ==
- Abbeville (disambiguation)
