= Abbeville (disambiguation) =

Abbeville is a city in northern France.

Abbeville may also refer to:

== Places ==
=== France ===
- Abbeville-Saint-Lucien, Oise
- Abbéville-la-Rivière, Essonne
- Abbéville-lès-Conflans, Meurthe-et-Moselle

=== Ireland ===
- Abbeville, Dublin, a country house
- Abbeville, County Tipperary (townland)
- Abbeville, Tipperary, a country house

=== United States ===
- Abbeville, Alabama, a city
- Abbeville, Georgia, a city
- Abbeville, Louisiana, a small city
- Abbeville, Mississippi, a town
- Abbeville (Lancaster, Pennsylvania), a historic home
- Abbeville, South Carolina, a city

=== United Kingdom ===
- Abbeville Village, a residential neighbourhood in London

== See also ==
- Abbeville Publishing Group, a publisher
- Abbeville Institute, a non-profit organization
- Abbeville County, South Carolina
- Abbeville Historic District (disambiguation)
- Abbyville, Kansas
- Abbeyville (disambiguation)
