= Langdon Cheves =

American politician (1776–1857)

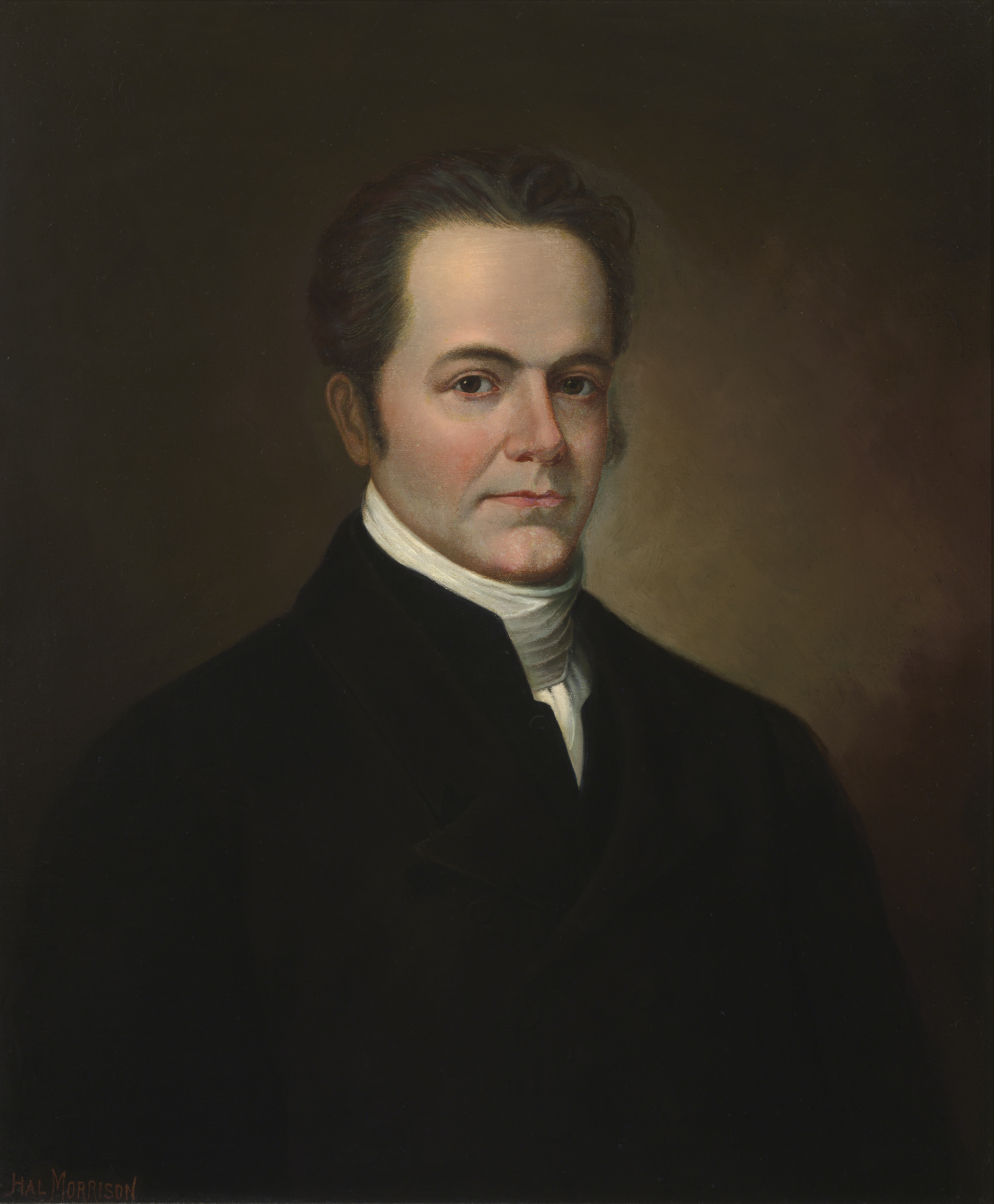
- Posthumous portrait, c. 1912

President of the Second Bank of the United States
- In office March 6, 1819 – January 6, 1823
- President: James Monroe
- Preceded by: James Fisher (acting)
- Succeeded by: Nicholas Biddle

8th Speaker of the United States House of Representatives
- In office January 19, 1814 – March 3, 1815
- Preceded by: Henry Clay
- Succeeded by: Henry Clay

Member of the U.S. House of Representatives from South Carolina's 1st district
- In office December 31, 1810 – March 3, 1815
- Preceded by: Robert Marion
- Succeeded by: Henry Middleton

Attorney General of South Carolina
- In office December 8, 1808 – December 4, 1810
- Governor: John Drayton
- Preceded by: John Pringle
- Succeeded by: John Richardson

Member of the South Carolina House of Representatives from the Parish of St. Philip and St. Martin
- In office November 22, 1802 – 1804
- In office 1806 – December 8, 1808

Personal details
- Born: September 17, 1776 Abbeville County, South Carolina, U.S.
- Died: June 26, 1857 (aged 80) Columbia, South Carolina, U.S.
- Party: Democratic-Republican
- Spouse: Mary Dulles
- Children: 14, including Louisa

Langdon Cheves (/ˈtʃɪvɪs/ September 17, 1776 – June 26, 1857) was an American politician, lawyer and businessman from South Carolina. He represented the city of Charleston in the United States House of Representatives from 1810 to 1815, where he played a key role on the home front of the War of 1812. Cheves was a leader among the War Hawk faction of the House. He served as chairman of the Committees on Naval Affairs and Ways and Means under Speaker of the House Henry Clay, then succeeded Clay as Speaker in the war's final stages. After leaving the House, he served as President of the Second Bank of the United States from 1819 to 1823.

After leaving public office, Cheves was an active advocate for unified Southern resistance to protective tariffs and any attempt to abolish slavery, though an opponent of unilateral action by South Carolina or any one state. Originally, Cheves advocated for a convention of Southern states to pressure Congress into adopting these positions, but eventually became one of the earliest advocates for outright regional secession from the United States.

== Early life ==
Langdon Cheves was born on September 17, 1776, at Bulltown Fort, on the Rocky River in South Carolina. His father, Alexander, was a native of Buchan, Aberdeenshire, Scotland. His mother, Mary Langdon, was from Virginia and had migrated to the South Carolina backcountry with her father, a farmer and doctor. Their neighbors included Andrew Pickens and the Calhoun family.

Cheves was born in Bulltown Fort amidst an ongoing war between the Scots-Irish settlers and the Cherokee, which settlers attributed to British instigation at the onset of the American Revolution. Cheves's pregnant mother was sheltered at the fort for her protection. Shortly after his birth, his maternal aunt left the fort for supplies and was killed and scalped by enemy forces.

His mother died on November 20, 1779. Cheves later described standing at his mother's grave as his earliest childhood memory. He was shortly thereafter placed in the care of his paternal aunt and uncle, Thomas and Margaret (née Agnew) Cheves. Cheves's father Alexander enlisted in the Loyalist cause under Major John Hamilton, but his brother Thomas was a Patriot who fought under Andrew Pickens at the Battle of Kettle Creek. After the Loyalist cause became dire in 1782, Alexander Cheves transferred his property to Langdon, likely in fear of confiscation. He entered exile, first in Nova Scotia and then in London. He was not received favorably by British courts and was not remunerated for his service and decided to return to America.

Langdon was raised by his aunt and uncle on their family farm with four younger cousins. When they reached an appropriate age, the children began studies under Andrew Weed, a community leader and ruling elder in the local Presbyterian Church. The studies centered on the Westminster Catechism.

In 1785, Alexander Cheves returned from exile with his second wife, Susannah Craig, established a business in Charleston, and retrieved his son Langdon from his brother. Langdon continued his formal education from 1786 to 1788 with a Scottish schoolmaster who eliminated his backcountry drawl through corporal punishment. Around 1790, his father purchased a house slave named Phoebe.

== Early career ==
=== Business career ===
At age 12, Langdon's father withdrew him from school and apprenticed him to James Jaffray, a merchant, Glasgow native, and fellow member of the city's St. Andrew's Society. Langdon started by performing menial tasks at the Charleston shop before being promoted to supercargo to accompany shipments to and from Edisto Island. By 1792, at age 16, he had been promoted to chief clerk. In this role, he met and impressed many of the city's key merchants, including John Potter, from whom Cheves personally secured a loan for the business and who later, as a director of the Bank of the United States, secured Cheves's election as its president.

=== Legal career ===
In spite of the advice of his friends, who thought him "born to be a merchant," Cheves began studying law at age 18. His early education was largely self-taught from a personal library, but he hired a personal tutor for French and Latin. After the death of his employer James Jaffray on October 15, 1795, Cheves met William Marshall, an attorney assigned to Jaffray's estate and future judge of the South Carolina Court of Equity. Cheves applied to read law in Marshall's office, and his apprenticeship began in early 1796. Although South Carolina law required four years of reading for non-college graduates, Cheves appeared for examination before the bar on October 13, 1797, and passed.

He opened an office in Charleston which he rented from Elihu H. Bay and shared with Robert James Turnbull. To improve his public speaking, Cheves joined a Philomathean Debating Society, which doubled as a social club. There, he met William Lowndes.

By May 1800, Cheves's practice and social standing had grown. He had purchased a slave to serve as a personal servant, improved his dress, and applied to practice before the United States Court for District of South Carolina. In 1801, he accepted a partnership with Joseph Peace, a Quaker and native to the West Indies. The partnership was a financial success; each man made over $10,000 annually, and in its final two years from 1807 to 1809, each made $20,000 (approximately $403,125 in 2025).

When he became Attorney General of the state of South Carolina in 1808, the firm's work and prestige expanded dramatically. Among Cheves's young private clerks during these two years were John M. Felder, John Laurens North, Thomas Smith Grimké, and future U.S. Senator Robert Young Hayne. Cheves would later bestow his legal practice on Hayne.

In the summer of 1807, Peace announced his plans to leave Charleston for Philadelphia, and Cheves, who believed Peace had not fulfilled his share of the partnership, eagerly arranged the firm's dissolution. He planned to retire from law, but first accepted a one-year partnership with Amos B. Northrup.

== State politics ==
In summer 1798, stemming from outrage over French mistreatment of American ambassador and Charleston native Charles Cotesworth Pinckney, Cheves joined and became a treasurer of the Charleston Federalist Company, an informal social-military group formed to defend the harbor in the event of an ostensible French invasion.

On March 9, 1802, Cheves was elected to the Charleston City Council to succeed William Lee.

=== South Carolina House of Representatives ===
In October 1802, he was elected to represent the city (as the Parish of St. Philip and St. Michael) in the South Carolina House of Representatives. By this time, the Federalist Party was in rapid decline in the state, even its previous stronghold of Charleston. Cheves was identified with the younger Republican faction. He was not actively involved in the business of the House, focusing instead on his legal practice and declining to run for re-election in 1804.

Cheves returned to politics in 1806, running for the House again at the head of the Republican ticket. He received more votes than any other candidate. Upon the start of the new term, Cheves was appointed chair of the Judiciary Committee and the Committee on Privileges and Elections.

In a special legislative session, Cheves took an active part in the reapportionment of the state to address the disproportionate representation of Lowcountry whites. The resultant constitutional amendment, known as the "Compromise of 1808," was guided by William Lowndes and resulted in permanent control by the combined planter aristocracy.

=== 1808 presidential election ===
In the wake of the Chesapeake–Leopard affair, Cheves served with Charles Cotesworth Pinckney, Thomas Pinckney, and William Washington on a non-partisan committee enforcing Charleston resolutions requiring ten days' mourning and barring assistance to British ships. Cheves also anonymously (as "Aristides") wrote editorials in support of President Thomas Jefferson and the Embargo of 1807.

He endorsed James Madison over Charles Pinckney, urged the election of pro-Madison Representatives, and stood for re-election as one such Representative. He was elected by the legislature to head the electoral ticket and cast his vote for Madison.

=== South Carolina Attorney General ===
On December 7, 1808, Cheves was elected South Carolina Attorney General. In this role, he advised Governor John Drayton on legal matters, personally represented the state in the eastern circuit courts, and expanded his private practice.

== U.S. House of Representatives ==
=== Elections ===
==== 1810 ====
As the embargo on European goods dragged on, the South Carolina economy suffered. Rice prices were halved and cotton collapsed. By 1810, Charlestonians and South Carolinians at large were deeply discontent with the 11th Congress and President Madison. With the Federalist Party now a non-factor, the election was contested between competing Republican factions.

Alongside E.S. Thomas of the City Gazette, friends of Thomas Jefferson including Charles Pinckney supported William Loughton Smith, a former Federalist Congressman who had served as John Adams's minister to Portugal. However, a much larger portion of the party in Charleston favored Cheves, and the Smith supporters eventually got in line. The election was held October 10–11, but was overshadowed by a fire in the city that destroyed 194 houses. Cheves was elected without opposition. The other new members of the delegation were William Lowndes, representing Columbia and John C. Calhoun of the Upstate.

Shortly after his election to the House, incumbent Robert Marion resigned early, triggering a special election to complete his term. Cheves won unopposed and took his seat early in the 11th Congress.

==== 1812 ====
In 1812, Cheves was re-elected to the 13th Congress. His opponent was the leader of the South Carolina Federalists, John Rutledge Jr. Cheves was attacked for his support of the War, especially in light of his 1808 letters which vigorously opposed "war for commerce." Federalists also accused Cheves of private discrimination against immigrants. He remained personally aloof from the campaign, only writing to assure his constituents that he acknowledged their confidence and valued it "more highly than money." He won re-election comfortably, 1,581–839.

=== Committee assignments ===
During his brief first term in office, during the 11th Congress, Cheves served on two minor select committees: one dealing with bank incorporations and the other on the completion of the 1810 Census.

In his second term, Cheves served on the Committee on Ways and Means and chaired of the Select Committee on Naval Affairs. He became acting chair of Ways and Means on April 27, 1812.

=== War of 1812 ===
Immediately upon his arrival in Washington, Cheves was faced with the brewing international crisis that eventually resulted in the War of 1812. British impressment of Americans had become less frequent, but both Britain and France maintained obstacles to American trade with the other. The House had recently passed Macon's Bill Number 2 in retaliation, and Napoleon had relaxed the French restrictions. In a debate over repealing Macon's Bill, Cheves delivered a careful maiden speech critical of the bill as feeble and calling for a "more direct and proper course." He was immediately identified as a "War Hawk".

==== War Mess ====
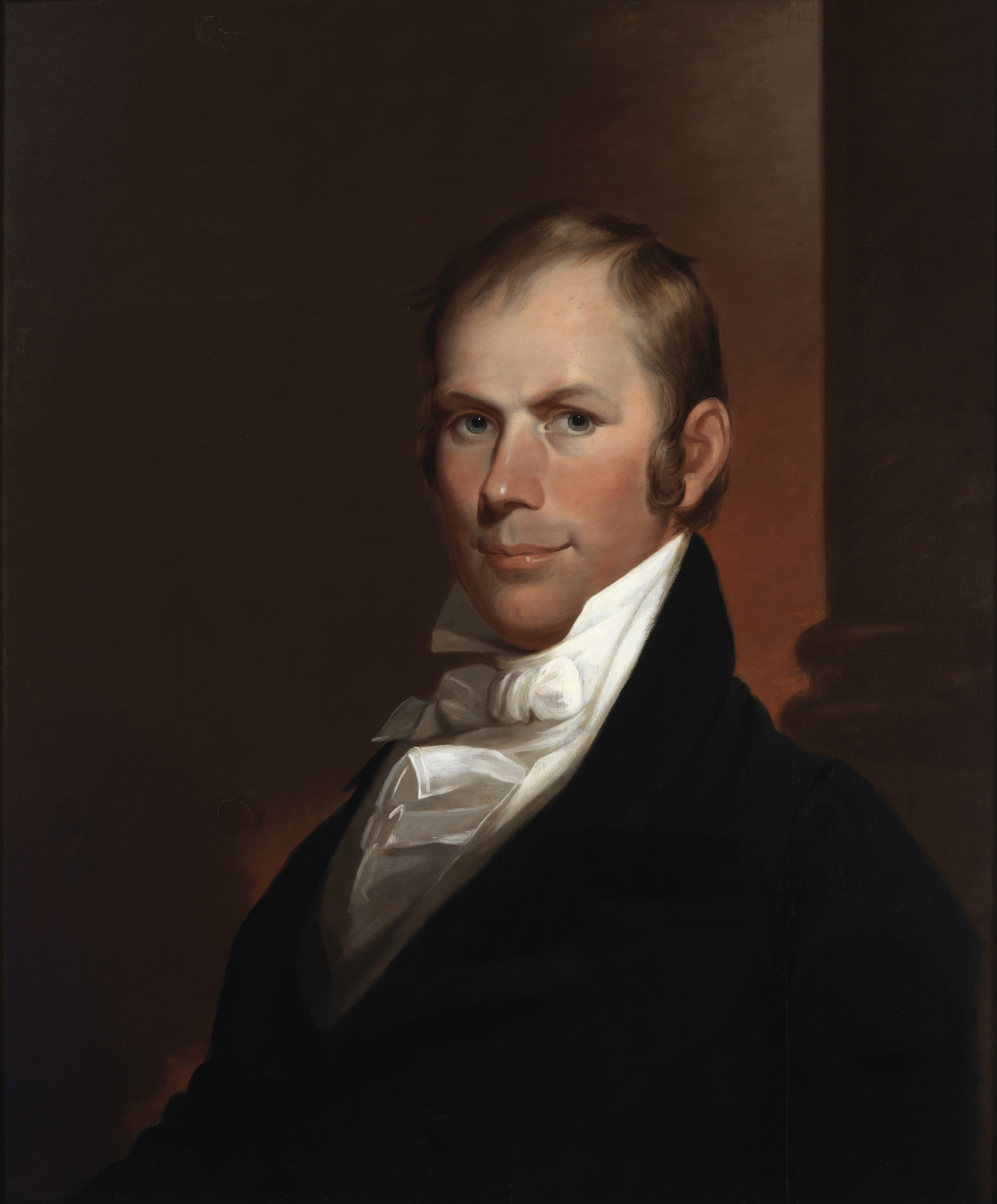
The election of Cheves's housemate Henry Clay as Speaker of the House marked the opening victory for the war faction in the 12th Congress.

In the 12th Congress, to which Cheves had originally been elected, his housemates included Lowndes, Calhoun, fellow Hawk Henry Clay, Clay's rival Felix Grundy, and Senator George M. Bibb. The building came to be called the "War Mess" and served as a meeting place for pro-War leaders of Congress and Secretary of State James Monroe, who acted as liaison to the President. As a consequence, the residents of the house were among the best informed Representatives in the 12th Congress.

At the opening of the Congress in a special session on November 4, 1811, Clay was overwhelmingly elected Speaker of the House. He proceeded to appoint War Mess men to key committee posts. Calhoun and Grundy were appointed on the Foreign Relations Committee, Lowndes on Commerce and Manufactures, and Cheves was given the chairmanship of the Select Committee on Naval Affairs. He was made second man on the powerful Committee on Ways and Means.

In March 1812, the War Mess privately pressed Madison, through Monroe, to request an embargo of British trade, followed by formal declaration of war from Congress. Madison eventually agreed, and the United States formally declared war against Great Britain on June 18. Cheves later remembered that the War Mess were "like school boys, [they] sprang up, and in the excess of their joy danced... a reel."

==== Naval Affairs ====
As chairman of the Committee on Naval Affairs, Cheves had a key role in preparedness and appropriations for the potential war ahead. He began by submitting detailed requests to Secretary of the Navy Paul Hamilton and Secretary of War William Eustis. By December, he had catalogued the nation's limited naval strength and begun to plan, with Hamilton's and Eustis's advice, appropriations for additional ships and fortifications.

On December 17, 1811, he submitted two reports on naval affairs. The first recommended $1,000,000 (approximately 19,350,000 in 2025) "for the defense of our maritime frontier" by refortifying existing defenses. The second authorized the purchase of ship timber, repair of all vessels not in use, the establishment of a national repair dock, and the construction of ten additional frigates, "averaging thirty-eight guns."

Cheves delivered a speech on behalf of the committee on January 17, 1812, defending a reinvigorated Navy as the only effective protection for American "commerce and our neutral rights on the ocean." The bill was opposed by orthodox Jeffersonians like David R. Williams, who had long opposed the existence of any Navy whatsoever. The sections providing for the construction of new ships and a new dockyard were struck down, but the timber purchase and repair provisions passed on January 29. The maritime fortifications bill passed overwhelmingly, 88–25, on February 4. Cheves's forceful advocacy for the Navy led former Federalist Samuel Taggart to remark, "whatever [Cheves] may be nominally he is in reality as high a toned Federalist as ever was Alexander Hamilton."

==== Ways and Means ====
As the second ranking member on the Ways and Means Committee, Cheves also had a key role in securing the appropriations to fund the War. Secretary of the Treasury Albert Gallatin estimated the war would require about $21,000,000 in new revenues, with about half in debt and half raised in new taxes.

After a new embargo went into effect on April 1, 1812, the House declined to recess. Ways and Means chair Ezekiel Bacon, took a leave of absence on April 27, making Cheves the acting chairman of the powerful committee as the war began.

One of Cheves's primary goals on Ways and Means was to persuade those who feared higher internal taxes or the restraining commercial effect on tariffs to join the war effort. To lighten the tax burden, Cheves attempted to repeal the Non-Intercourse Act of 1809 in order to use the duties assessed on imports to lower internal taxes. Cheves introduced the repeal bill on June 19, the day after war was declared; repeal was defeated on June 25, with Speaker Clay casting the deciding vote in opposition.

==== Break with Clay ====
In November 1812, following the July recess and his re-election to a second term, Cheves returned to the House to secure funding for the war. The ensuing debate divided the War Mess between the South Carolinians, who favored free trade and internal taxes, and the Speaker Clay, Felix Grundy and other Republicans. The primary issue was the seizure of merchants' bonds: bonds purchased by American merchants who imported British goods during a gap in the embargo.

They purchased these bonds against their goods, which were then sold at an extremely high profit due to wartime inflation. Cheves, along with Calhoun and Lowndes, opposed efforts to allow the Secretary of the Treasury, Albert Gallatin, to seize the bonds. Cheves was outvoted in committee but refused to defend the proposal in front of the House, deferring to Richard Mentor Johnson to advocate in his place.

In response to Johnson's advocacy, Cheves attacked the measure as an impermissible delegation of Congress's legislative authority. He extended his criticism to Clay's general program of restrictive economics, arguing that it devastated the American coastal economy in striking at the British. When Clay attempted to introduce a measure to preserve the protective system but exempt the bonds at issue, Cheves, Calhoun, and Lowndes maintained their opposition. Ultimately, the Ways and Means report was defeated in the House on December 11 by a vote of 49–52; the South Carolinians won, but at the expense of unity within the War faction. After Cheves was unable to push through any internal tax increase by the end of the term in March, the House approved a $5,000,000 issue of Treasury notes and a $16,000,000 loan at Secretary Gallatin's request.

Cheves's declaration against Clay's protective system caused issues at home as well as in Washington. Governor of South Carolina Joseph Alston called Cheves a "political Jesuit" and declared his seat (as well as those of the other South Carolina representatives) vacant for the next term on the technicality that Cheves had not notified the governor of his acceptance. Charlestonians denounced Alston until he bowed to pressure and delivered the commissions.

=== 13th Congress ===
Upon his arrival in Washington for the 13th Congress in March 1813, Cheves learned that Clay had stripped him of all committee assignments.

As a result, he had little involvement in the debates over national policy and focused his efforts on securing Charleston against the threat of a British invasion. In June, Cheves personally lobbied Secretary of War John Armstrong Jr. to allow Thomas Pinckney, in command of the Southern Department of the War, to disperse his troops along the coast. He voted against President Madison's proposed embargo, which passed regardless and further alienated New England Federalists.

== Speaker of the House ==
On January 14, 1814, President Madison nominated a commission to negotiate peace with Britain, including Albert Gallatin, John Quincy Adams, and Speaker Henry Clay. With Clay out of the country, he was forced to resign his office, triggering an election to succeed him on January 19. The Federalists threw their support to Cheves, who won a slight majority over Felix Grundy, who had the support of the majority of the Republican caucus, and former Speaker Nathaniel Macon of North Carolina. Clay urged the Republicans to unite behind Cheves.

As Speaker, Cheves was a strict parliamentarian. He demanded members confine their remarks to the motion pending and did not tolerate personal attacks, as had been frequent under Clay. He made only one speech, lamenting losses in the war but urging the government to continue to prosecute it vigorously. By April, with Napoleon on the verge of apparent defeat and Britain threatening total domination over maritime commerce, Cheves successfully saw repeal of Clay's restrictive system. He soon thereafter returned to Charleston and informed party leaders that he would not be a candidate for re-election to a third term.

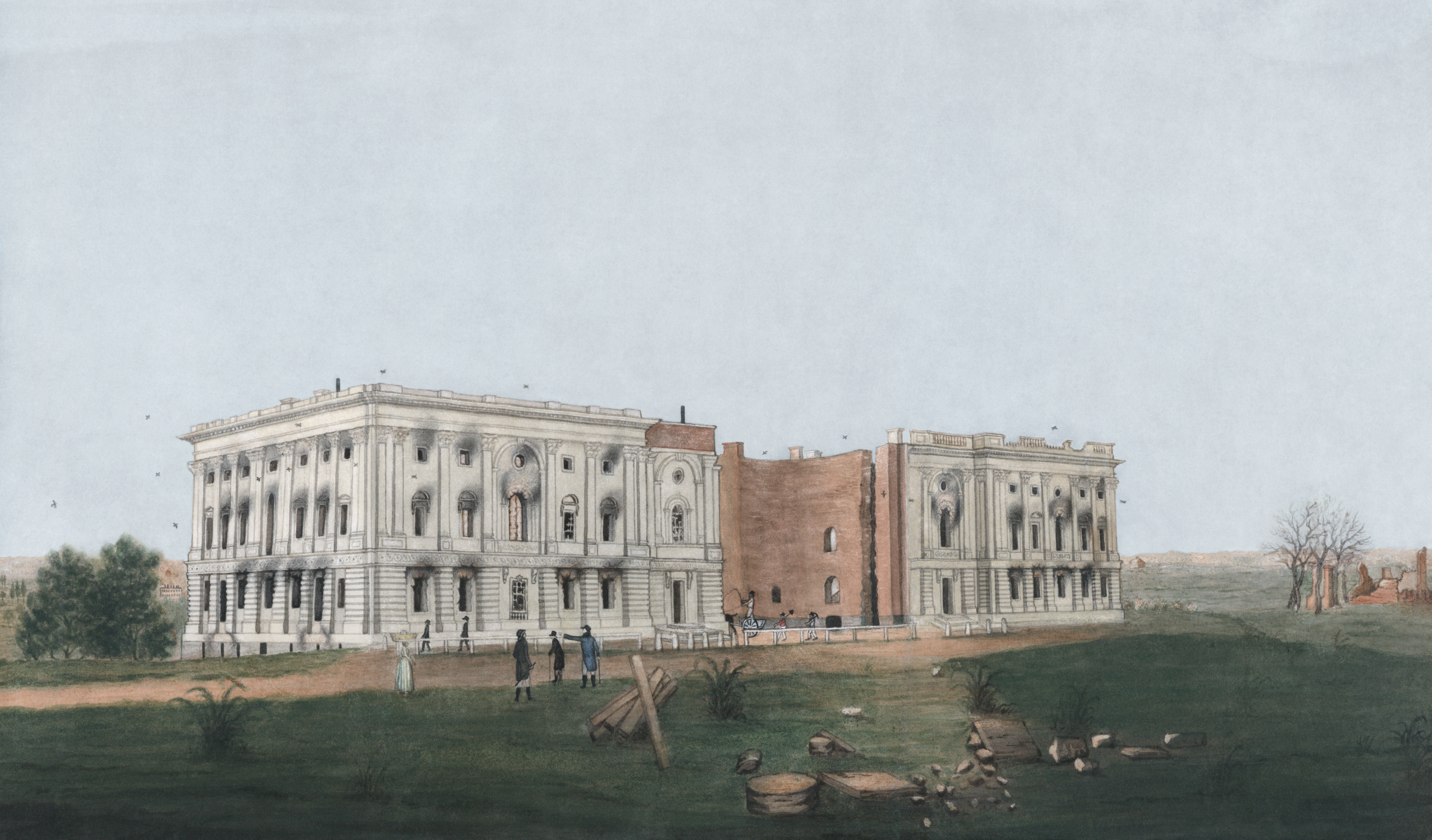
In August 1814, during Cheves's tenure as Speaker, the British captured and destroyed much of Washington. For the remainder of his time in office, Congress was forced to meet in the Post and Patent Office building.

In September, Congress returned urgently to Washington for a special session. On August 24, with Washington evacuated, the British had burned the capital. The night after, a tornado destroyed much of what remained. The House relocated to a small room in the General Post and Patent Office Building, itself a former hotel.

=== Defeating the Second National Bank ===
In addition to the physical destruction the capital, Congress faced a budget crisis; $74,000,000 was necessary to keep the government solvent. Treasury Secretary George W. Campbell resigned rather than offer a solution, and banks throughout the country had begun to suspend cash payments. Cheves himself declined President Madison's offer to serve as Campbell's successor; instead, Madison appointed Alexander J. Dallas.

To persuade banks to subscribe to government loans, Dallas suggested the imposition of new taxes and the revival of the national bank. Republicans defeated efforts to recharter the First National Bank in 1811, but were willing to contemplate a new charter given the present crisis. Dallas presented a plan recommending $50,000,000 in bank capital, $6,000,000 in specie and the remainder in government bonds. The government would subscribe $20,000,000. John C. Calhoun, with Cheves's backing, counter-proposed a bank to serve the financial community that would bar investors from buying stock using Treasury notes issued during the war.

On January 2, the Dallas plan came before the House. Cheves cast the deciding vote against the bill. He argued instead for an independent bank, as the Calhoun plan provided. The bill failed 80–81, but was passed on reconsideration on January 7; Madison vetoed the bill.

=== Other acts ===
In September, Cheves cast the tie-breaking vote in the House to relocate the capital from Washington, but the House reversed itself a week later with no alternate location selected.

When Vice President Elbridge Gerry died on November 23, 1814, the office of President pro tempore of the Senate was vacant, and so Cheves briefly became next in line for the presidency. This status lasted for two days until Senator John Gaillard was chosen president pro tempore.

After his term expired, he devoted himself exclusively to his law practice in Charleston bar. In 1815, he was made a judge of the superior court of South Carolina.

Cheves was appointed chief commissioner of claims under the Treaty of Ghent.

== President of the Bank of the United States ==
=== Background ===
Shortly after Cheves left office in March 1815, President Madison successfully lobbied the new 14th Congress to re-charter the National Bank, headquartered in Philadelphia and governed along much the same lines as its 1791 predecessor. Madison and Secretary Dallas successfully installed William Jones as its first President.

Under Jones's leadership, the Bank was soon overextended through branch loans and the decision to accept promissory notes, often backed in its own stock, from subscribers in lieu of specie. Nevertheless, the Bank initially flourished in the booming post-war economy.

Jones's tenure came to an end in January 1819. At that time, the country was experiencing a financial panic, the Panic of 1819, which left the Bank on the brink of collapse. Cheves himself later referred to the Bank during this period as "a ship without a rudder or sails, on short allowance of provisions and water, on a stormy sea and far from land." It paused operations on July 20, 1818, and demanded payment of specie from state banks, bankrupting many and leading to a wave of resentment.

=== Election ===
In December 1818, Charleston stockholders in the Second Bank asked Cheves for his permission to propose his name for the Bank presidency at the upcoming board meeting, and he consented. Cheves was himself a founding but inactive member of the board of the Charleston branch, who later described himself as "ignorant and unapprehensive of the situation of the bank."

His Charleston supporters enlisted the powerful support of Stephen Girard of Philadelphia and Alexander Brown of Baltimore. They elected Cheves to the board of the directors on January 5, 1819, but with no desire for a divisive leadership fight, failed to unseat Jones as president. Cheves accepted his seat with hopes that he would be elevated in 1820 when Jones, then ill, retired. Instead, Jones and the board were indicted by a House select committee chaired by John Canfield Spencer for violations of the Bank charter, poor management, and speculation. Jones resigned in disgrace on January 21. Cheves was his natural successor; he briefly considered, but declined, the chance to succeed William Johnson on the U.S. Supreme Court and accepted the presidency on February 15 and was sworn in on March 6.

=== Tenure ===
The day after Cheves took office, the Chief Justice of the U.S. Supreme Court John Marshall delivered his opinion in the case McCulloch v. Maryland, upholding the Bank's exemption from state taxation, harboring the Bank against its political opponents at the state level.

Shortly after he entered office, Cheves also presided over the establishment of a new bank building at Chestnut Street in Philadelphia. The building was completed in 1821.

==== Monetary policies ====
Cheves's early tenure focused on rectifying the failed promises of Jones's administration, enforcing monetary contractions at the branch level by ordering branches in the South and West to stop issuing notes and eastern branches to stop receiving them. He also reduced salaries and opened a correspondence with Secretary of the Treasury William H. Crawford. On April 9, he called a meeting of the board of directors to outline his six proposals, which the board approved overwhelmingly:

- that the curtailment of loans begun by Jones be continued;
- that southern and western offices be forbidden to issue notes whenever such notes would drain the eastern offices of specie;
- that state banks be required to begin immediate specie payments for debts to the Bank;
- that the Treasury give the Bank advance notice when it proposed to withdraw funds from a branch where no government deposits had been made;
- that debentures be paid in the same currency for which they were originally issued; and
- that additional specie be purchased from abroad to secure the Bank's obligations.

Crawford voiced his displeasure at the requirement of Treasury notice. Cheves himself acknowledged that the curtailment of loans was only a temporary measure adopted at the insistence of Bank officers; he determined to lift the restriction as soon as possible. To Crawford, he wrote that the cause of the reforms was "the restraint put upon the offices, with which exchanges were adverse, in the issue of their notes." Circulation dropped about 25 percent. Though his policies likely ensured the Bank's institutional stability, hard money advocate William M. Gouge blamed his restrictions for the continued depression: "The Bank was saved and the people were ruined."

Within Cheves's first six months as president, a movement was instigated to remove him and return to Jones's policy, but it fizzled and he was re-elected unanimously in 1820.

In 1820, drawing on the works of Adam Smith, David Ricardo, Thomas Malthus, and J.B. Say, Cheves anonymously defended his policies (under the pen name "Say") an essay titled Inquiry into the Causes of Public Prosperity and Distress. He argued that war-time prosperity had ended because of the failure of the foreign export market, the "diminution and depreciation of our currency," the "failure of manufacturing establishments," and the resulting "diminished demand for labor and capital." Amid this depression, a "pernicious system of banking" had cheapened the currency and produced "a kind of general paralysis," which his policies had reversed. In time, he predicted, agriculture would be restored, though manufacturing would only grow at the same pace as population in the cities and towns.

In January 1821, in an effort to placate the South and West, Cheves proposed a more lenient loan policy provided it was compatible with maintenance of a sound currency. He was opposed only by Nicholas Biddle. He also established a dividend in July 1821 of 1.5%, which increased to 2.5% by January 1822.

==== Structural reforms ====
Also in 1819, Cheves deputized director Nicholas Biddle to investigate James A. Buchanan, George Williams, and James W. McCulloch for illegally purchasing bank stock worth nearly $3,500,000 and accumulating large and unauthorized personal indebtedness against the Bank. Biddle's investigation revealed fraudulent inflation in the price of the Bank's stock and personal enrichment by all three men. McCulloch was removed as cashier and Buchanan resigned as president.

In 1820, subordinate officers in Richmond and Philadelphia were forced to resigned for misconduct and unreported deficiencies. Cheves called for investigations into the business policies of western branches and legal protections for the Bank by Congress amending the charter:

- the term of Bank directors to be extended to more than three years;
- legal protection for the Bank against frauds committed by its own officers;
- officials other than the President and cashier deputized to sign bank notes; and
- branches required by charter to accept only their own notes or those of the parent bank in Philadelphia.

These calls were unsuccessful; no Congressional majority could be gained to side with Cheves during his presidency.

=== Resignation and succession ===
As early as 1821, Cheves had resolved to retire from his post by January 1823. He made his decision known to Secretary Crawford in May 1822 and announced it at the stockholders meeting on October 1, after which a struggle to succeed him ensued. Cheves first fended off a challenge by Jones supporters who sought to reverse his policies; the board he nominated was elected unanimously.

Among the Cheves supporters, Secretary Crawford solicited Albert Gallatin, but received little approval from the directors. Roswell L. Colt lobbied for his nephew, Nicholas Biddle. Biddle was also a friend of President Monroe. Robert Gilmor Jr. advised Cheves that Biddle was "unsuitable." Cheves adamantly preferred a Philadelphian, but disliked Biddle as pretentious for his opposition to his liberalization policies. Baltimore directors lobbied heavily for a resident of that city, but were split between Thomas Ellicott and John White, who had succeeded McCulloch as branch cashier, and were unable to overcome Cheves's preference for a Philadelphian. Cheves ultimately settled William M. Meredith but, fearing Meredith was unqualified, asked White to accept the role of cashier to act as de facto President. White rejected this plan.

Meanwhile, Biddle began to actively campaign for the position. Emphasizing support from Crawford and Monroe, he openly expressed his willingness to serve. He gained support from John Quincy Adams, John C. Calhoun, Stephen Girard, and powerful Philadelphia stockholders. In November, Cheves publicly supported Biddle as his successor and he was voted in 14–1. (Note: The lone vote against was Samuel W. Dana of Connecticut.)

== Retirement ==
After leaving the Bank, Cheves remained in Philadelphia until 1826, when he moved his family to Lancaster, Pennsylvania. He returned his family to South Carolina in 1830 to become rice planters and continued to engage in public debate, writing occasional essays and reviews. He was a leading advocate for the idea of a unified Southern resistance to national government, particularly in opposition to tariffs and the abolition of slavery.

In 1823, he was appointed to adjust American claims under the St. Petersburg Convention. Most of the disputed claims concerned slaves seized by the British navy from southern plantations, and Cheves was chosen by Southern Congressmen as a sympathetic pro-slavery voice. After a series of delays and disagreements, the British agreed to pay a lump sum for the seized slaves, which would be distributed to American slaveowners by a commission consisting of Cheves, Henry Seawell, and James Pleasants. During their adjudication, Cheves argued against admitting the testimony of the slaves themselves, but Congress intervened against him to side with Seawall and Pleasants. He resigned the commission early after approving two claims.

In 1823–1824, Cheves was asked to re-enter the political arena as a Democratic-Republican Party candidate for the office of U.S. President in time for the 1824 election; he turned this offer down. In 1828, he endorsed Andrew Jackson over his friend Henry Clay and John Quincy Adams. Jackson considered Cheves for Secretary of the Treasury, but he was passed over in favor of Samuel D. Ingham.

=== Nullification and secession ===
During the nullification crisis of 1828–33, Cheves urged tariff reduction, as did most members of the South Carolina planter class. In contrast to many of his allies, however, Cheves spoke highly of regional union in opposition to "the metaphysics of nullification" as a distinctly South Carolinian issue. He framed the issue as "a great Southern question, in which South Carolina is not more interested than the rest of the Southern States" and therefore urged the formation of a convention of States to present a unified front of resistance and pressure Congress into tariff reduction. He also recalled the failure of Georgia in resistance to the Supreme Court decision Worcester v. Georgia. His compromise position was not popular with either the outright Nullifier or Unionist factions. Cheves decried both factions as divisive and the popular rancor over the issue a betrayal of representative constitutional democracy.

Cheves stayed aloof from the intrastate conflict over the crisis until 1832, when he joined the Unionists after they adopted his call for a convention of Southern states and were successful in reducing the tariff, over the Nullifiers' objections. Cheves directly countered Calhoun, now Vice President of the United States, arguing that "[t]here is not a shadow of support for the doctrine of Constitutional Nullification... in the Constitution of the United States." He did nonetheless decline to directly join the Unionist campaign and refused election as a delegate from Sumter County to the Unionist state convention.

In 1837, he opposed a recharter of the National Bank, arguing that excessive centralization threatened to snap the taut binds between the States:

"Those who wish the Union to last, should not desire to make the Government stronger. The cord is one which will not bear stretching; you may multiply its strands but you will destroy the material. Touch it with power and it will snap like a thread."

In 1844, amid renewed calls for nullification over the Tariff of 1842, Cheves emphatically revived his prior position, calling for no action by South Carolina without the backing of the entire South. This time, he added that such action was also necessary to defend slavery, without which the South would become "blackened ruins, with a remanent of the African race wandering amidst them in all the mistery of desolation and hopelessness." Throughout the following decade, Cheves's idea of unified Southern action became increasingly popular, leading to a series of informal commercial and political conventions throughout the region.

In the summer and autumn of 1850, Cheves served as a delegate to the Nashville Convention, which adopted resolutions denouncing the Compromise of 1850. In the convention's second, more radical session, Cheves took a leading role by personally offering and advocating for a resolution that "secession by the joint action of the slave-holding States is the only efficient remedy for the aggravated wrongs which they now endure and the enormous evils which threaten them in future, from the usurped and unrestrained power of the federal government."

At the state convention of 1852, Cheves worked to prevent South Carolina from seceding unilaterally, maintaining his belief in Southern unity.

=== Planting and real estate ===
Cheves's plantation, called Delta, made heavy use of slave labor; when his daughter was married in late 1830, Cheves gifted her forty-one slaves and three house servants. The total number of slaves held on the plantation throughout his management varied around 200. Cheves frequently replaced his plantation's overseers through his eleven years as its manager, finding that they were inadequate "manager[s] of Negroes." He employed lashings but refused to employ methods of punishment that he believed would "extend so far as to endanger life and health." In 1835, he inherited a second plantation focused on cotton production, which he named Lang Syne, and an additional 94 slaves. A third plantation, Southfield, was established for his youngest son Hayne in 1845.

== Personal life ==
=== Family ===
Cheves met his wife, Mary Elizabeth Dulles, on a return trip from Montréal. She was a young Charleston resident at boarding school in Philadelphia, rooming with Cheves's law partner's sister-in-law. Cheves's party agreed to escort the two girls home to Charleston. They were engaged to be married by December 1805.

They were married on May 6, 1806, at the Dulles home in Charleston. The couple had fourteen children including proslavery essayist Louisa McCord. Their eldest son, Joseph, attended Yale before transferring to Harvard, where he was a member of the Porcellian Club. Joseph graduated in 1826 and read law in New York City. Alexander Cheves attended the United States Military Academy at West Point before studying and practicing law in Baltimore. He later succumbed to alcoholism and became estranged from his father.

Mary died on April 5, 1836, at the age of forty-six.

=== Religion ===
Cheves was a lifelong Presbyterian.

=== Civic organizations ===
In 1814, he was elected a member of the American Antiquarian Society. In 1821, Cheves was elected as a member of the American Philosophical Society and Mercantile Library Association in Philadelphia.

=== Views on evolution ===
Like many wealthy men of his day, Cheves was interested in science. The physician and geologist Joseph Le Conte was an acquaintance. In his autobiography, Le Conte wrote that Cheves had articulated to him a theory of evolution almost identical to Charles Darwin's, long before Darwin published his Origin of Species. However, Cheves never published his ideas on the subject.

== Death and burial ==
After the death of his son-in-law David McCord and son Charles in 1855, Cheves suffered a stroke which left him partially paralyzed. He moved to Columbia, South Carolina with his daughter Louisa, and lived there until his death on June 26, 1857.

He was laid in state in Charleston City Hall and was buried at the Scots Presbyterian Church.

== See also ==
- Abbeville (Lancaster, Pennsylvania), which was owned by Cheves between 1826 and 1830
- Lang Syne Plantation, the family plantation

== Notes ==
Legal offices
Preceded by John Pringle	Attorney General of South Carolina; 1808–1810	Succeeded by John Richardson
U.S. House of Representatives
Preceded by Robert Marion	Member of the U.S. House of Representatives from South Carolina's 1st congressional district 1810–1815	Succeeded by Henry Middleton
Preceded by Ezekiel Bacon	Chair of the House Ways and Means Committee; 1812–1813	Succeeded by John Eppes
Political offices
Preceded by Henry Clay	Speaker of the United States House of Representatives; 1814–1815	Succeeded by Henry Clay
Government offices
Preceded by James Fisher; Acting	President of the Second Bank of the United States; 1819–1823	Succeeded by Nicholas Biddle
