= Rebecca Screven House =

House in United States of America

Coordinates: 32.77379°N 79.93433°W

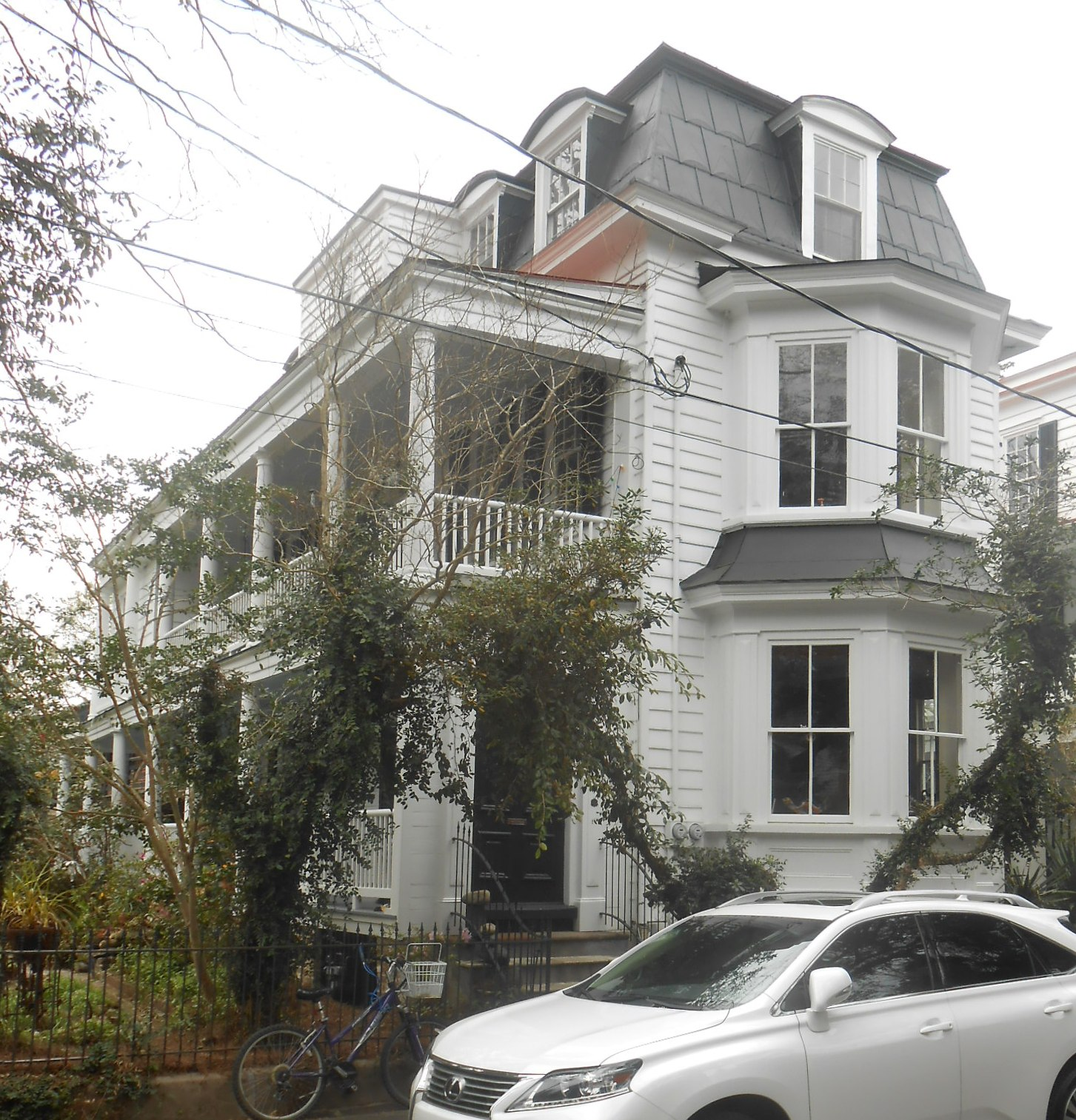
The Rebecca Screven House was built at 35 Legare Street, Charleston, South Carolina.

The Rebecca Screven House in Charleston, South Carolina is a Charleston single house built sometime before 1828 at 35 Legare Street.

== History ==
Rebecca Screven built the house on property she inherited from her mother, Mrs. Elizabeth Williams. In 1879, the house was bought by Louisa J. McCord. Louisa McCord was one of the most prominent women writers in antebellum South Carolina.

In April 2014, the Historic Charleston Foundation bought the house through its revolving fund, a pool of money the foundation uses to acquire historic properties before reselling them to preservation-minded buyers subject to preservation easements. The foundation paid $1.75 million for the house, performed some work on the building, and listed it for resale in May 2014 through a competitive bid process. Both the interior and exterior of the house will be protected by easements, as will a garden designed by Loutrel Briggs.

It remains private.
