= McCord House =

Historic house in South Carolina, United States

- U.S. National Register of Historic Places
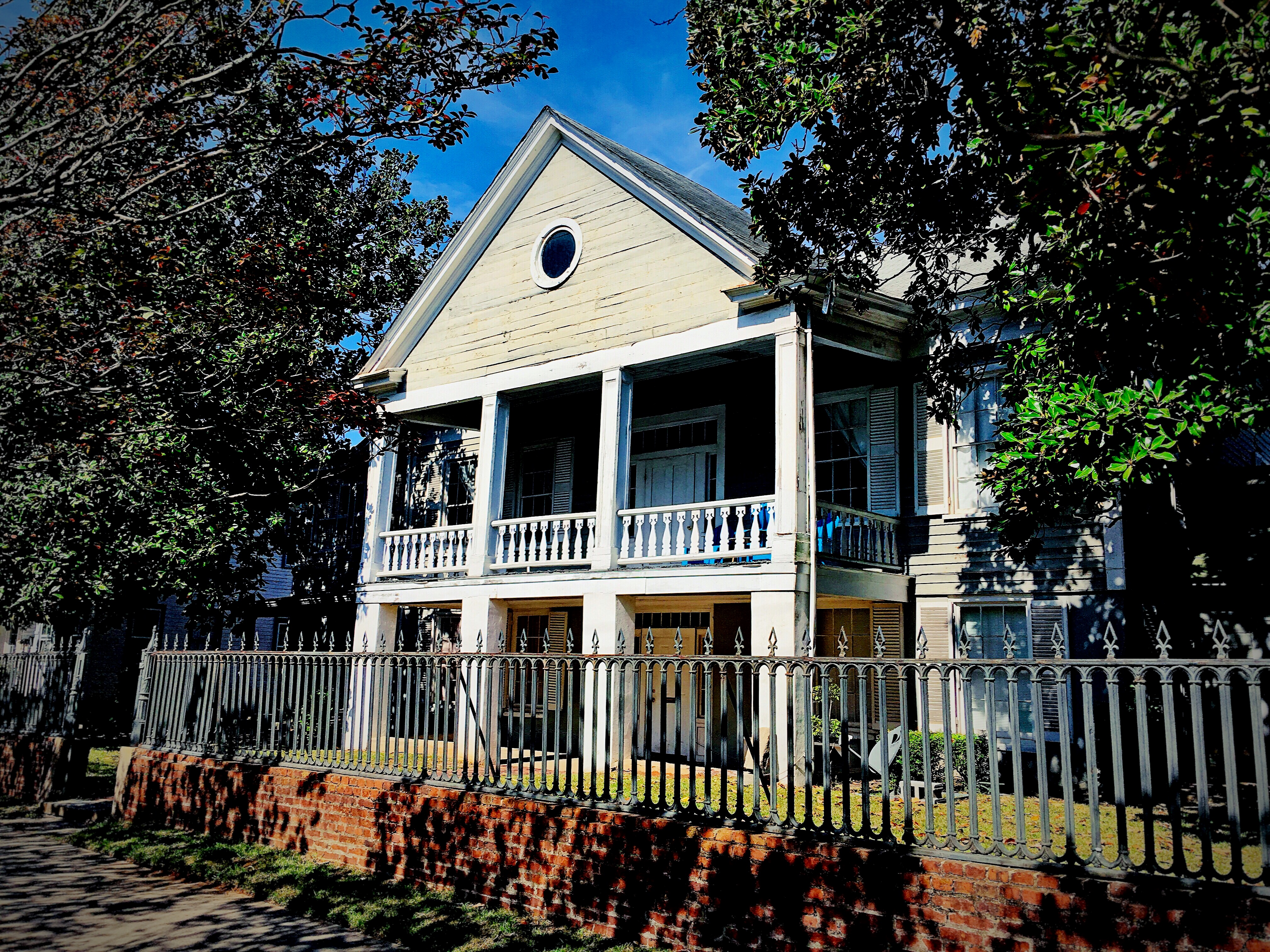

- Location within South Carolina Location within the United States
- Location: 1431 Pendleton St., Columbia, South Carolina
- Coordinates: 33°59′59″N 81°1′41″W
- Area: 0.2 acres (0.081 ha)
- Built: 1849
- Architectural style: Greek Revival
- MPS: Columbia MRA
- NRHP reference No.: 79003357
- Added to NRHP: March 2, 1979

McCord House, also known as the McCord-Oxner House, is a historic home in Columbia, South Carolina. It was built in 1849, and is a 1½-story clapboard Greek Revival style cottage, with additions made in the 1850s. It sits on a stucco raised basement. The front facade features a one-story portico supported by four stucco piers. It was built by David James McCord (1797–1855), a planter, lawyer, and editor, and his wife Louisa Susannah Cheves McCord, a noted author of political and economic essays, poetry, and drama. In 1865, the McCord House became the headquarters of General Oliver O. Howard, who was General William Tecumseh Sherman’s second in command. It was added to the National Register of Historic Places in 1979. The house is currently owned by Henry McMaster, the incumbent Governor of South Carolina, who purchased the property in May 2016.
