= Louisa S. McCord =

American writer, political essayist

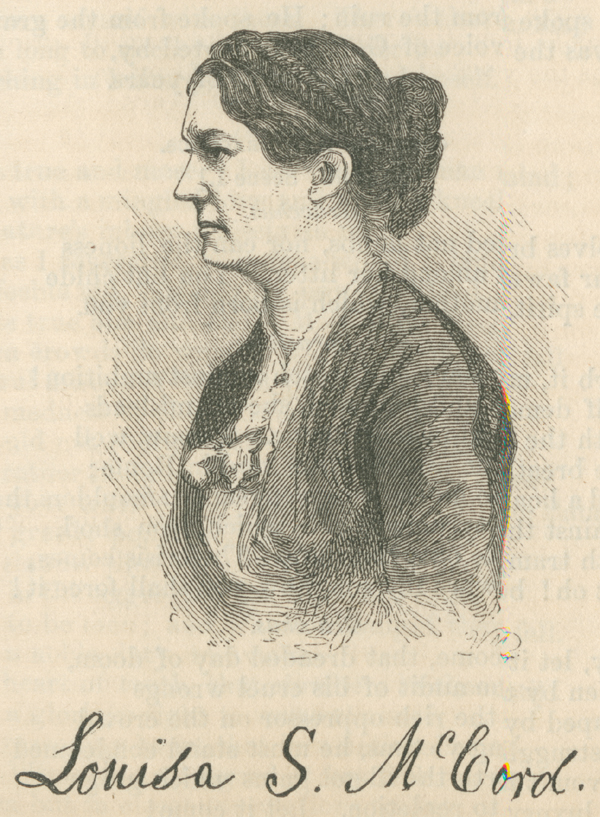
- From the Cyclopaedia of American Literature (1855)
- Born: Louisa Susannah Cheves; December 3, 1810; Charleston, South Carolina, U.S.
- Died: November 23, 1879 (aged 68); Charleston, South Carolina, U.S.
- Resting place: Magnolia Cemetery, Charleston
- Occupations: Writer; translator
- Spouse: David James McCord (m. 1840)
- Relatives: Langdon Cheves (father)
- Writing career
- Period: 1840s – post American Civil War
- Genre: Political essays
- Subject: Free trade

Louisa Susannah Cheves McCord (December 3, 1810 – November 23, 1879) was an American plantation owner and author from South Carolina, best known as a political essayist who wrote on free trade. Between 1848 and 1856, she authored some thirteen essays and a play, Caius Gracchus, appeared in print, in which McCord articulated a defense of slavery as well as a conservative view of women's place in society.

The daughter of Langdon Cheves, she was born in 1810 in South Carolina and educated in Philadelphia. In 1840, she married David James McCord, becoming a widow in 1855. She mainly resided in Columbia, South Carolina.

McCord was active as an author from the 1840s onward, and her production is regarded as an important contribution to Southern literature of the Antebellum era. McCord's writings consisted principally of essays and reviews, and she wrote well on the subject of political economy. Her published volumes included, My Dreams, a volume of poems published in Philadelphia in 1848; Sophisms of the Protective Policy. A translation from the French of Bastiat, published in New York in 1848; and Caius Gracchus. A five-act tragedy, published in New York in 1851. McCord was a contributor to the Southern Quarterly Review and the Southern Literary Messenger beginning in 1849. Henry Timrod, Paul Hamilton Hayne, William Gilmore Simms, William Henry Trescot, Requier and James Matthews Legaré were her contemporaries; some were personal friends.

== Early years and education ==
Louisa Susannah Cheves was born December 3, 1810 in Charleston to Langdon Cheves and his wife, Mary Elizabeth Dulles.

Her paternal grandfather, Alexander Cheves, came from Aberdeen, Scotland, to the United States in the latter half of the 18th century. He married Mary Langdon, a daughter of Dr. Thomas Langdon of Virginia. They settled in the frontier country of South Carolina in what later became Abbeville County. Here, during a Native American raid on September 17, 1776, in a blockhouse where the people had taken refuge from the Native Americans, Langdon Cheves was born, the father of Louisa McCord. Her maternal grandfather, Joseph Dulles, a native of Dublin, came to the U.S. during the same period in which Alexander Cheves had come. He married Sophia, the daughter of Colonel William Heatley of St. Matthew's parish, South Carolina, and his wife, Maria Louisa Courtonne, the daughter of a Huguenot pastor. Their daughter, Mary Elizabeth, became the wife of Langdon Cheves. Of this union, Louisa was the first-born.

The early years of Louisa Cheves' life were closely influenced by her father's interests and surroundings. In October 1810 (the year of her birth), Langdon Cheves was elected from the Charleston Congressional District to Congress, where he took his seat in session with Lowndes, Williams and Calhoun, forming an integral factor of that group of Southern statesmen whose opinions express a distinct school of political purpose and constitutional interpretation in U.S. history. In 1814, Clay was appointed to the Ghent Commission and in the vacancy created by his absence, Cheves was made Speaker of the United States House of Representatives, a position he held until 1816. From 1816 to 1819, he was Judge of the South Carolina Circuit Court. During these years, Louisa was a little child. When she was nine years old, Langdon Cheves was called to adjust the financial difficulties of the United States Bank at Philadelphia.

At this time, his two daughters, Louisa and Sophia, the latter of whom became Mrs. Charles Thompson Haskell, were sent to the school of a Mr. Grimshaw, an Irishman then living in Philadelphia. Later the sisters were placed under the care of Mr. and Mrs. Picot, French refugees with whom they continued to study for several years, becoming thoroughly conversant with the French language. Subsequently, the girls were introduced to Washington and Philadelphia society. It had not been her father's intention to educate his daughters in any other way than that usually given women in that day—a lighter academic course, with a "finishing school" for French, astronomy, and so forth. The graces of education were stressed rather than fundamentals. But Louisa early developed a passion for mathematics, and stated that a girl with such a love of knowledge should have every opportunity to perfect herself not only in mathematics, but also in other branches of study not then usually undertaken by women. She was then given just the same mathematical instruction that her brothers received. In this her education was unusual. In her father's study and at his table she met and heard the discourse of men whose speech expressed national policies, whose style, both in written and in spoken English, is classic. Her father's contemporaries were Webster, Calhoun, Clay and their associates. Political economy was the gospel of their theories. The young girl, hearing them express their theories, learned to think deeply on political issues. Her father's secession theory influenced Louisa and largely determined her mature writing.

During a part of this period, the Cheves family lived in "Abbeville," outside of Lancaster, Pennsylvania. After a residence here of about eight years, the family then retired to South Carolina.

== Lang Syne plantation ==
As a young woman, Louisa Cheves came into the possession of Lang Syne Plantation, formerly belonging to a great-aunt, Mrs. Lovell, a daughter of Colonel William Heatley. "Lang Syne" was in St. Matthew's parish, on the Congaree River near Fort Motte, South Carolina, about 30 miles (48 km) from Columbia.

In May 1840, she married David James McCord of Columbia, South Carolina, a prominent lawyer, public speaker, writer/editor of the "Statutes at large of South Carolina", and a frequent contributor to the Southern Quarterly Review, writing on Free Trade. David McCord died in 1855.

== Writer ==
=== Poetry ===
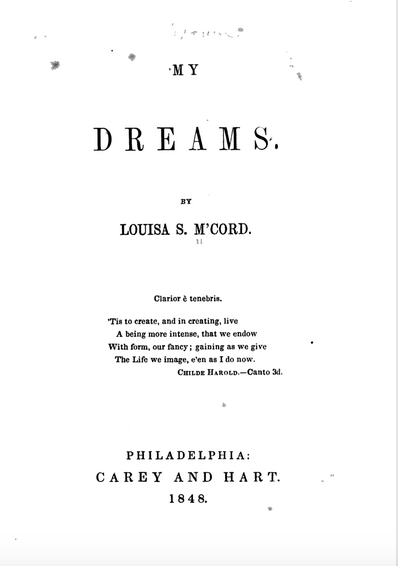
My Dreams

In the year 1848, McCord published her first book of poetry, My Dreams, a collection of fugitive poems from the press of Carey & Hart, Philadelphia. A close study of these poems reveals a genuine poetic talent, but there is not the certainty of maturity, nor the metrical perfection of first-rate poetry. The lyrist is an honestly doubting lyrist in many passages. There are a number of them that are either of adolescent composition, withheld until 1848 for publication, or at least of adolescent conception, possibly worked over for this volume. Hope is the keynote of a majority of the poems in this collection; but in many instances the hope is unaccompanied by any certainty of faith, such as a woman of McCord's full life and wide experience must have developed at the time this collection was published. A few of the poems are narrative myths, a direct reflection of her classic temperament. They suggest early Greek myths, and meet the reader with such titles as "The Daughters of Hope," who are cleverly personified as Fancy and Happiness; Happiness being lost in Life's confusion, Fancy assists her mother, Hope, to chase Happiness through all time. Other poems include "The Falling Star," "Love, Wisdom, Folly," "The Comet," "The Star That Followed Me," "Conduct of the Sources of Good and Evil," "The Home of Hope" and "The Voice of a Star." Then there is a grouping possible among them of simple narratives of the world of concrete things. For example, the pathetic "Poor Nannie" and "The Blood Stained Rose," "The Birth of the Evergreens" and "Pretty Fanny." But it is in the third division of these poems that McCord's maturity expresses her feelings, and in the poems of this group deals with the eternal riddle of life and death. They suggest the suffering spirit. "My Dream Child," "The Village Churchyard," "The First Beam of Light," "My Dead," "Ye're Born to Die" and others are found here.

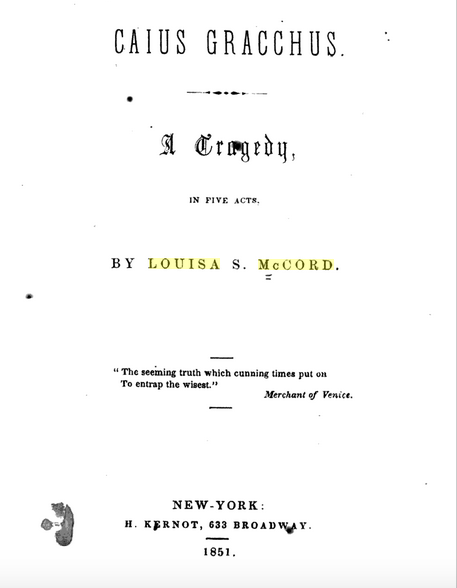
Caius Gracchus

It was not until three years later, in 1851, that McCord essayed a longer poetic effort in Caius Gracchus, a tragedy in five acts. This showed a maturity and a greater care in preparation. The main source of the plot is the story of the Gracchi, which McCord follows rather closely. The play was probably never intended for the stage; it belongs to that class of classic closet dramas that were in vogue in the first half of the 19th century. The character interpretation is probably the strongest and most valuable part of the work. Caius is heroic and his young wife is as winsome as a Roman girl could well be; the mob in its vacillations is accurately drawn, and Cornelia is a masterpiece. The probability is that the real Cornelia was a favorite heroine of McCord's. Their lives bear similarities in biography; they were called upon to make supreme sacrifices that were identical, and they endured with similar silent heroism.

=== Prose ===
From 1849, she was a contributor to The Southern Quarterly Review, The Southern Literary Messenger, and De Bow's Review. Among her most prominent essays were "Justice and Fraternity," "The Right to Labor," "Diversity of the Races, its bearing upon Negro Slavery," "Negro and White Slavery," "Enfranchisement of Women," "Uncle Tom's Cabin," " Carey on the Slave-trade," "Negro Mania," "Woman and her Needs," "British Philanthropy and American Slavery," "Charity which does not Begin at Home," and "A Letter to the Duchess of Sutherland from a Lady of South Carolina." Davidson said that McCord was a contributor to the Southern Literary Messenger, but examination of the complete files of the Southern Literary Messenger does not show her name. This is no negative proof, however. There are numerous anonymous articles, a few of which suggest McCord's style. A few poems are very similar to some selections found in My Dreams, but because there is no signature her authorship cannot be assumed. In the editorial reminiscences secured and edited by Benjamin Blake Minor, one-time editor of the Messenger, McCord's name is not mentioned. The same problem is faced in a review of De Bow's Review; her signature cannot be found, nor is her name acknowledged by J. D. B. De Bow in his quarterly Table of Contents. However, the Table of Contents of DeBow's Review lists only the signed articles; there are numerous unsigned ones. So, accepting the statements of Duyckinck and Davidson, who agree that McCord contributed to these magazines, the assumption is made that she worked anonymously for these magazines. Women authors often disguised their names under masculine noms de plume. However, most of her contributions to the Southern Quarterly Review were signed, and were easily available.

McCord was most widely known as a political essayist. She published numerous essays in Southern papers, normally about political issues. Her views were conservative, Southern, pro-slavery, and idealizing of Southern society. She was one of the few women who wrote on the subject of political economy. In 1848, George P. Putnam, of New York, published her Translation of Bastiat's Sophisms of the Protective Policy, with an introductory letter by Dr. Francis Lieber, professor of political philosophy and economy in South Carolina College. Her contributions on this subject to the Southern Quarterly Review included "Justice and Fraternity" in July 1849; "The Right to Labour" in October 1849; and "Diversity of Races, its Bearing upon Negro Slavery" in April 1851.

McCord’s advocacy for slavery often rested on discussions of political economy. In an extended response to an 1856 essay by George Frederick Holmes, in which he conceded that free labor was often cheaper than slave labor, McCord asserted that the logic and evidence of political economy established the opposite. “[T]he true principles of Political Economy … carried the day for slavery,” she wrote, and that “slavery, which is the negro’s protection, is the world’s wealth.” To support her claims, she quoted from Parliamentary debates, speeches, and the work of European economists. She dismissed moral arguments against slavery as “sickly sentimentality” and unscientific.

=== Literary work ===
McCord's literary work set forth the political doctrines of lassez faire and self-determination. Her interest in political and sociological questions was broad. She knew past history, was attuned to current events, and she perceived the tendencies of humanity. She was, above all else, the votary of political economy. Her style was polemical, at times satirical, always coherent and clear. She was virile, intense, at once possessing the force of a statesman's thinking together with the versatility of wit. As pure literature, these magazine articles did not have a place. As attainments of what they set out to do, they were successful. In every instance, she was on familiar ground; she knew more of the subject than she expressed. She expressed the convictions and reasonings of then-contemporary thinkers of her section ably. The writers who cut the fresh pages of the Southern Quarterly Review at that time read with relish McCord's convincing and cleverly arranged arguments in support of their position.

She advocated State sovereignty, favoring secession and a political confederation founded upon a community of interests. Her vision was of a great Southern confederacy in which the culture of classical learning would continue to flourish, in which an economic independence would be maintained through the cotton industry, in which the Afro-American would be most comfortable and happy in a state of slavery, and in which the white master, with his labor question settled, would be furnished the leisure requisite for the pursuit of science and art.

== Activist ==
=== Women's suffrage ===
Another popular topic of her day on which McCord commented was the question of woman's suffrage. The Westminster Review for July 1851 had contained some articles on equal suffrage. The third session of the Women's Rights Convention had been held at Worcester, Massachusetts, on October 15, 1851. McCord's essay was based largely on the Westminster Review article and on the proceedings of the convention. She said that public service in affairs of state is by its nature masculine, and that the men of the race are naturally and harmoniously at home in the discharge of this service; "woman is neither man's superior, equal, nor inferior; she is his different". She went on to say, "Woman will reach the greatest height of which she is capable —the greatest, perhaps, of which humanity is capable— not by becoming man, but by becoming more than ever woman." These phrases were the expression of the conviction of the old South.

In discussing the Woman's Rights movement, she replied to a proposition of an English review, that "a reason must be given why anything should be permitted to one person and interdicted to another." "A reason —a reason why man cannot drink fire and breathe water! A scientific answer about hydrogen and oxygen will not answer the purpose. These are facts, not reasons. Why? Why? Why is anything on God's earth what it is? Can Miss Martineau tell? We cannot. God has made it so, and reason, instinct and experience teach us its uses. Woman, Nature teaches you yours."

=== Support for the Confederacy ===
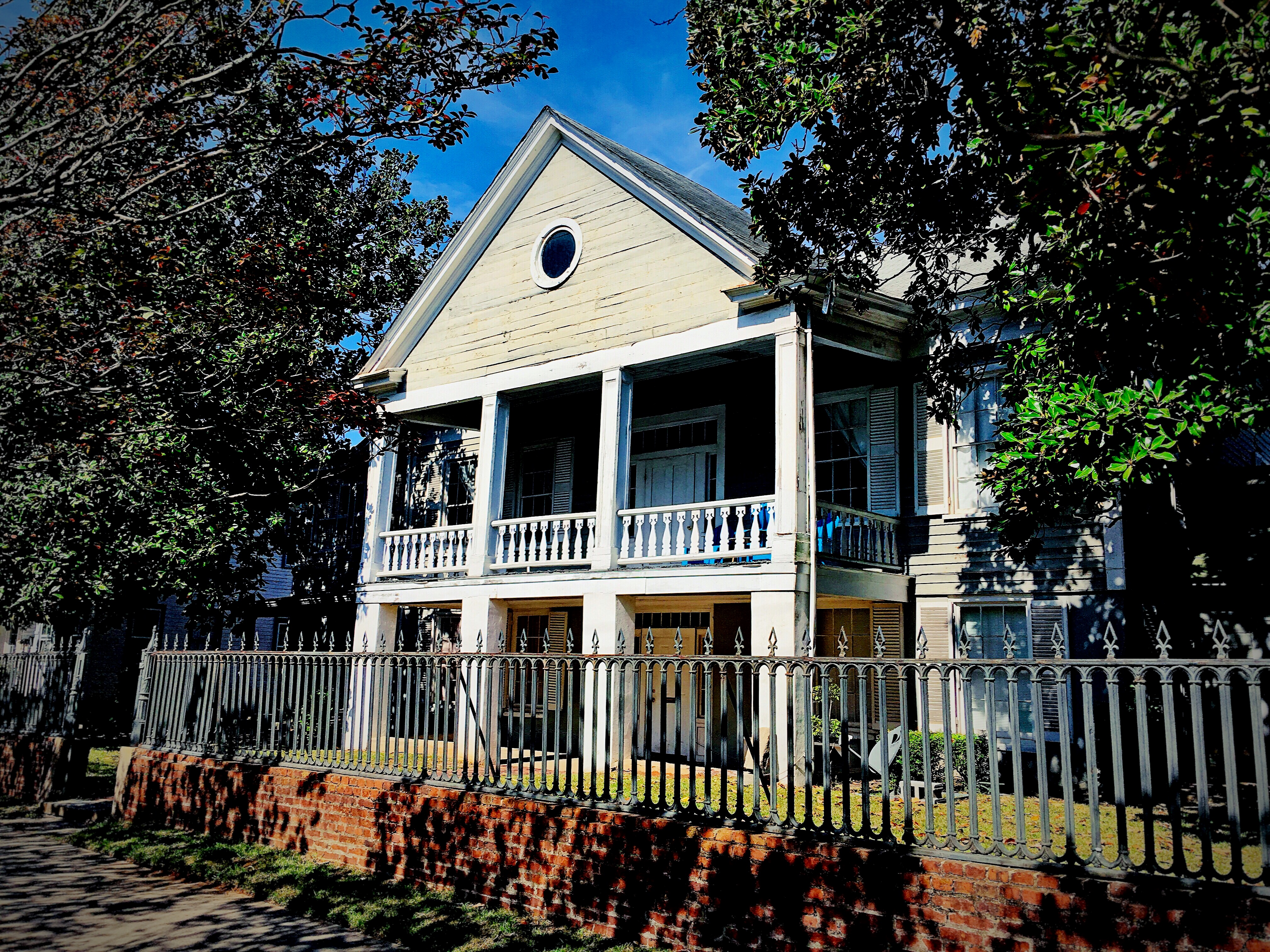
Front elevation of the McCord House, built 1849

Early in the summer of 1861, the Soldiers' Relief Association was organized, with McCord as president. In July 1861, she was made president of the Ladies' Clothing Association. The first-named organization made the uniforms for the company of her son, Captain L. Cheves McCord, his mother furnishing the material. In 1862, she resigned her presidency of the Soldiers' Relief Association in order to give her whole time to the military hospital established within the South Carolina College, and here she gave her greatest service. In her home, at the northwest corner of Pendleton and Bull streets, across the street from the college property, she received supplies from the women of the city—supplies available for nourishment for the sick and hospital comfort. Early every day, a supply of corn bread and broth was made in her kitchen, heaped into plates and left on a long dresser on her back piazza, served day after day as nourishment for wounded soldiers who could drag themselves across the street from the convalescent building on the campus.

All her carpets were cut into blankets. All wool mattresses were ripped up and their contents spun into yarn for soldiers' socks. Even the hair of rabbits killed on the plantation was saved, and, when combined with a little wool and the ravelings of old black silk scraps, made a gray yarn, from which officers' gloves were knitted. All of the lead from her houses—even the lead pipes from an elaborate system of waterworks on her plantation—was sent to be melted into bullets. Before the end of the war, all her horses had gone into the army.

In the midst of all this activity there came from Second Manassas the news that her son, Cheves McCord, had died. On the morning of February 17, 1865, McCord was warned about the invasion of her city. During the occupation of the city by Sherman, McCord remained in her own home, though the house—such part as was not reserved for her use—was occupied by General Howard and his staff as headquarters. When General Howard left, a guard was set before the premises "to protect it" and promptly set to work pillaging the house, though a young officer gave some protection. Her two daughters had been sent by her to the hospital, previous to Sherman's entrance to the town, in the hope of greater protection for them during the turmoil under the hospital's flag. McCord lived long enough to see reconstruction and when, in 1869, the suggestion was made that a monument be erected to the Confederate soldier, it was to McCord that the women of the State at once turned for leadership. She was made the first president of the association, and in this capacity, she organized the first efforts of Columbia women to perpetuate the memory of the Confederate soldier.

== Later years ==
After the war, McCord left South Carolina for a time, going to Charlottesville, Virginia, and thence further to Canada—to Coburg and other points. But finding that she could not remain away from South Carolina, she returned, and, though embittered by it, took the oath of allegiance that she might have the disposal of her own property. The latter years of McCord's life were spent in Charleston, in the home of her son-in-law, Major Augustine T. Smythe, and his wife, her daughter Louisa.

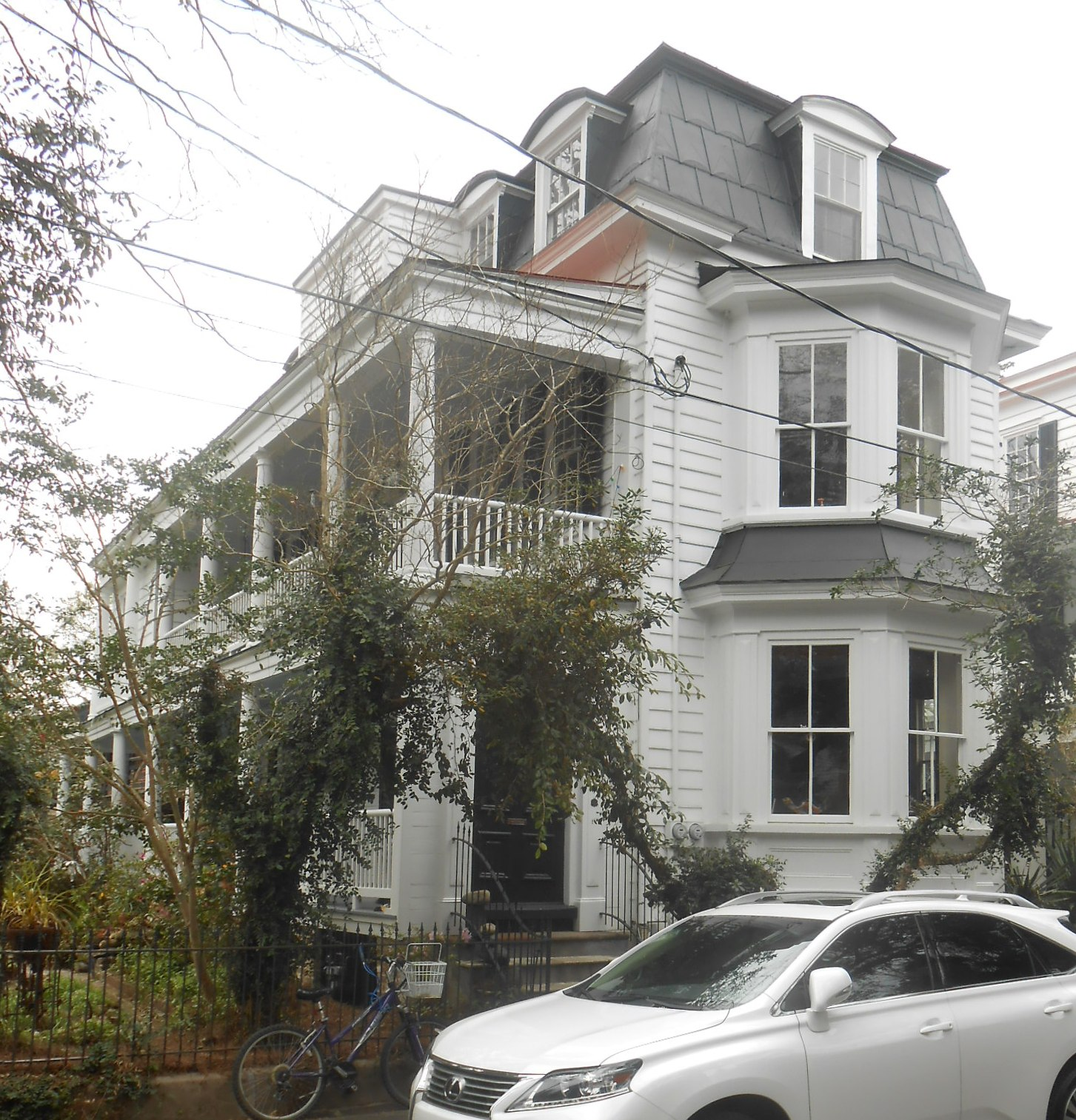
McCord purchased the Rebecca Screven House in 1879.

In the spring of 1879, the unveiling of the Confederate monument took place at Columbia, her little granddaughter, Cheves McCord, actively participating in the ceremony. On November 23, 1879, after a brief illness at her home in Charleston, she died and was buried in Magnolia Cemetery.
