= Abbeyville =

Abbeyville may refer to:

- Abbeyville, Colorado, US, an unincorporated community
- Abbeyville, Ohio, US, an unincorporated community

== See also ==
- Abbyville, Kansas
- Abbeville (disambiguation)
