= Beard Congregational Church =

Historic church in Louisiana, United States

- U.S. National Register of Historic Places
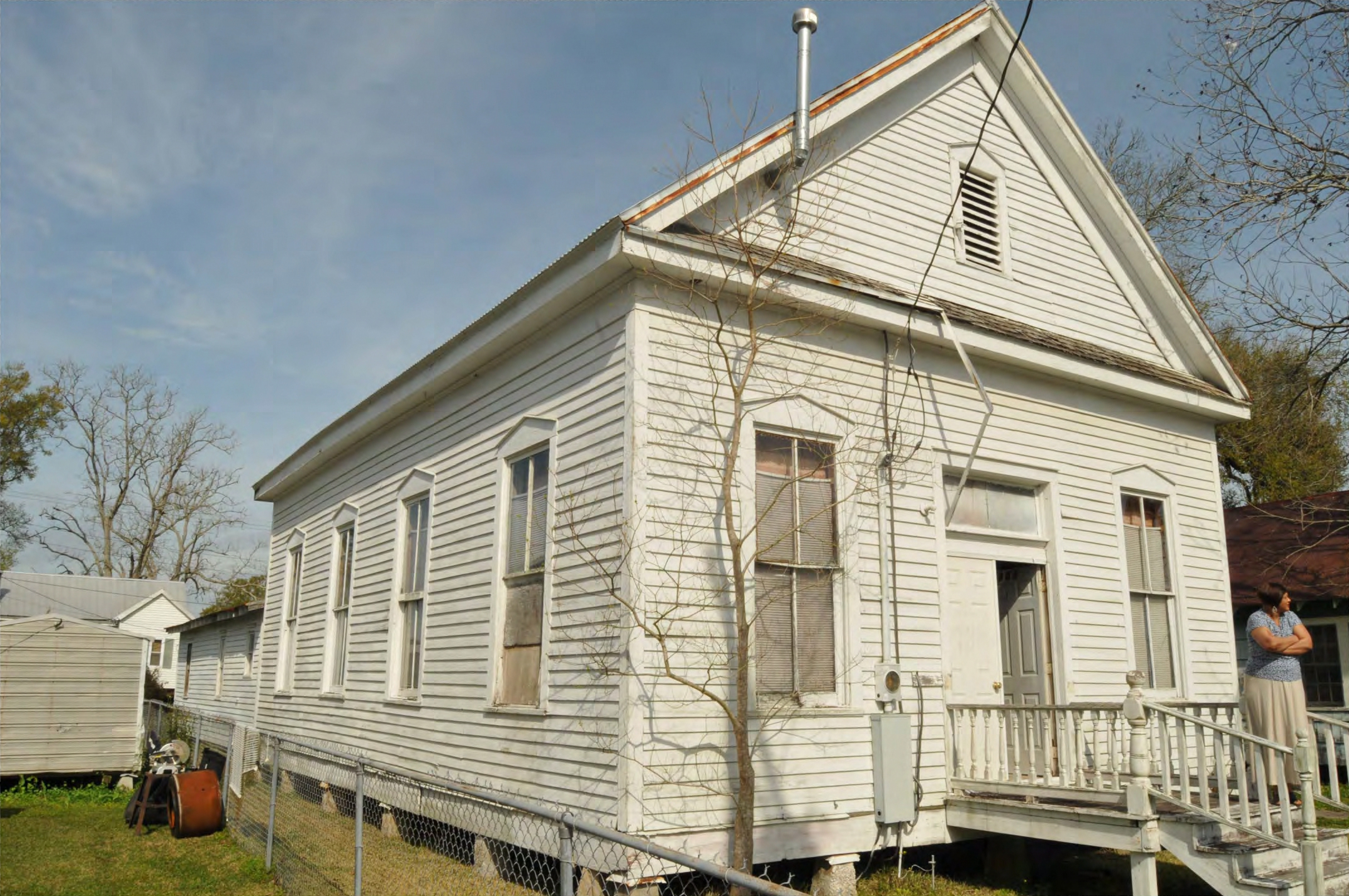

- Location within Louisiana
- Location: 402 Granger St., Erath, Louisiana
- Coordinates: 29°57′22″N 92°02′16″W
- Area: less than one acre
- NRHP reference No.: 15000700
- Added to NRHP: October 5, 2015

The Beard Congregational Church, at 402 Granger St. in Erath, Louisiana was listed on the National Register of Historic Places in 2015.

It is a simple frame country church built in 1916. It also served as a school for African American children.
