= Dr. Joseph Angel Villien House =

Historic house in Louisiana, United States

- U.S. National Register of Historic Places
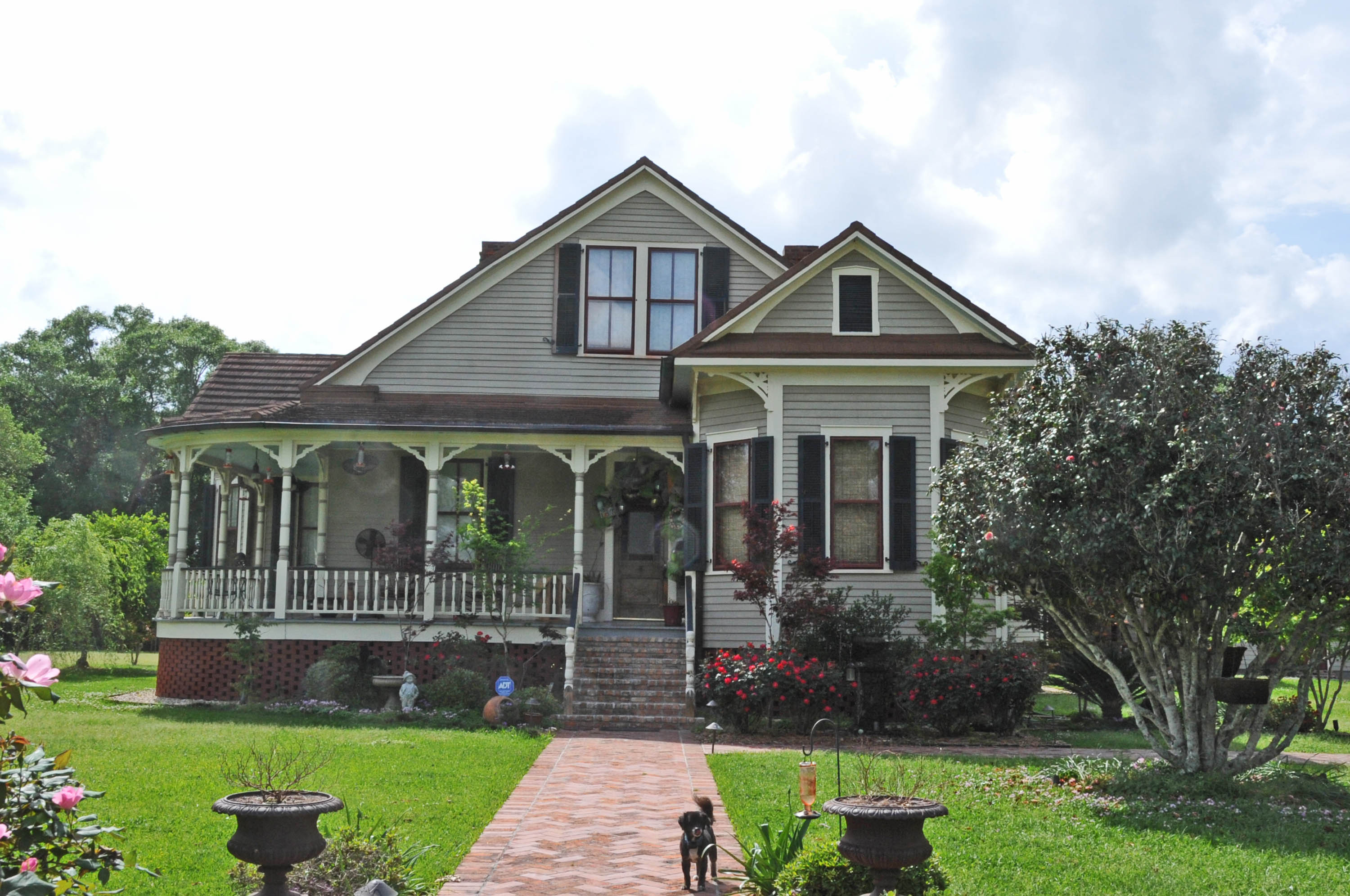

- Location within Louisiana Location within the United States
- Location: 200 W. Joseph St., Maurice, Louisiana
- Coordinates: 30°6′22″N 92°7′41″W
- Area: 8.7 acres (3.5 ha)
- Built: 1895
- Architectural style: Queen Anne
- NRHP reference No.: 01000806
- Added to NRHP: August 2, 2001

The Dr. Joseph Angel Villien House, located at 200 W. Joseph St. in Maurice in Vermilion Parish, Louisiana, is a Queen Anne-style house built in 1895. It was listed on the National Register of Historic Places in 2001.

The listing included seven contributing buildings: the house, "a large mule barn, a potato shed, a 'helper's house' (perhaps built before the main house was started and where a hired man later lived), a privy, a small building where power (presumably carbide gas) for the main house's lights was generated, and a second large barn." The six smaller buildings are wooden, mostly board and batten, with metal roofs.
