= Abbeville, Tipperary =

Country house in County Tipperary, Ireland

Coordinates: 53.08212°N 8.06567°W

Abbeville is a small country house in the townland of Abbeville in County Tipperary in Ireland. It is set in relict parkland.

It is a three-bay, three-storey house with one-storey flanking wing walls to either side, built c. 1840, and with an earlier, possibly 17th century, three-bay, three-storey rear wing. The fenestration of the main front is composed of tripartite windows with carved pilasters, except for the central bay, where there are double round-headed windows over the doorcase. The front door is flanked by clustered columns and has a cobweb fanlight above. The datestone "1773" does not seem to relate to any part of the present building, but may indicate a previous phase of building activity. There are a number of limestone outbuildings to the south-east including one range with segmental and depressed-arch carriage arches.

Abbeville was the seat of the Hemsworth family from the early 18th century until c.1890, when Thomas Gerard Hemsworth sold up and emigrated to Canada. Some land was sold to the Dawson family through the Encumbered Estates Court c.1850, but the Hemsworths still had 387 acres (1.6 km^{2}) in c.1870. The Killeens bought the entire estate from the Hemsworths in about c.1900. The house is still owned by the Killeen family. The park retains the remains of a canal to the north.

The property is listed on North Tipperary County Council's Record of Protected Structures.
