= Bank of Gueydan =

- U.S. National Register of Historic Places
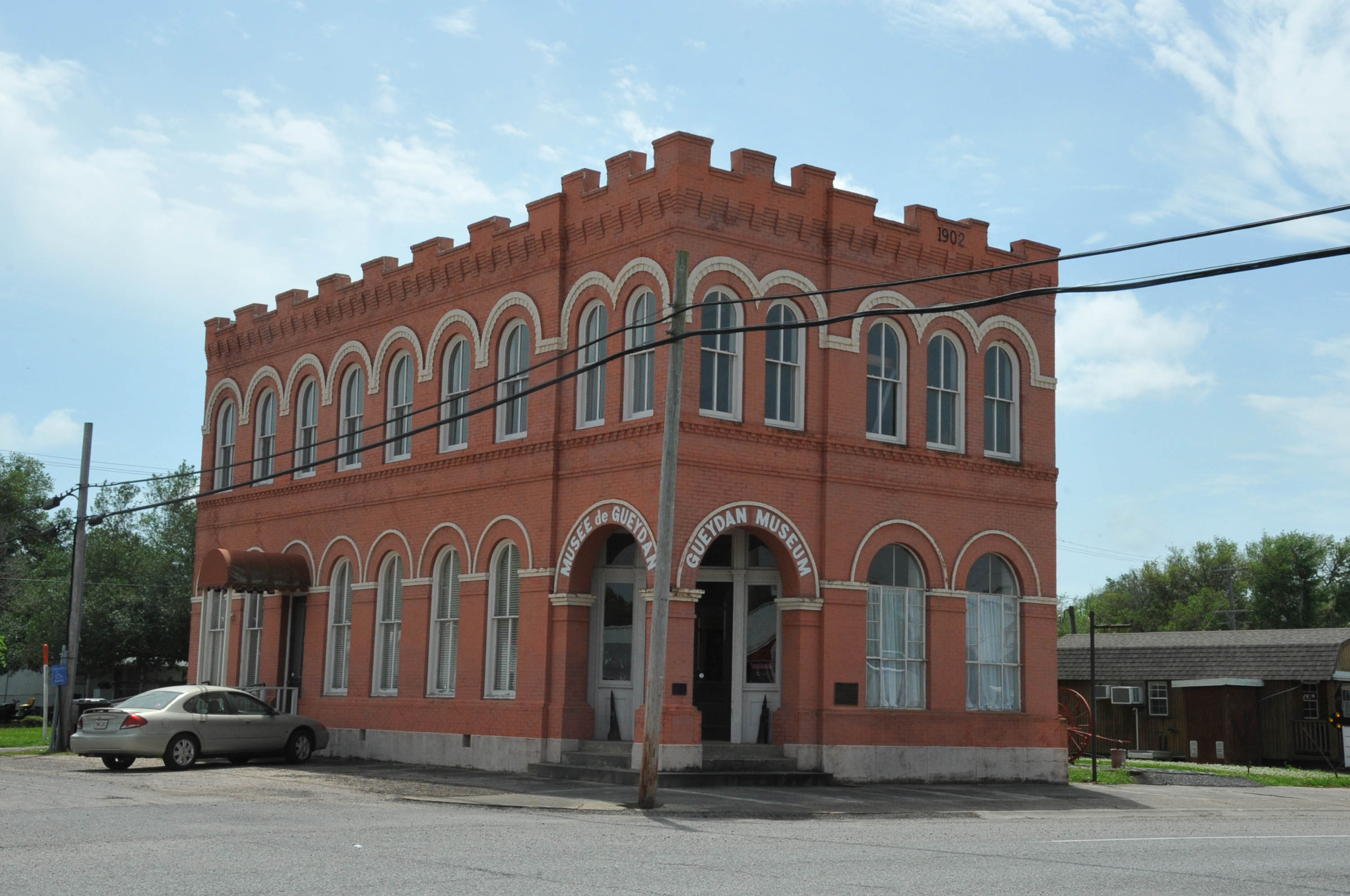

- Location within Louisiana Location within the United States
- Location: 214 Main St., Gueydan, Louisiana
- Coordinates: 30°1′28″N 92°30′45″W
- Area: less than one acre
- Built: 1902
- Architectural style: Romanesque
- NRHP reference No.: 90000747
- Added to NRHP: May 10, 1990

The Bank of Gueydan, located at 214 Main St. in Gueydan in Vermilion Parish, Louisiana, was built in 1902. It was listed on the National Register of Historic Places in 1990.

It is Romanesque Revival in style.

It is a two-story masonry commercial building with two well-preserved arcaded exterior faces onto the two streets of its corner location.
