= Robert James Turnbull =

American lawyer, planter, writer and politician

Robert James Turnbull (January 1775 - June 15, 1833) was an American lawyer, planter, writer and politician from South Carolina who also published under the name Brutus. His essays in the Charleston Mercury advocating nullification were published as a pamphlet under the title The Crisis: Or, Essays on the Usurpations of the Federal Government, which has been described as "the handbook for nullification and resistance."

== Background ==
Turnbull's father was Andrew Turnbull, a British physician who married a Greek wife (a native of Smyrna, where he had worked for British interests). Dr. Turnbull was given a grant by the British Crown in 1772 to establish a colony in Florida, which was settled by about 15,000 Greeks and other immigrants from the Mediterranean, with the largest number coming from the island of Menorca. The colony was not a large success, and Dr. Turnbull lost his grants. The Turnbull family settled in Charleston, South Carolina, when the British Army occupied the city during the American Revolution. Robert James Turnbull, who was born in New Smyrna, Florida in January 1775, was still an infant when his family moved to Charleston. After the war ended, Dr. Turnbull, Robert's father, refused to take up American citizenship. Robert was sent to school in England after the war, during which time his Visit to the "Philadelphia Penitentiary" (which discussed the penitentiary concept and argued against capital punishment) was published in London (1797). It was translated into French in 1800, and gained him some notice in the United States as well as in Europe. He returned to the United States, and studied law in Charleston and Philadelphia, Pennsylvania. He took up legal practice in Charleston until 1810, when he moved to a large plantation in the rural part of the state.

== Denmark Vesey ==
In July 1822, Turnbull served on the seven-man court that tried Denmark Vesey and a number of his co-conspirators, who had planned a slave rebellion. It sentenced 34 of them to death (including Vesey and his closest lieutenants, Peter Poyas and Gullah Jack) and 37 others to penal transportation outside the state.

== Political leadership ==
Turnbull wrote a series of articles on nullification and free trade in 1827 for the Charleston Mercury which were afterward issued as The Crisis and helped cement his place as a leader in the nullification faction in South Carolina politics. He was a member of the 1831 free trade convention in Columbia, South Carolina and a similar one in Charleston in 1832; he wrote the report of the 1831 convention. In November 1832, Turnbull served as a delegate to the South Carolina convention that passed the Ordinance of Nullification, which declared that the tariffs of 1828 and 1832 were unconstitutional and unenforceable within the state after February 1, 1833. He also prepared the report of the convention. He died in Charleston on June 15, 1833, during the late stages of the Nullification Crisis which he had played such a role in precipitating.
