= Abbeville (Lancaster, Pennsylvania) =

Historic house in Pennsylvania, United States

- U.S. National Register of Historic Places
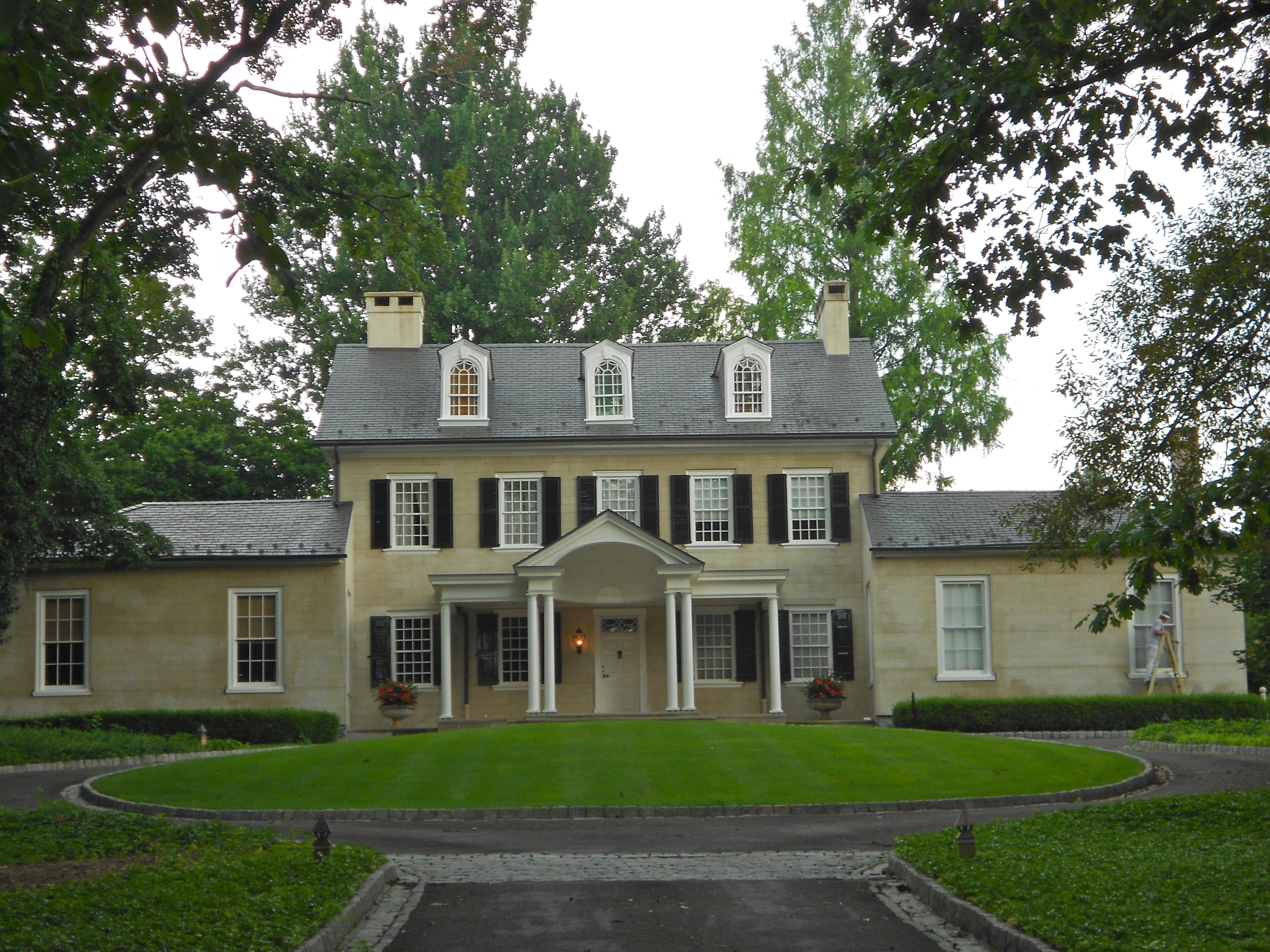

- Location within Pennsylvania Location within the United States
- Interactive map showing the location of Abbeville
- Location: 1140 Columbia Ave., Lancaster Township, Pennsylvania
- Coordinates: 40°02′15.9″N 76°20′06.8″W
- Area: 5 acres (2.0 ha)
- Built: 1755–1756, 1790, 1826
- Architectural style: Georgian
- NRHP reference No.: 78002414
- Added to NRHP: December 14, 1978

Abbeville, also known as Mt. Pleasant, is a historic home located at 1140 Columbia Avenue in Lancaster Township, Lancaster County, Pennsylvania.

It was listed on the National Register of Historic Places in 1978.

== History and architectural features ==
The property on which this historic two-story, stuccoed stone structure was erected dates to 1717 when William Penn awarded a land grant of 1,000 acres near the Little Conestoga Creek in what would later become Lancaster County, Pennsylvania to Hans Brubaker and Christian Hershey. The original residence was built on the southern portion of this land between 1755 and 1756 by Christian Stoneman or John Stoner. Initially measuring twenty by seventeen feet, its original ceilings and fireplace were still visible at the time that this property was placed on the National Register of Historic Places in 1978. In 1790, John Stoner, a successful miller, enlarged the home by erecting a large 2 1/2-story, five bay by three bay Georgian style dwelling in front of the earlier section.

The residence and property were then acquired circa 1825 by William Coleman, a prominent, 19th-century ironmaster whose daughter Ann Caroline Coleman (1796-1819) had been the fiancée of future U.S. President James Buchanan prior to her death in 1819. A smokehouse, which is one of the contributing structures to this historic property, was also added sometime around 1825. Advertised for sale in the Lancaster Journal on November 2, 1825, as a "beautiful country seat and farm called 'Mount Pleasant,'" it was purchased in 1826 by Langdon Cheves, who had served as the ninth Speaker of the U.S. House of Representatives from January 19, 1814, to March 3, 1815. Cheves subsequently added two side wings to each side of the 1790 section, and renamed the property as "Abbeville" in honor of his birthplace, Abbeville, South Carolina.

When Cheves chose to return to South Carolina circa 1830, Coleman reacquired the property, and held it until 1835 when it was converted into the Abbeville Institute. Inspired by the educational methods of Dr. William Augustus Muhlenberg, co-rector of St. James Episcopal Church and the father of church schools in America, it subsequently became a prominent school for boys. Muhlenberg departed Lancaster in 1826 and founded his famous Church Institute at Flushing, Long Island, in 1828, but he had left a lasting scholastic legacy as founder of the Second Public School District in Pennsylvania.

The school and land were then sold to businessman Christopher Hager in 1851, who owned Hager's department store and was responsible for building the Fulton Opera House.

A stable and carriage house were built circa 1875; both are now considered contributing structures.

In 1926, C. Dudley Armstrong, vice president of Armstrong World Industries, purchased the home, which remained in the Armstrong family through at least the late 1940s. It was also later owned by Dr. John Farmer, and his wife, who were responsible for nominating the historic property for placement on the National Register of Historic Places on February 17, 1978. The property was then officially listed on the NRHP later that same year.

Abbeville was then purchased by Robert and Ruth Ecklin in 1995.
