= Glendale School District =

Glendale School District may refer to one of the school districts in the United States:

- Glendale-River Hills School District, serving Glendale, Wisconsin
- Glendale School District (Oregon), serving Glendale, Oregon
- Glendale School District (Pennsylvania), serving parts of Cambria and Clearfield counties in Pennsylvania
- Glendale Unified School District, serving Glendale, California
- Glendale Union High School District, serving Glendale, Arizona
- Glendale School District (Arkansas), former school district in Arkansas
