= Happyville, South Carolina =

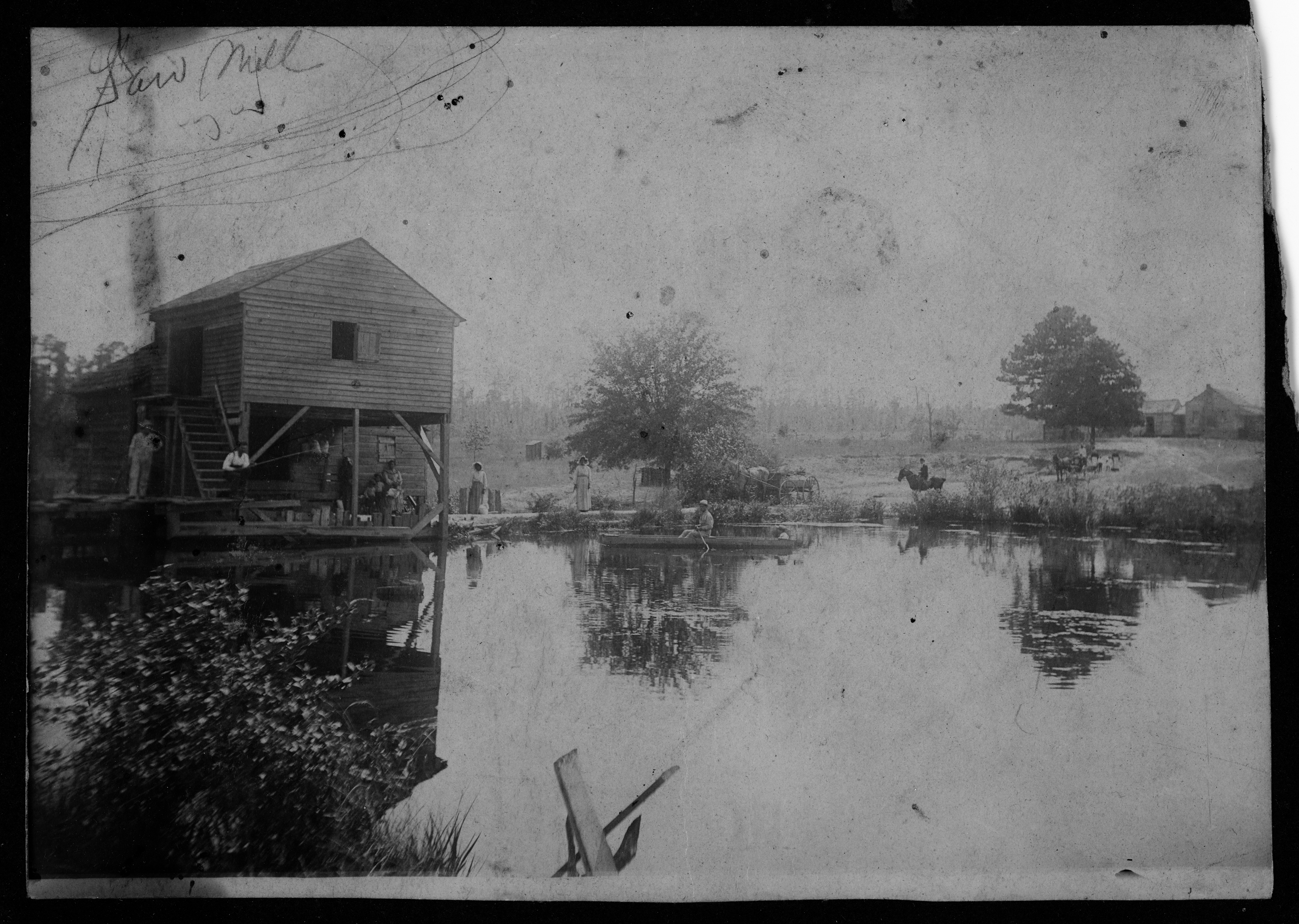
Saw Mill - Happyville - Aiken, South Carolina ~1905

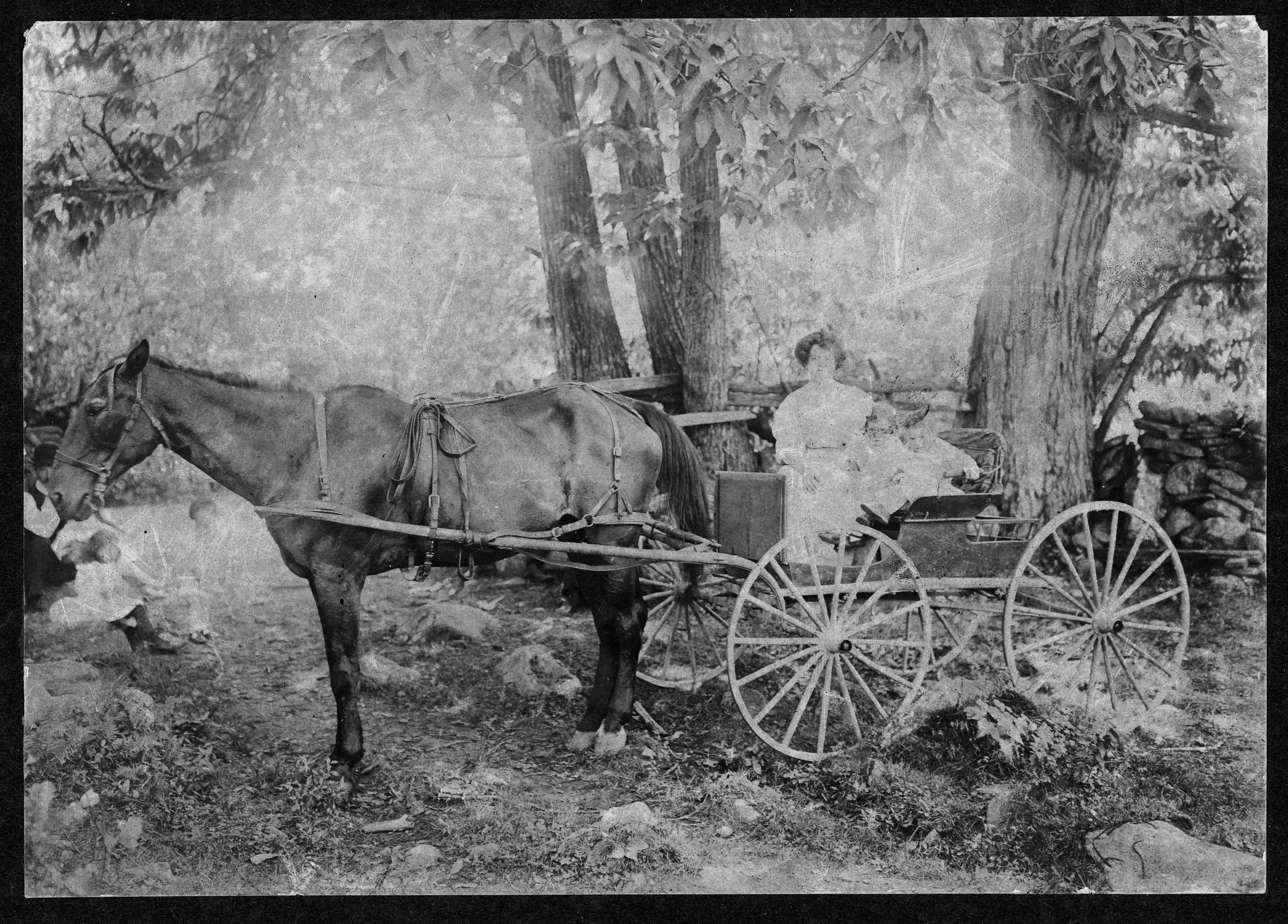
Pauline Selmonsky and her children Joe and Mary - Happyville - Aiken, South Carolina ~1905

Happyville, South Carolina was a short-lived rural Jewish agricultural settlement of 2,300 acres located in Aiken County, South Carolina, between the communities of Aiken and Montmorenci. The colony was founded by Yiddish-speaking Russian-Jewish socialists who wanted an escape from the sweatshops of New York City.

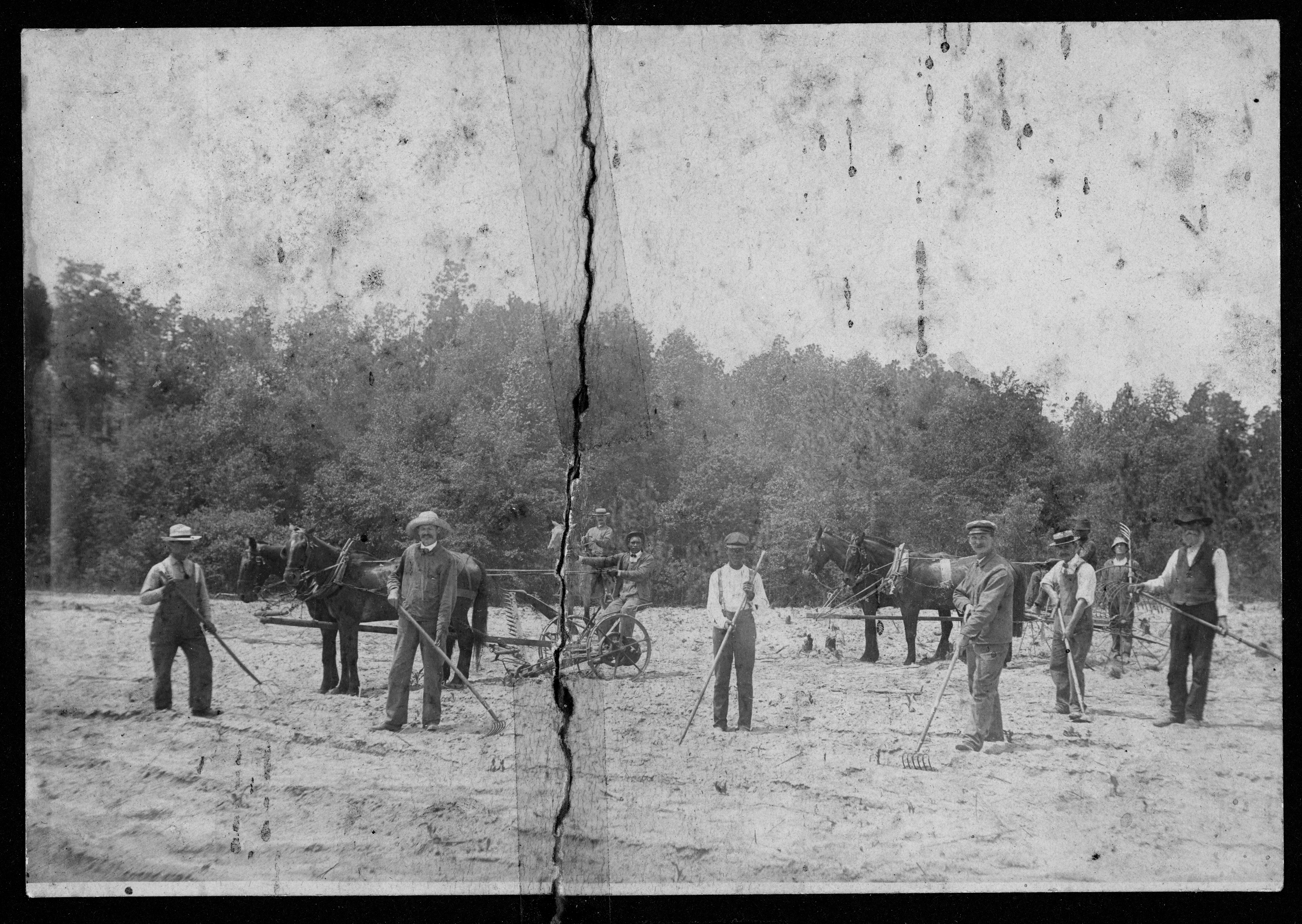
Men in field - Philip Selmonsky third from the right - Happyville - Aiken, South Carolina ~1905.

== History ==
Between 1890 and the 1920s, many Jewish immigrants settled in or near Aiken. The immigrants were Eastern European Ashkenazi Jews, mostly from Russia and Poland. In 1905, a group of Russian-Jewish socialists from New York founded a farming colony in Aiken County that they called "Happyville". The residents of the colony grew watermelon, cotton, corn, and grapes. Community members would fish for catfish, pike, sunfish, smelt, and hold fish fries. Lumber was also cut and sold. During the early 20th century, the state of South Carolina created the Department of Agriculture, Commerce, and Immigration at the urging of a wealthy banker in Columbia, with the intention of attracting "desirable" European immigrants, particularly Russians. The department's campaign, printed in both German and Yiddish, was called "South Carolina, The Garden of America", and attracted the attention of the Jewish-American socialist Charles Weintraub and his business associate Morris Latterman. Together Weintraub and Latterman purchased the Sheffield Phelps Plantation, a former slave plantation. The project was blighted by bad weather, insufficient funds, and land unsuitable for growing crops. By July 1908, the population dispersed and the land was sold back to Weintraub. Weintraub owned the land in partnership with three brothers from the Surasky family until 1918 when the Suraskys bought Weintraub's share of the land and sold the property.

== See also ==
- Alliance Colony
- Am Olam
- History of the Jews in Charleston, South Carolina
- Yaazor
