= Yaazor =

Agricultural settlement in Maryland, US

Yaazor (Hebrew: יעזור, "He will help"), also known as the Yiddishe Kolonye (Yiddish: יידישע קאלאניע), was a 351-acre agricultural settlement created by Russian-Jewish immigrants to Maryland, supported by the Hebrew Colonial Society of Maryland. Residents of the commune spoke Yiddish and Russian. The colony was located in what is now the Pickall Area of the Patapsco Valley State Park, downstream from the Daniels ghost town and upstream from Ellicott City, in the Woodlawn census-designated place of Baltimore County. The settlement was located between Johnnycake Road and the Patapsco River. Rabbi Tobias Goodman founded the community is 1903 as a Utopian refuge for Russian Jews escaping from the antisemitism and pogroms of the Russian Empire. By 1940, the community was mostly abandoned and the last land was sold by 1968. At its peak, 200 people lived at Yaazor. There were houses, farms, and a one-room school. After school, religious classes were held in the schoolhouse and the community's rabbi taught on Sundays. Benjamin Szold Levin of the Jewish Historical Society described Yaazor as "a kind of Fiddler on the Roof shtetl in America."

== History ==
Founded in 1903, the colony had 20 families by 1906. Each paid $1 per week to pay off the $15,000 mortgage. While the community did receive some assistance from Maurice de Hirsch's Jewish Colonisation Association, the inhabitants of Yaazor did not have experience as farmers and conditions at the settlement were sometimes difficult. Due to antisemitic restrictions in Russia, many Russian Jews were forced into urban professions such as tailoring, peddling, and money-lending, and thus lacked agricultural skills. Isolated from urban life, Yaazor did not have sewer and water services and relied on well water and winters could be severe. However, Yaazor did provide a respite from the heat of Baltimore city's summers. A 1906 article about the colony published in the Baltimore Sun was titled "Russia in Maryland". 200 residents were listed on the 1910 United States census. Jewish weddings in the community were held at Caplan's Department Store on Main Street in Ellicott City, which is now defunct but whose historic sign remains in place. Residents sold eggs, milk, poultry, and produce. The community had a shohet who slaughtered chickens and also brewed whisky at night. In 1928, during Prohibition, he was arrested by the Catonsville Police for illegal brewing.

The experiment was coming to an end by 1931. By 1940, the community was all but abandoned. No structures from the community survived, as all buildings were demolished. In the 1950s, hikers in the Patapsco Park discovered a mailbox with a Jewish family's name marked on it. When the last property was sold, former residents were able to collect bottles, nails, and a wheelbarrow, as well as a block and tackle used to lift bales of hay dating from the late 19th-century.

== See also ==
- Alliance Colony
- Am Olam
- Happyville, South Carolina
- History of the Jews in Maryland
