= William Frey =

William Frey could refer to:

- William Frey (1839–1888), positivist leader of the New Odessa community
- William C. Frey (1919–1979), American jurist
- William H. Frey (born 1947), American demographer
- William Frey (bishop) (1930–2020), American Episcopal bishop
