= Carolinas campaign =

1865 military campaign of the American Civil War

Carolinas Campaign
- Part of the American Civil War
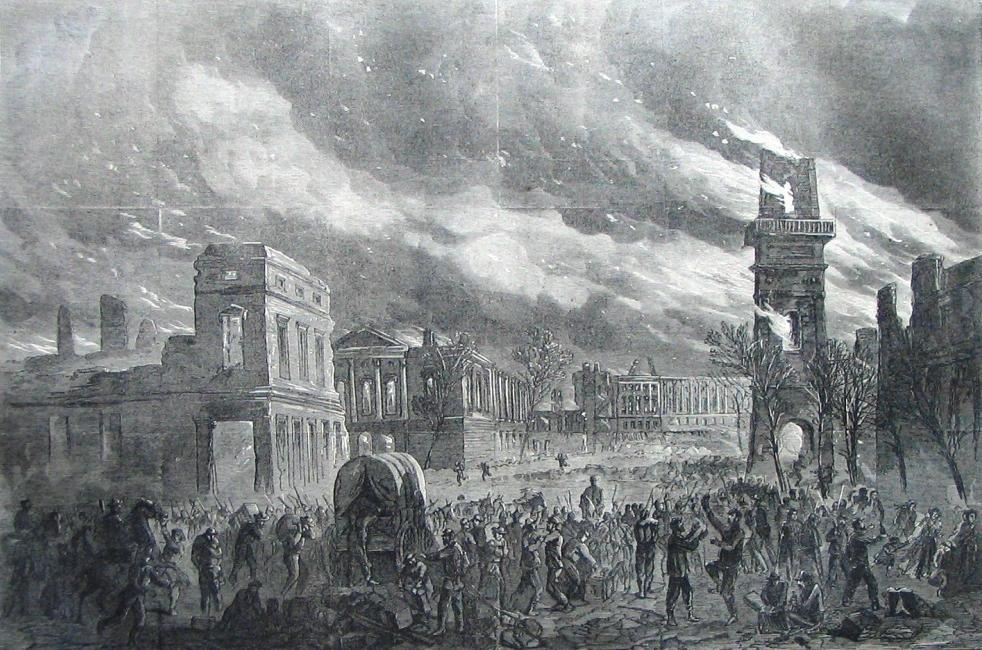
- The Burning of Columbia, South Carolina, on February 17, 1865, as depicted in Harper's Weekly
- Operational scope: Strategic offensive
- Location: 32.128705°N 81.151907°W
- Commanded by: (United States) Maj. Gen. William T. Sherman
- Objective: Cooperate with Lieut. Gen. Ulysses S. Grant's movement against Petersburg
- Date: January 1 – April 26, 1865 (3 months, 3 weeks and 4 days)
- Executed by: Army of the Tennessee, Army of the Ohio, and the Army of Georgia
- Outcome: Union victory

The Carolinas campaign (January 1 – April 26, 1865), also known as the Campaign of the Carolinas, was the final campaign conducted by the Union army against the Confederate army in the western theater of the American Civil War. (Note: Although the campaign took place entirely in states on the Eastern Seaboard of the United States, it is considered part of the Western Theater because it was a continuation of an offensive by the western armies under Union Maj. Gen. William T. Sherman (the Military Division of the Mississippi), starting in Tennessee in the previous year.) On January 1, Maj. Gen. William T. Sherman advanced north from Savannah, Georgia, through the Carolinas, with the intention of linking up with Union forces in Virginia. The campaign culminated in the defeat of Confederate Gen. Joseph E. Johnston's army at the Battle of Bentonville, and its unconditional surrender to Union forces on April 26, 1865. Coming just two weeks after the defeat of Robert E. Lee's army at the Battle of Appomattox Court House, it signaled that the war was effectively over.

== Background ==
Maj. Gen. William T. Sherman had taken a large force through Georgia in the 1864 Atlanta campaign, capturing the namesake city itself in September. The fall of 1864 was focused on countering Confederate Gen. John Bell Hood in the Franklin–Nashville campaign. Sherman eventually pulled out from the campaign, leaving Gen. George H. Thomas to deal with Hood, while the main army returned to Atlanta. Sherman then began his "March to the Sea", culminating in the December capture of Savannah.

At this point, Sherman had 60,000 veteran troops under his command, which Union Army general-in-chief Lt. Gen. Ulysses S. Grant wanted redeployed for use in Virginia. Grant ordered Sherman to embark his army on ships to reinforce the Army of the Potomac and the Army of the James in Virginia, where Grant was bogged down in the siege of Petersburg against Confederate General Robert E. Lee. Sherman had bigger things in mind. He persuaded Grant that he should march north through the Carolinas instead, destroying everything of military value along the way, similar to his 'March to the Sea' through Georgia. Sherman was particularly interested in targeting South Carolina, as the first state to secede from the Union, for the effect it would have on Southern morale. Grant acceded, and Sherman received the go ahead on Christmas Eve. The rest of the year was spent in preparations.

Sherman intended for the bulk of his Army to move out in mid-January 1865, but maneuvering began on December 30, 1864.

Sherman's army commenced toward Columbia, South Carolina, in late January 1865.

After the war, Sherman remarked that while his March to the Sea had captured popular imagination, it had been child's play compared to the Carolinas Campaign.

Sherman's plan was to make a feint for Augusta, Georgia, and Charleston, South Carolina, while instead truly aiming for Goldsboro, North Carolina. As with his Georgia operations, Sherman marched his armies in multiple directions simultaneously, confusing the scattered Confederate defenders as to his first true objective, which was the state capital of Columbia, South Carolina.

== Opposing forces ==
=== Union ===
The Carolinas campaign was arranged similarly to the Atlanta campaign. Sherman's 60,079 men were divided into two wings. The right wing of two corps was the Army of the Tennessee, under Maj. Gen. Oliver Otis Howard composed of the XV and XVII corps. The left wing was also made of two corps, the XIV and XX, under Maj. Gen. Henry W. Slocum, which was later formally designated the Army of Georgia. Reinforcements arrived regularly during his march north, and by April 1 he commanded 88,948 men after the Army of the Ohio under Maj. Gen. John M. Schofield joined up at Goldsboro, NC.

Continuing the precedent set in the March to the Sea, the Army would be cut off from its supply lines to enable mobility. The Army travelled light: a great deal of ammunition was carried, but minimal food, animal feed, or other supplies. Sherman did not expect a resupply until he reached Cape Fear River, in the middle of North Carolina. The Army was to live off the land, and the locals. Very strict orders were issued regulating foraging. Soldiers could requisition select supplies from locals, but could not enter homes or otherwise trespass, could not harass them, and were to leave enough food for the locals to live off. The destruction of property was to be ordered only by the Corps commanders, which would reflect the level of harassment the army received. If the army were left unbothered, no property was to be destroyed. But if guerilla action impeded the army, the area would be destroyed commensurate with the level of activity. Compliance with the foraging orders varied; some foragers were apt to steal considerably from the locals.

The journey through the Carolinas would be muddy and difficult, especially given that roads were to be for vehicles only; men would have to walk through the wilderness alongside. Military pioneers were used extensively to build bridges, and vast lengths of corduroy road. Noted one Confederate soldier: "If Sherman's army had gone to hell and wanted to march over and there were no other way, they would corduroy it and march on."

=== Confederate ===
Sherman's opponents on the Confederate side had considerably fewer men. The primary force in the Carolinas was the battered Army of Tennessee, again under the command of Gen. Joseph E. Johnston (who had been relieved of duty by Confederate President Jefferson Davis during the Atlanta campaign against Sherman and restored after John Bell Hood led a disastrous invasion of Tennessee). His strength was recorded in mid-March at 9,513 and 15,188 by mid-April. The army was organized into three corps, commanded by Lt. Gen. William J. Hardee, Lt. Gen. Alexander P. Stewart, and Lt. Gen. Stephen D. Lee. Also in the Carolinas were cavalry forces from the division of Maj. Gen. Wade Hampton and a small number in Wilmington, North Carolina, under Gen. Braxton Bragg.

== Engagements ==
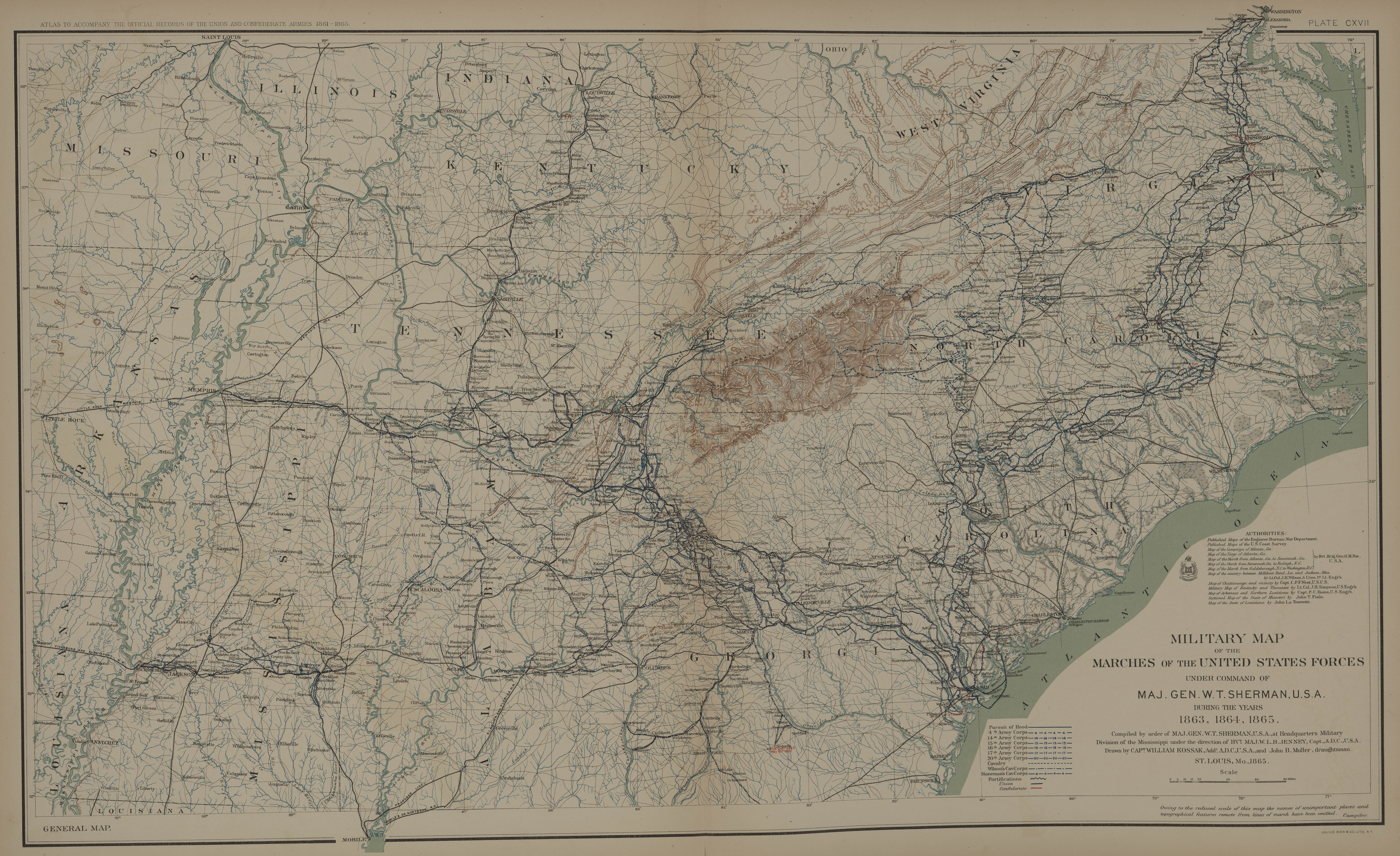
Sherman's advance: Tennessee, Georgia and Carolinas (1863–65)

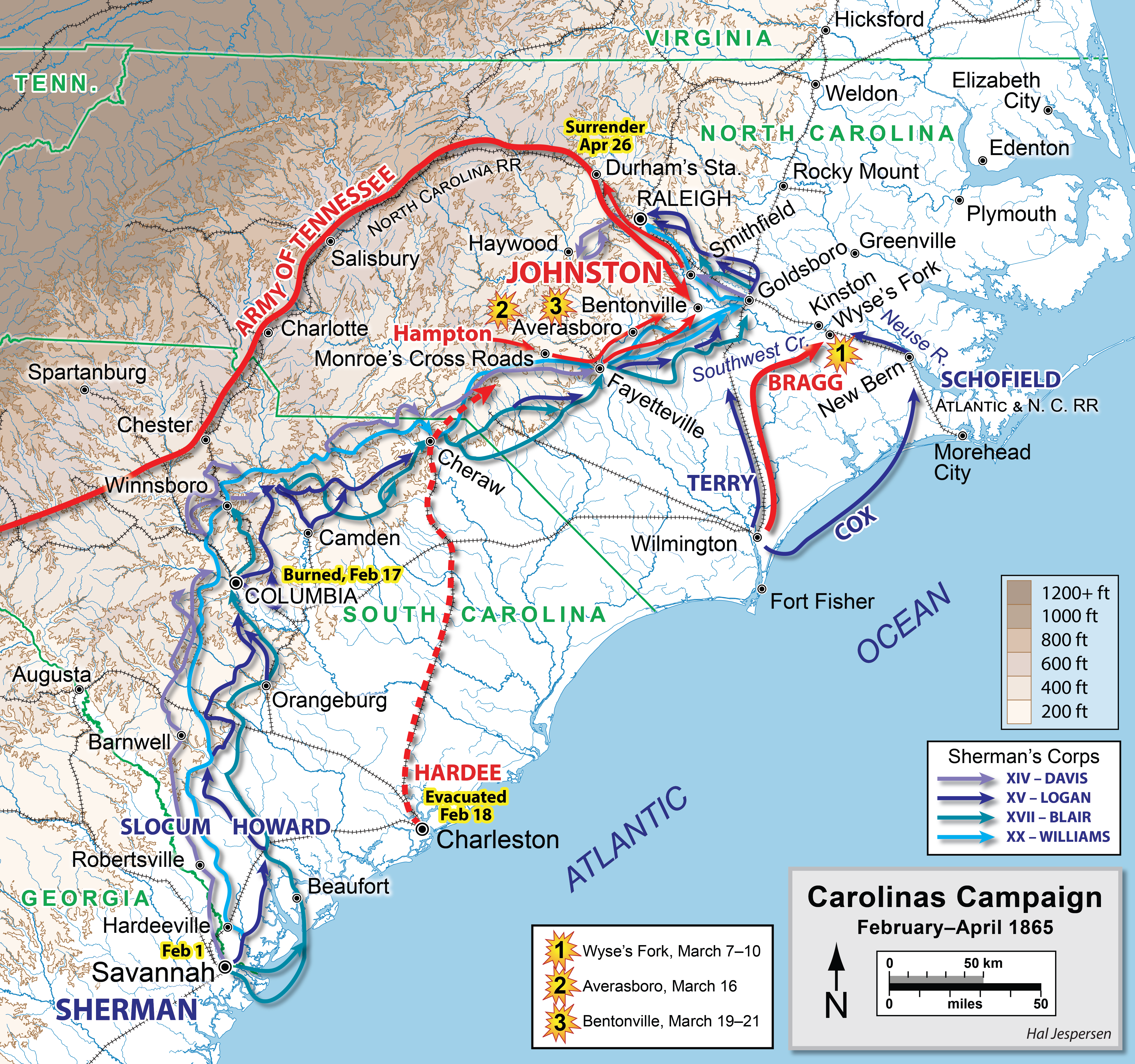
Movements in Carolinas campaign

The following operations were carried out during the Carolinas campaign.

=== Rivers' Bridge (February 3, 1865) ===
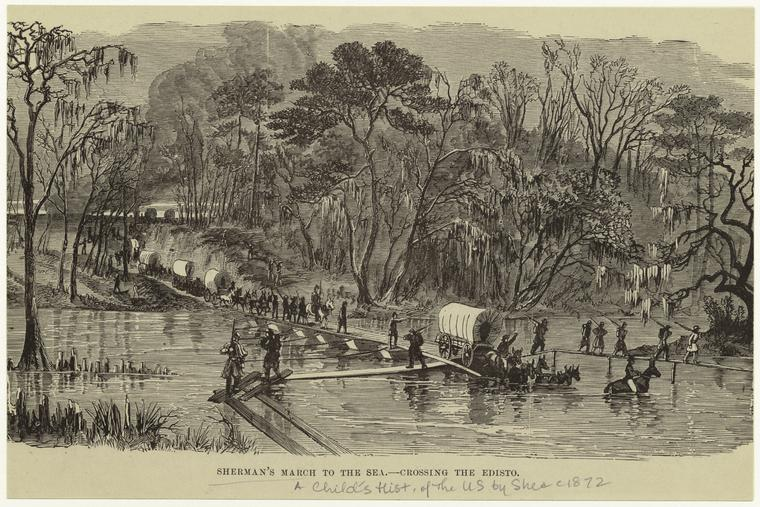
Lithograph of Howard's Corps of Sherman's Army crossing the Edisto during the Carolinas campaign from 1872 children's textbook

The Confederate division of Maj. Gen. Lafayette McLaws attempted to prevent the crossing of the Salkehatchie River by the right wing of Sherman's army. The Union division under Maj. Gen. Francis P. Blair (Howard's army) crossed the river and assaulted McLaws' flank. McLaws withdrew to Branchville, causing only one day's delay in the Union advance.

=== Aiken (February 11) ===
This battle took place entirely in South Carolina. During the battle Hugh Judson Kilpatrick attacked the city of Aiken. Cavalry corps and the Aiken Home Guard, which were under the command of Joseph Wheeler fought Kilpatrick's cavalry corps. Wheeler formed his troopers into a "V" formation, and deployed skirmishers in front of his cavalry. He planned for Kilpatrick to attack the skirmishers, who would then retreat to the center of the "V." His cavalry would then charge and surround Kilpatrick's force. When the battle started, a Confederate soldier shot his gun prematurely. This resulted in Wheeler ordering all his soldiers to attack the Union army. They engaged in hand-to-hand combat. Kilpatrick was defeated and forced back to Montmorenci.

=== Columbia (February 17) ===
On February 17, Sherman captured Columbia, SC and Hampton's cavalry retreated from the city. Union forces were overwhelmed by throngs of liberated Federal prisoners and emancipated slaves. Many soldiers took advantage of ample supplies of liquor in the city and began to drink. Fires began in the city, and high winds spread the flames across a wide area. Most of the central city was destroyed, and the city's fire companies found it difficult to operate in conjunction with the Union army, many of whom were also trying to put out the fire. The burning of Columbia has engendered controversy ever since, with some claiming the fires were accidental, others stating they were a deliberate act of vengeance as in Atlanta, and others claiming that the fires were set by retreating Confederate soldiers who lit bales of cotton on their way out of town. Sherman's forces then destroyed virtually anything of military value in Columbia, including railroad depots, warehouses, arsenals, and machine shops.

On the evening of February 17, the Fort Sumter garrison and all remaining Confederate forces in the Charleston area evacuated north to avoid being cut off by Sherman's advancing army.

More than a month after seizing Fort Fisher, on February 22 Union troops captured the important port of Wilmington, North Carolina, after a small battle.

=== Wyse Fork (March 7–10) ===
Schofield planned to advance inland from Wilmington, NC, in February. At the same time, he assigned Maj. Gen. Jacob D. Cox to direct Union forces from New Bern toward Goldsboro. On March 7, Cox's advance was stopped by divisions under Gen. Braxton Bragg's command at Southwest Creek south of Kinston, North Carolina. On March 8, the Confederates attempted to seize the initiative by attacking the Union flanks. After initial success, their attacks stalled because of faulty communications. On March 9, the Union forces were reinforced and beat back Bragg's renewed attacks on March 10 after heavy fighting. Bragg withdrew across the Neuse River and was unable to prevent the fall of Kinston on March 14.

=== Monroe's Cross Roads (March 10) ===
On March 9, Union troops under Sherman entered Robeson County, North Carolina. In Lumberton, they burned the railway depot and the jail and looted some homes before moving north.

As Sherman's army advanced into North Carolina, Maj. Gen. Judson Kilpatrick's Cavalry Division screened its left flank. On the evening of March 9, two of Kilpatrick's brigades encamped near the Charles Monroe House in Cumberland (now Hoke) County. Early on March 10, Hampton's Confederate cavalry surprised the Federals in their camps, driving them back in confusion and capturing wagons and artillery. The Federals regrouped and counterattacked, regaining their artillery and camps after a desperate fight. With Union reinforcements on the way, the Confederates withdrew.

On March 11, Sherman's force occupied Fayetteville.

=== Averasboro (March 16) ===
On the afternoon of March 15, Kilpatrick's cavalry came up against Hardee's corps deployed across the Raleigh Road near Smithville. After feeling out the Confederate defenses, Kilpatrick withdrew and called for infantry support. During the night, four divisions of the XX Corps arrived to confront the Confederates. At dawn, March 16, the Federals advanced on a division front, driving back skirmishers, but they were stopped by the main Confederate line and a counterattack. Mid-morning, the Federals renewed their advance with strong reinforcements and drove the Confederates from two lines of works, but they were repulsed at a third line. Late afternoon, the Union XIV Corps began to arrive on the field but was unable to deploy before dark because of the swampy ground. Hardee retreated during the night of March 16, after holding up the Union advance for nearly two days.

=== Bentonville (March 19–21) ===
While Slocum's advance was stalled at Averasborough by Hardee's troops, the right wing of Sherman's army under Howard marched toward Goldsboro. On March 19, Slocum encountered the entrenched Confederates of Gen. Joseph E. Johnston who had concentrated to meet his advance at Bentonville. Johnston had increased his forces to about 21,000 men by absorbing the troops under Bragg, who had abandoned Wilmington. Late afternoon, Johnston attacked, crushing the line of the XIV Corps. Only strong counterattacks and desperate fighting south of the Goldsborough Road blunted the Confederate offensive. Elements of the XX Corps were thrown into the action as they arrived on the field. Five Confederate attacks failed to dislodge the Federal defenders, and darkness ended the first day's fighting. During the night, Johnston contracted his line into a "V" to protect his flanks, with Mill Creek to his rear. On March 20, Slocum was heavily reinforced, but fighting was sporadic. Sherman was inclined to let Johnston retreat. On March 21, however, Johnston remained in position while he removed his wounded. Skirmishing heated up along the entire front. In the afternoon, Maj. Gen. Joseph Mower led his Union division along a narrow trace that carried it across Mill Creek into Johnston's rear. Confederate counterattacks stopped Mower's advance, saving the army's only line of communication and retreat. Mower withdrew, ending fighting for the day. During the night, Johnston retreated across the bridge at Bentonville. Union forces pursued at first light, driving back Wheeler's rearguard and saving the bridge. Federal pursuit was halted at Hannah's Creek after a severe skirmish. Sherman, after regrouping at Goldsboro, pursued Johnston toward Raleigh.

== Aftermath ==
Sherman's Carolina campaign, in which his troops marched 425 miles (684 km) in 50 days, was similar to his march to the sea through Georgia, although physically more demanding. However, the Confederate forces opposing him were much smaller and more dispirited. In April 1865, Sherman entered Raleigh and seized the Governor's Palace. When Joseph E. Johnston met with Jefferson Davis in Greensboro on April 12–13, he told the Confederate president:

Our people are tired of the war, feel themselves whipped, and will not fight. Our country is overrun, its military resources greatly diminished, while the enemy's military power and resources were never greater and may be increased to any extent desired. ... My small force is melting away like snow before the sun.

On April 18, three days after the assassination of President Abraham Lincoln, Johnston signed an armistice with Sherman at Bennett Place, a farmhouse near Durham Station. Sherman faced political resistance for offering terms of surrender to Johnston that encompassed political issues as well as military, without authorization from General Grant or the United States government. The confusion on this issue lasted until April 26, when Johnston agreed to purely military terms and formally surrendered his army and all Confederate forces in the Carolinas, Georgia, and Florida. It was the second significant surrender that month. On April 9, Robert E. Lee had surrendered the Army of Northern Virginia at Appomattox Court House. It was the virtual end for the Confederacy, although some smaller forces held out, particularly in the Trans-Mississippi region, into the summer.

== Bibliography ==
- Barrett, John Gilchrist (1956). Sherman's march through the Carolinas (1 ed.). Chapel Hill. ISBN 978-1-4696-1112-9. OCLC 864900203.
- Evans, William McKee (2015). To Die Game: The Story of the Lowry Band, Indian Guerillas of Reconstruction (reprint ed.). Syracuse: Syracuse University Press. ISBN 9780815603061.
- Lucas, Marion Brunson (1976). Sherman and the burning of Columbia (1 ed.). College Station: Texas A & M University Press. ISBN 0-89096-018-6. OCLC 2331311.
