= Experimental Farm Network =

Nonprofit organization

The Experimental Farm Network is an organization based in Philadelphia, Pennsylvania whose goal is to protect the world's biodiversity by protecting rare seeds. The non profit group was co founded by Nathan Kleinman and Dusty Hinz in 2013. Past projects the Experimental Farm Network has done include a perennial kale project and a perennial sorghum project.
