= Glendale School District (Oregon) =

School district in Oregon, United States

Address
- 303A Mehlwood Lane Glendale, Oregon, 97442; United States

District information
- Type: Public
- Grades: PreK–12
- NCES District ID: 4105640

Students and staff
- Students: 280 (2020–2021)
- Teachers: 17.49 (on an FTE basis)
- Staff: 29.39 (on an FTE basis)
- Student–teacher ratio: 16.01:1

Other information
- Website: www.glendale.k12.or.us

Glendale School District is a small school district in Glendale, Oregon, United States.

It serves two schools: Glendale Jr/Sr High School and Glendale Elementary School.
