= Glendale Jr/Sr High School =

Location
- 10598 Azalea Glen Road; Glendale, (Douglas County), Oregon 97442; United States; 42.743666°N 123.414507°W

Information
- Type: Public
- School district: Glendale School District
- Principal: Randy Smolensky
- Grades: 7–12
- Enrollment: 289 (2023-2024)
- Colors: Red, white, and black
- Athletics conference: OSAA Mountain View Conference 2A-2
- Mascot: Pirate
- Website: www.glendale.k12.or.us
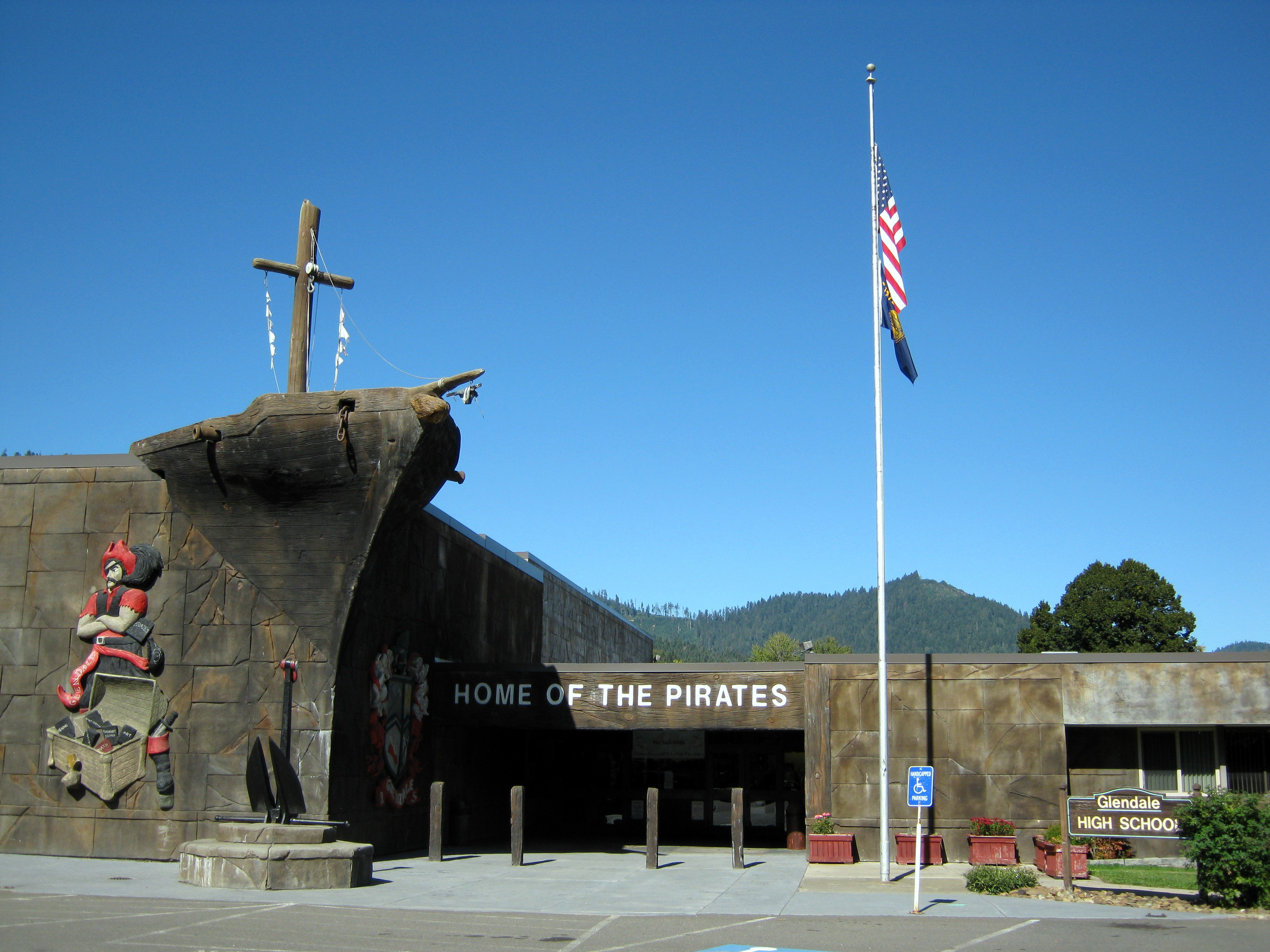

Glendale Jr/Sr High School is a public school in Glendale, Oregon, United States, serving middle and high school students. It is one of two schools in the Glendale School District.

== Notable alumni ==
Kase Saylor graduated from Glendale Jr/Sr High School in 1996. After his career in the US Army, he played for the Cincinnati Reds from 2002 to 2014.

== Academics ==
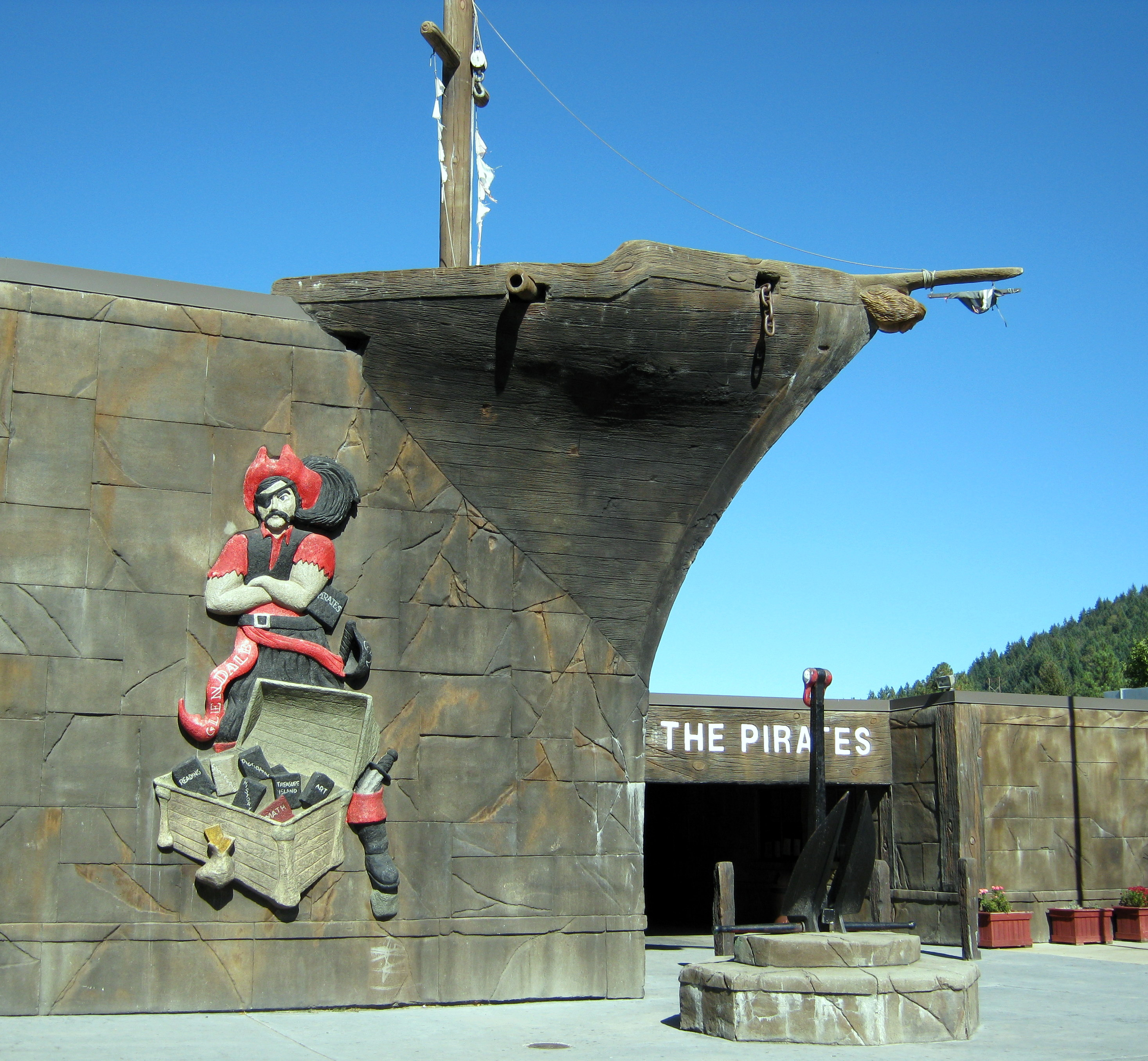
Pirate mascot at entrance

In 2008, 69% of the school's seniors received a high school diploma. Of 42 students, 29 graduated, 11 dropped out, one received a modified diploma, and one was still in high school the following year.
