= Nathan Kleinman =

American farmer, plant breeder, and political activist

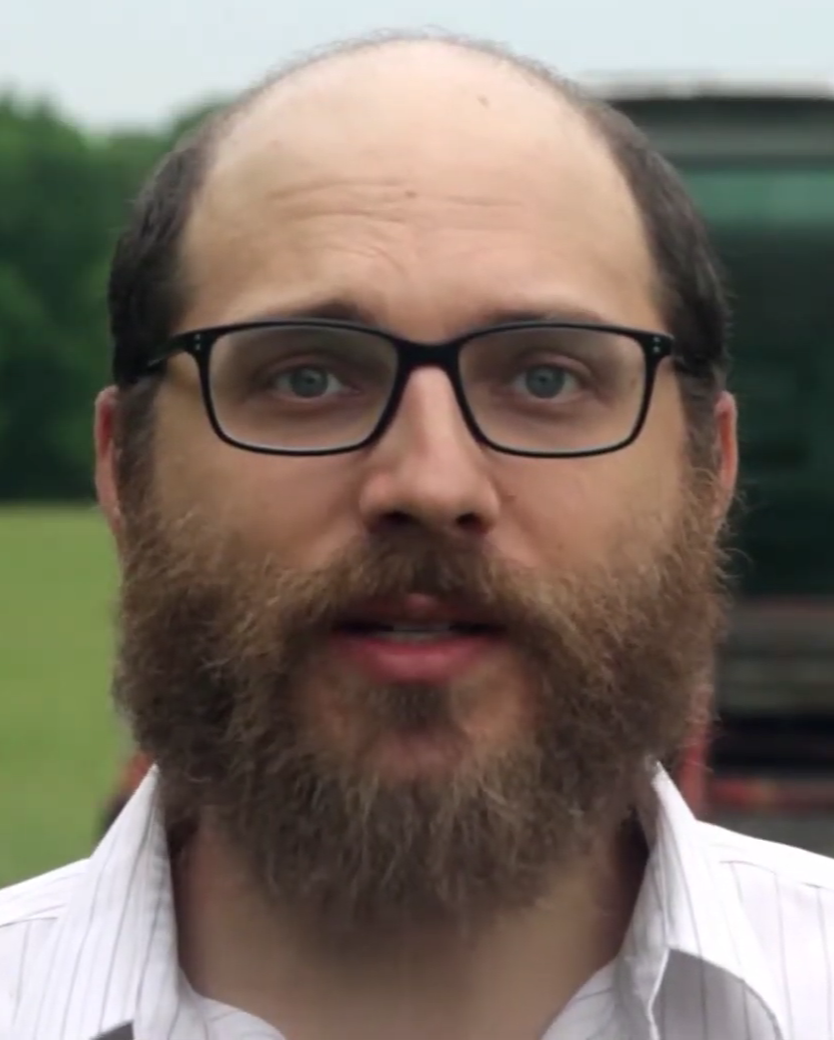
- Kleinman, 2018

Personal details
- Born: Philadelphia, Pennsylvania
- Education: Georgetown University
- Website: www.nateforcongress.com

Nathan Kleinman is an American farmer, plant breeder, and political activist. A Philadelphia native, he was an active participant in the Occupy movement. He has unsuccessfully sought a nomination for the United States House of Representatives in 2012 and 2018.

== Early life and education ==
Kleinman is Jewish. Kleinman is a native of the Philadelphia area. His mother is a pediatrician. He graduated from the Georgetown University School of Foreign Service in 2005.

== Career and activism ==
Kleinman worked for the prisoner advocacy group Federal Prison Consultants. In 2005, Kleinman staged a twelve-day fast in Lafayette Square outside the White House to raise awareness of the genocide in Darfur. He was formerly a legislative assistant to state Representative Josh Shapiro, a field staffer for Barack Obama's 2008 campaign, and an aide to U.S. Representative Joe Sestak during his 2010 Senate campaign.

=== Occupy movement ===
Kleinman was extensively involved in the Occupy Philly movement, being one of the first Occupy activists to seek public office.

In 2014, Kleinman and others organized Occupy Sandy New Jersey, an Occupy group focused on Hurricane Sandy recovery efforts. He organized various volunteer rebuilding initiatives and was a member of the executive committee for the Cumberland County Long-Term Recovery Group. Kleinman criticized Governor Chris Christie's actions on the storm and on one occasion yelled at the governor after a speech the governor gave, accusing him of using Sandy funds as his personal "slush fund." Kleinman and Occupy Sandy organized a protest in Trenton in January 2014 (around the time of Christie's second inauguration) to protest Christie's handling of the distribution of Sandy relief funds, which the activists viewed as inequitable.

=== 2012 campaign ===
In 2012, Kleinman ran for the Democratic nomination for Congress from Pennsylvania's 13th congressional district, challenging incumbent Democratic representative Allyson Schwartz. At the time, Kleinman lived in Jenkintown, Pennsylvania. Kleinman submitted voter signatures to put his name on the primary election ballot, but some of his signatures were challenged, and he withdrew his petition to be on the ballot and became write-in candidate. Kleinman ran as a candidate aligned with the Occupy movement. Schwartz received 36,756 votes (99.9%) in the Democratic primary, with scattered write-in candidates receiving 35 votes (0.1%).

=== Experimental Farm Network and other agricultural work ===
Kleinman has a longtime interest in horticulture, and is a farmer in Elmer, New Jersey. He runs the Experimental Farm Network, a non-profit, volunteer seed-sharing and plant breeding group, which Kleinman co-founded with his friend Dusty Hinz. The group focuses on sustainable agriculture, and collects seeds from war-torn countries, including Syria, along with countries threatened by climate change, to preserve plant biodiversity.

Since 2017, Kleinman has been involved with the Alliance Community Reboot (ACRe) a non-profit project that farms land in Pittsgrove Township, New Jersey, that was part of the Alliance Colony, the first Jewish agricultural settlement in the United States. A column in The Philadelphia Inquirer described the group of founders as part of "a new generation of Jewish farmers" in South Jersey.

=== 2018 campaign ===
In 2018, Kleinman ran for the Democratic nomination for New Jersey's 2nd congressional district, challenging state Senator Jeff Van Drew, a conservative Democrat aligned with the party's establishment, and two other candidates for the party's nomination. Kleinman came in last place with 8.6% of the vote, losing to Van Drew (who received 55.4%), and also placing behind retired educator Tanzie Youngblood (who received 19.2% of the vote) and former Cory Booker aide William Cunningham (who received 16.8%).
