= Swanson Group Aviation =

- Company type: Private
- Industry: Aerospace; Logging
- Founded: 1995
- Headquarters: Glendale, Oregon, U.S.
- Key people: Steve Swanson, President and CEO
- Products: Commercial helicopters
- Parent: Swanson Group Mfg., LLC

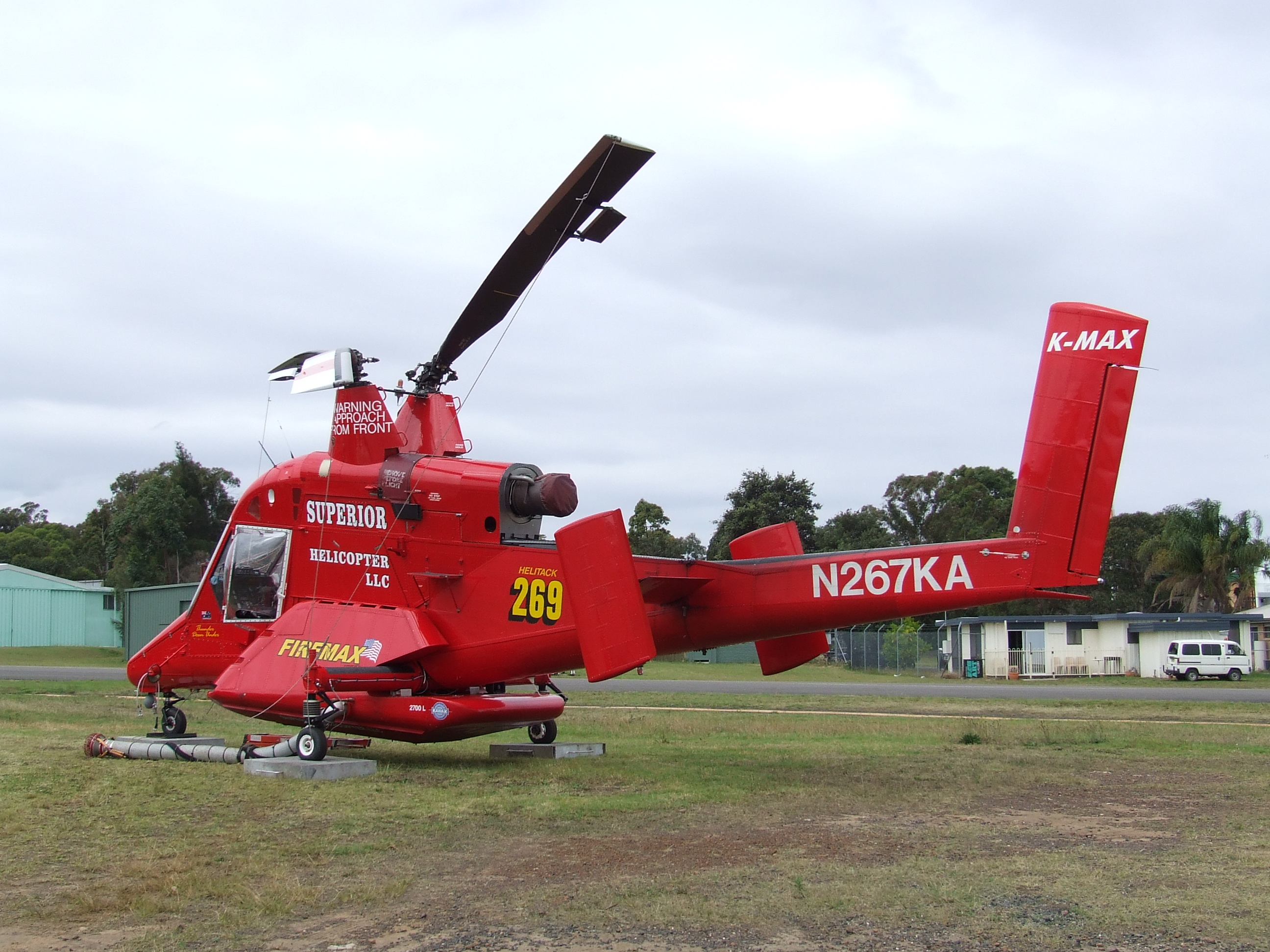
Superior Helicopter Kaman K-Max configured for aerial firefighting, showing the arrangement of the rotors

Swanson Group Aviation is a helicopter operating company based in Glendale, Oregon, United States. It was founded in 1995 as Superior Helicopter, the aviation division of Swanson Group and Superior Lumber.

SGA operates a fleet of Kaman K-MAX helicopters. It is an after-sales support pilot and engineer services division for aerial firefighting, aerial construction and unmanned aircraft support.

SGA was one of the original launch customers of the Kaman K-MAX, and supported the United States Marine Corps during the war in Afghanistan, along with their partners Kaman Aircraft and Lockheed Martin, with the Unmanned Aerial System (UAS) Kmax. The company is considered one of the most experienced operators of this model, having logged over 80,000 flight hours as of 2015.

== See also ==
- Seaside Heliport
