= New Odessa =

Group photo of participants in the New Odessa community in Southern Oregon, circa 1883.

New Odessa was the name of a utopian community established in Douglas County, Oregon, by Jewish adherents of the Am Olam agrarian movement who emigrated from the Tsarist Russia in 1882. At its peak in 1883, about 65 people, mostly young adult men, participated in the project.

Difficult living conditions, factionalism in personal relations, and a lack of female participation contributed to the community's decline, which culminated in an October 1887 bankruptcy and foreclosure of assets in February 1888.

== History ==
=== Am Olam in Imperial Russia ===
The assassination of Tsar Alexander II of Russia in 1881 triggered a series of violent pogroms against the ethnic Jewish population of the empire, clustered into a region known as the Pale of Settlement. In response, many Jews sought to emigrate from the virulently anti-Semitic Russian empire for a new life abroad.

One aid society established to facilitate such refugee emigration was Am Olam ("the eternal people"), an organization promoting resettlement to the United States. The group promoted the idea that Jews should return to the land as farmers rather than remain in the commercial occupations to which they had been consigned in Tsarist Russia. Continuing to participate as small traders and money lenders only served to reinforce negative stereotypes and bolster the conspiracy theories that begot mob violence, the organization asserted, advocating a life on the land as a sort of return to ancient cultural traditions. Circles of Am Olamniks developed in several cities, with the organization's central strength emerging in Odessa, a port city in Ukraine.

The initial group of Am Olam émigrés arrived in New York City in January 1882 with a view to establishing a socialist agricultural commune in a frontier American state. Scouts were sent to examine costs and conditions in Texas, Washington, and Oregon, with the latter appearing the most suitable for colonization to a majority of the Am Olam contingent.

=== Launching the Oregon venture ===
In September 1882, a group of 26 Am Olamniks arrived in Portland by way of the Isthmus of Panama, en route to their ultimate destination in Douglas County in the Umpqua River Valley of Southern Oregon. The group spent their winter working on their English language skills, with some working in Portland to raise money for the venture, while others negotiated the purchase of a heavily-wooded 760 acre parcel in March 1883 — land near the Wolf and Cow Creeks, near the location of the town of Glendale today.

Birdseye view of Glendale, Oregon as it appeared about two decades after the collapse of the New Odessa project. Note the rugged and heavily-timbered terrain.

The communal land parcel — named "New Odessa" in memory of the group's Ukrainian point of origin — was purchased for $4,800, with an initial payment of $2,000 and the balance carried by the seller on a contract. The colonists spent the rest of 1883 clearing the land, generating income through the sale of fuel wood to the Oregon and California Railroad at the contracted rate of $2.50 per cord. Over the course of the commune's existence, some 4,000 cords of wood would be produced for railroad use.

Conditions were primitive. The central farm consisted of three ramshackle buildings, two of which were little more than six feet tall and consisted of two rooms each, and a five room farmhouse. Since these accommodations were insufficient for the colonists already present, construction to expand the farmhouse immediately began, with another story and a half added. The communal kitchen and dining room were located on the ground floor of the farmhouse, with upstairs rooms designated as bedrooms.

As of August 1883, New Odessa counted four married couples and four children among its residents, along with three single women and 32 single males. This severe gender imbalance would eventually contribute to undermining the stability of the colonization project.

A constitution was adopted, prohibiting colonists to work outside the community or to engage in the sale of any products not produced by the group. Families were granted the right to manage their own affairs, while work was assigned based upon individual abilities. Decisions were to be made at membership meetings, with all residents age 18 or over permitted a vote, with 17 year olds allowed a voice but no vote in communal debates. New members were placed on a one-year probation, with those failing to win approval as members forced to leave at the end of this trial period.

The commune was organized on a secular basis, with no observance of the Sabbath or Jewish holidays.

=== Development of New Odessa ===
New Am Olam adherents continued to arrive at New Odessa throughout 1883 and 1884, with the commune's size peaking early in the latter year at about 65 members. The group made recruiting trips in an attempt to gain donations and bolster its numbers, with leading New Odessa resident Paul Kaplan traveling as far as New York City on the commune's behalf in May 1884. With news stories about the project published in the popular press, New Odessa also became a magnet for visitors, including Minnesota rabbi Judah Wechsler, who traveled west in 1884.

One otherwise sympathetic visitor, introduced to the community in 1885 and writing of his experiences for the San Francisco magazine Overland Monthly, pulled no punches about the dismal state of affairs at New Odessa:

"The industrial labors of this society have been, for many reasons, very rude and inefficient; the improvements which they have added to the place as they bought it are of the most limited character, and their farms and buildings are only noticeable for their unthrifty and untidy appearance.... They have no religion; they have hardly a political organization for the management of their affairs; they have no defined code of morals, unless it is to be good....

"Nearly all the members eat and sleep and stagnate — for I can hardly speak of it as living — in a large hall of their own construction: a wretched edifice built of rough boards and unplaned planks, and containing only two apartments, the lower story being the dining-room and kitchen both in one, and the upper story a large sleeping room without partitions. In the sleeping room the Community, with the exception of two or three families who live in small shanties, not only sleeps, but lounges — and lounges, too, a good deal of the time — reads, debates, and dances.

"The bedsteads, which are homemade structures of boards, nailed together in the most flimsy manner, are placed under the eaves in a long row on each side of the room, and the center is furnished with a rough table for writing. As for reading, the Russian of every type I have ever met always reads stretched prone upon his bed....

"The usual dinner at New Odessa [was] bean soup and hard-baked biscuits of unbolted flour called after the name of that wretched dyspeptic Graham."

William Frey (1839–1888), a charismatic communal veteran, was a leading figure in the New Odessa community.

In addition to squalid living conditions and the acute shortage of marriageable women, over time the colony came to be wracked by internal dissent, pitting veteran participant in multiple communal schemes William Frey — a charismatic positivist and non-Jew who had been embraced by the community from the start as a mentor — against a faction of detractors headed by Paul Kaplan, an emigrant from Odessa. The ensuing tension helped to make an already insufferable situation even worse.

Abraham Cahan — himself an adherent of Am Olam as a young man although never a participant in New Odessa — summed up the situation in his memoirs: "In Oregon, their enthusiasm beat every day upon reality, like a ship being battered on the cruel rocks.... Quietly, the dissatisfaction grew and spread and blossomed into misunderstandings, intrigues, and bitter jokes." After just a few years of existence, New Odessa was headed for its finish.

=== Dissolution ===
Although bad living conditions and the skewed gender balance contributed mightily to dissatisfaction, it appears that factional disagreement between the antagonists Frey and Kaplan provided the trigger for dissolution of New Odessa. Sometime during the second half of 1884, Frey decided to quit the community and departed with his wife and family for a new life in London. About 15 members of New Odessa departed at the same time, contributing to a feeling of demoralization rather than victory among those who remained. Adding further to the general sense of malaise, early in 1885 the building which housed New Odessa's library burned to the ground.

Departures began to snowball in the aftermath of the library fire. Even Frey's chief detractor, Paul Kaplan, left the community, returning to New York City to try his hand with a new communal venture, this time a cooperative tenement house in the city's lower East Side. By the fall of 1885, only a small fraction of New Odessa's colonists remained at the site.

In an attempt to generate funds to support the enterprise, those remaining attempted to move from their largely failed agrarian efforts to the laundry business, establishing a firm called the New Odessa Cooperative Laundry — but this venture, too, proved ill-starred and soon withered. Only outside donations from Oregon's Jewish community kept New Odessa afloat during its faltering final years of 1886 and 1887.

Devoid of both visionary leadership and a viable economic plan, New Odessa began to default on its financial obligations, leading to a filing for bankruptcy on October 18, 1887. Foreclosure proceedings began in February 1888, leading to the sale of New Odessa's land and property, thereby writing a conclusion to the failed colonization project.

== Archival resources ==
- "George B. Abdill manuscript collection: Letters and papers concerning the New Odessa Colony," Douglas County Museum, Archives and Manuscripts, Roseburg, OR. Accession number L.991.3.
- "Theodore M. Swett collection on Odessa Colony, 1928-1964," Oregon Historical Society Research Library, Portland, OR. Collection Mss 1383, 1 folder.
