= Am Olam =

Russian Jewish farm collectives in the United States

Am Olam was a movement among Russian Jews to establish agricultural colonies in America. The name means "Eternal People" and is taken from the title of an essay by Peretz Smolenskin. It was founded in Odessa in 1881 by Mania Bakl (Maria Bahal) and Moses Herder, who called for the creation of socialist agricultural communities in the United States.

In the 1880s there were 27 colonies promoted in ten states. (Our Lives: The Chauls Family Saga, The Chauls Siblings, p. 18) Eventually the majority of Am Olam colonies were set up upon a "commercial" rather than communalist basis. The land was owned in common but divided into sections farmed by individuals.

The failures of Am Olam perhaps are best summed up by the expression "cultural distance". Irving Howe, in analyzing the failure of the Am Olam colonies, states: "Most important of all, the leap from a Ukrainian shtetl (small village) to Oregon or South Dakota —the cultural leap, the economic leap —was simply too great. What sheer will and purity of heart could do they did, but sheer will and purity of heart were not enough."

== Background ==
=== Conditions in the Russian Empire ===
Russia transitioned from feudalism to capitalism later than Western Europe. In 1856, Alexander II, the emperor of Russia, freed the serfs. In the wake of emancipation, Jews in Russia gained rights as citizens, but antisemitism rose when Europe was hit with an economic depression in the 1870s. Additionally, anti-monarchy revolutionaries, some of which were Jews, killed Alexander II on March 13, 1881. The assassination inspired a new wave of antisemitism in the Russian empire. Pro-monarch Russians rampaged Jewish settlements, burning homes and food, raping women, and murdering people in attacks called pogroms. Additionally, May Laws, enacted by Alexander III in 1882 further restricted Jews in where they were allowed to settle and how they were allowed to operate economically. Jews in Russia responded differently to these changing conditions. Many participated in a mass emigration. Between 1881 and the beginning of WWI, one third of the Jews living in the Pale of Settlement emigrated out of Russia.

=== Response from Jewish Intellectuals in Russia ===
Zionism, the idea that Jewish people should have a homeland, arose in response to rising antisemitism in this period. Other alternatives to Zionism also arose simultaneously. Many thinkers advocated for Jews to return to the soil: notably Baron Hirsch, who advocated for Jews to farm in Argentina. Additionally, the Bilu movement, which dreamt of agricultural settlements in Palestine. Imagined by Jewish intelligentsia in Odessa, Kiev, and Yelizavetgrad, the creators of the Am Olam vision did not have agricultural experience themselves. Am Olam’s vision for their socialist communities was utopian, with their emblem being a plow and the ten commandments. The founders' beliefs were aligned with the beliefs of Leon Pinsker in his pamphlet “Autoemancipation.” Pinsker advocated for training Jews to collectively farm land in countries other than Russia in service of autonomy and self-emancipation. Jewish youth in the Russian empire were inspired by Leo Tolstoy's idea of agrarian socialism and hoped to improve Jews' economic and social status through participation in agriculture.

== Arrival in the U.S. ==
=== Overview ===
Fleeing from the increasing frequency of Pogroms, many Eastern European Jews migrated to the U.S. As opposed to Jewish immigrants from earlier in the 19th century that had most integrated themselves into American cities, this new wave had their sights set on agricultural life. Nearly all of the immigrants associated with the Am Olam vision were Orthodox Jews and they came as community groups, as opposed to individual families. The first group departed from Odessa in September 1881. Throughout the 1880s, there were 26 colonies in eight states: Louisiana, South Dakota, Kansas, Oregon, New York, Michigan, Colorado, and Arkansas. Eventually the majority of Am Olam colonies divided land into private property holdings rather than communal ownership. When owned communally, the land was collectively owned but divided into sections farmed by individuals.

=== Louisiana ===
The first Am Olam settlers, a group of twenty-five families from Elizavetgrad, arrived in New York on November 6, 1881. They settled the first Am Olam colony in Sicily Island, Louisiana which failed a year later when all of their homes and livestock were swept away in a flood. Many of the colonists from the failed Sicily Island colony moved on to Arkansas and Kansas to set up colonies there.

=== South Dakota ===
Many of the families that were part of the colony that failed in Louisiana moved on to South Dakota and founded the first settlement there, called Cremieux. Cremieux was less economically communal than some other Am Olam settlements: there was private land ownership but some financial sharing of the colony's agricultural corporation. Decision-making processes were cooperative: they needed a two-thirds majority to approve commercial decisions. Harsh environmental conditions, a fourteen-mile distance to the closest railroad, and widespread lack of agricultural experience led to the economic failure of the colony and foreclosure of most homes in Cremieux by 1885.

Also in South Dakota, The Bethlehem Yehudah colony employed different strategies than the Cremieux colony. Instead of individual families working their own plots of land, Bethlehem Yehudah was made up of only young, single men and they were more socialist minded, working all of their land communally. A year and a half later, in an attempt to combat economic challenges, they privatized their land, but the colony still failed shortly after.

=== Kansas ===
Inspired by Sholem, an agricultural colony that began in New York in 1837 and lasted for about a decade, many of the Jews that arrived in the 1880s moved further West, in search of empty land. The first colony founded in Kansas was named Beersheba. It was founded in 1882 in Hodgeman County in Southwestern Kansas by twenty-four families of Russian Jews. They broke ground and built sod homes and a sod synagogue.

Another colony, named Montefiore, was founded by fifteen families in Pratt County in 1884. Due to intense drought in its first two years, most of the residents left and moved to New Jersey. The most successful community in Kansas, named Lasker, was founded in 1885 and grew to a population of 200 by 1887. However, it also succumbed to drought by 1891.

=== New Jersey ===
In 1882, Am Olam members created the Alliance, New Jersey colony and named it after Alliance Israélite Universelle, who purchased the land. The colony was originally settled by 43 Jewish families who were fleeing pogroms and antisemitism in the Russian Empire. Because Alliance had a train stop, fertile soil and a sewing factory, it was more successful than most others. Some of the original Am Olam founding families still own land in the area. Other former Jewish agricultural colonies in south New Jersey include Vineland, New Jersey and Rosenhayn, New Jersey.

=== Oregon ===
Group Photo of the New Odessa Community

One of the most well-known Am Olam colonies, named New Odessa, was in Oregon. Founded in Douglas County in 1882, it managed to survive until 1887. The New Odessa colony centered socialist ideology, sharing ownership of the land, and attempted to enact gender equality. Unlike some other Am Olam colonies that were based in Orthodox Jewish philosophy, New Odessa was a secular colony, based on democratic living and equality of the sexes. Their motto was "one for all and all for one."

=== Other States ===
Less is known about Am Olam colonies in other states, and the line between a colony and just a few immigrant families farming together in a place is often blurred.

== Common challenges faced by Am Olam communes ==
The Homestead Act of 1862 granted American citizens 160 acres of public land for a low price if they farmed and set up a homestead. Thus, by the time Jewish Am Olam settlers arrived in the 1880s, much of the desirable land had already been claimed. The land that was left was far from railroads, making it challenging for a farm to make a profit by selling its products. Am Olam colonies in the Midwest also suffered from: scarcity of wood, needing to dig deep wells to reach water, buffalo grass sod making it challenging to "break the land" to open up the soil underneath, and farms having soils low in nitrogen. Weather conditions were generally harsh, with droughts, blizzards, bitter cold, and tornadoes. For instance, the Great Blizzard of 1886 killed 100 people and 100,000 cattle in Western Kansas. Additionally, most of the Jews that were part of Am Olam communities did not have any farming experience. In Europe, Russian Jews had been confined to the Pale of Settlement and were allowed limited access to land, forcing most of them to be artisans, craftsmen, or traders, inhibiting their getting farm experience.

== See also ==
- Kibbutz, a type of cooperative agricultural community created by Zionist Jews in Palestine, later in Israel
- Moshav, a similar type of community, but with less of a collective administration system than the kibbutz
- Roosevelt, New Jersey: Visions of Utopia: 1983 documentary about a 1930s socialist Jewish farming community
