= Alliance Colony =

Jewish agricultural community founded in 1982

Coordinates: 39.493°N 75.080°W

The Alliance Colony was a Jewish agricultural community that was founded on May 10, 1882, in Pittsgrove Township, in Salem County, New Jersey, United States. It was named after the Alliance Israélite Universelle of Paris and was funded by the Hebrew Emigrant Aid Society of New York and Philadelphia and The Baron De Hirsch Fund. In the early 1970s, the community's Jewish population reached a peak of 12, 000 residents.

== History ==
Following the assassination of Tsar Alexander II, numerous pogroms targeting Russian Jews in Russia and the Pale of Settlement prompted many families to emigrate. Many began their lives in America in tenements on Manhattan's Lower East Side. As the numbers of Jewish people in America increased there was a strong desire to leave the confinement and crowded conditions in the cities. Some Jewish thinkers and community leaders proclaimed that recent Jewish immigrants ought "to become tillers of the soil and thus shake off the accusation that we were petty mercenaries living upon the toil of others." They settled in communities across the country, but many wished to continue living in predominately Jewish areas. These immigrants recognized that self-sufficiency would be paramount to their survival, which led them into agriculture. Alliance was founded by a core group of 43 Jewish families, but many more followed and, by the end of the first summer, there were 60-70 families living in the colony. The Jewish farmers sold their produce, such as strawberries and cranberries at produce markets in Philadelphia and New York City. The colony's first synagogue, Eben ha-Ezer, was dedicated in 1888.

The sociological model of the colony and likewise all South Jersey Jewish farming colonies also sought out and encouraged non-Jews to settle in the colony.The model was described by Rabbi Moshe Davis as "the continuing quest of the Jewish people to find a more perfect union with lands and peoples of expanding freedom."

The land that was settled consisted of 15 acres (61,000 m^{2}) per family on farmland that needed to be cleared and farmed. The immigrant colony members had little knowledge of agriculture and had difficulty farming the sandy South Jersey soil but received training from their neighbors. The HIAS paid workers weekly during the period in which land was cleared. Initially, Alliance was also supported by local politicians who arranged for 1,000+ army tents for the community for shelter until permanent housing could be built. During the period, Jewish farming colonies were founded in Louisiana, Utah and the Dakotas. In South Carolina, a community Yiddish‑speaking Jewish socialist immigrants established Happyville.

The Alliance Colony residents initially lived in tents provided by the United States Government. These were soon replaced by 8-by-14-foot cubicles for each pioneer family. Benyamin Cohen described the progress at the Colony in an article for The Forward: "What began as tents and barracks grew into a rural Jewish community of hundreds of families: homes, vineyards, chicken farms, a school, three synagogues, and a mikvah. The colonists built a tobacco factory that failed, and a button factory that didn’t. Reinvention wasn’t strategy so much as muscle memory". A library was also established, as well as a group of amateur playera. Boris Thomashefsky visiting theatre company fitted out the bare stage and ultimately donated the curtain and scenery to the colony.

At the 50th‑anniversary celebration in 1932, more than 600 descendants and former residents gathered from across the United States to revisit the settlement and honour both the surviving pioneers and those who had died.

Holocaust survivors began settling after the Second World War and established chicken farms.This contributed to a population increase, with the Jewish population peaking at 12, 000 residents in the early 1970s.

However, the 1970s also saw a major shift of working-age Jewish adults to the cities, eventually leading to a decline in population.

In 1990, a Holocaust memorial was constructed in the colony's cemetery. It is engraved with the names of camps such as Auschwitz, Buchenwald, Dachau and Treblinka. Irving and Esther Raab, survivors, who settled at the colony to establish a kosher poultry business set up the memorial.

== Community makeup ==
The Alliance Colony was primarily a farming community but also included various craftsmen, such as cabinetmaking, blacksmithing and masonry. Eventually a clothing factory was established, which is still in existence.

In 1901, there were 151 adults at Alliance and 345 children, 27 of whom were married. There were 78 farms worth $135,250. The community owned 1,886 acres (7.63 km^{2}) of land, of which 1,354 were cleared.

Alliance focused on education, building several well recognized schools as well as four synagogues--at least one of which still is in operation--as well as a Jewish cemetery.

== Today ==
The former colony now functions primarily as a heritage and agricultural tourism site.

Remnants of Alliance Colony exist today, the cemetery is still in use for the Jewish communities in Cumberland and Salem Counties and is well maintained, the home of Moses Bayuk, the founder of the colony is still standing and there are plans to turn the property into a cultural center and museum. The earliest graves mark the resting places of the original settlers who first worked the land, while later burials belong to Holocaust survivors who came after the war and sought to rebuild their lives there.

The last known survivor of the Alliance Colony, Lillian Greenblatt Braun, celebrated her 100th birthday in 2005. She died on October 20, 2015, aged 110. The Jewish Federation of Cumberland, Gloucester & Salem Counties is currently working on building a Jewish Heritage Center on the property to commemorate the community's history, the history of Jews in America and their participation in farming.

In 2017, William Levin, a descendant of Moses Bayuk, and his wife Malya Levin (daughter of Arthur Kurzweil), publicly launched the Alliance Community Reboot project (also known as ACRe), in an effort to renew the agricultural life of the old Alliance Colony. They began a collaboration with local Jewish farmer Nathan Kleinman of the Experimental Farm Network, who planted various heritage grains and other heirloom plants on one of the fields owned by the Levins, close to the old Tifereth Israel synagogue. They plan to expand operations over the coming years. The couple invested their savings to purchase the 85 acres in the former Alliance Colony that William’s extended family had retained over the generations. They also collaborated with local growers, sought grant funding, and offered educational programs on the history of Jewish agriculture. They converted the mid-century home of Levin's grandparents into kosher tourist accommodation.

Descendants gradually began coming back for annual Alliance reunions, with attendance increasing each year. Younger Jews from urban areas also started visiting, drawn by an interest in Jewish agricultural traditions. The historic Tifereth Israel synagogue, built in vernacular style in 1889 and disused in 1996, and one of the few surviving 19th-century synagogues in the United States, had been in continuous use for High Holiday service since 1886 until 1996. Thanks largely to the efforts of the couple, the synagogue has experienced a modest revival and now holds monthly Shabbat gatherings.

In 2023, Alliance, a feature-length documentary about the colony was released. It was directed by Susan Donnelly, a descendant of a colony family. As result of the Levins’ work and renewed interest sparked by the documentary, the colony is experiencing an increase in organised tours, catering to school groups, descendants and the Mennonite community.

== Notable people ==
People who were born in, residents of, or otherwise closely associated with the Alliance Colony include:

- Stanley Brotman (1924–2014), a United States district judge of the United States District Court for the District of New Jersey.
- Joseph B. Perskie (1885–1957), Associate Justice of the New Jersey Supreme Court from 1933 to 1947.
- George Seldes (1890–1995), an American investigative journalist, foreign correspondent, editor, author, and media critic best known for the publication of the newsletter In Fact from 1940 to 1950.
- Gilbert Seldes (1893–1970), an American writer and cultural critic.

== See also ==
- Happyville, South Carolina
- Yaazor
