= Glendale, Oregon =

- City
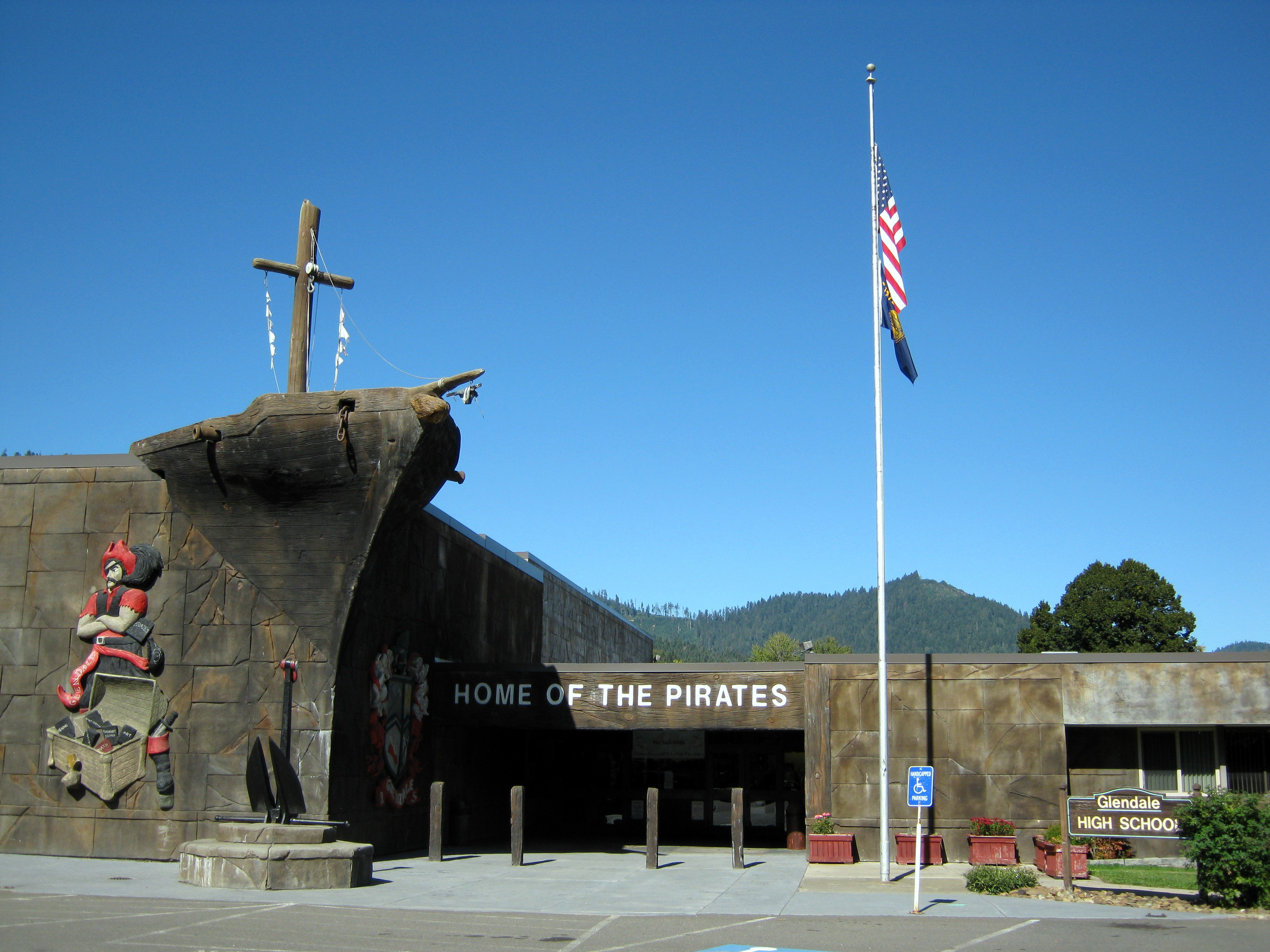
- Glendale Jr/Sr High School

- Location in Oregon
- Coordinates: 42°44′17″N 123°25′46″W
- Country: United States
- State: Oregon
- County: Douglas
- Incorporated: 1901

Government
  - Mayor: Crystal Martin

Area
  - Total: 0.39 sq mi (1.02 km^{2})
  - Land: 0.39 sq mi (1.02 km^{2})
  - Water: 0 sq mi (0.00 km^{2})
- Elevation: 1,431 ft (436 m)

Population (2020)
  - Total: 858
  - Density: 2,187.4/sq mi (844.57/km^{2})
- Time zone: UTC-8 (Pacific)
  - Summer (DST): UTC-7 (Pacific)
- ZIP code: 97442
- Area code: 541
- FIPS code: 41-29350
- GNIS feature ID: 2410599
- Website: www.cityofglendaleor.com

Glendale is a city in Douglas County, Oregon, United States. As of the 2020 census, Glendale had a population of 858.

== History ==
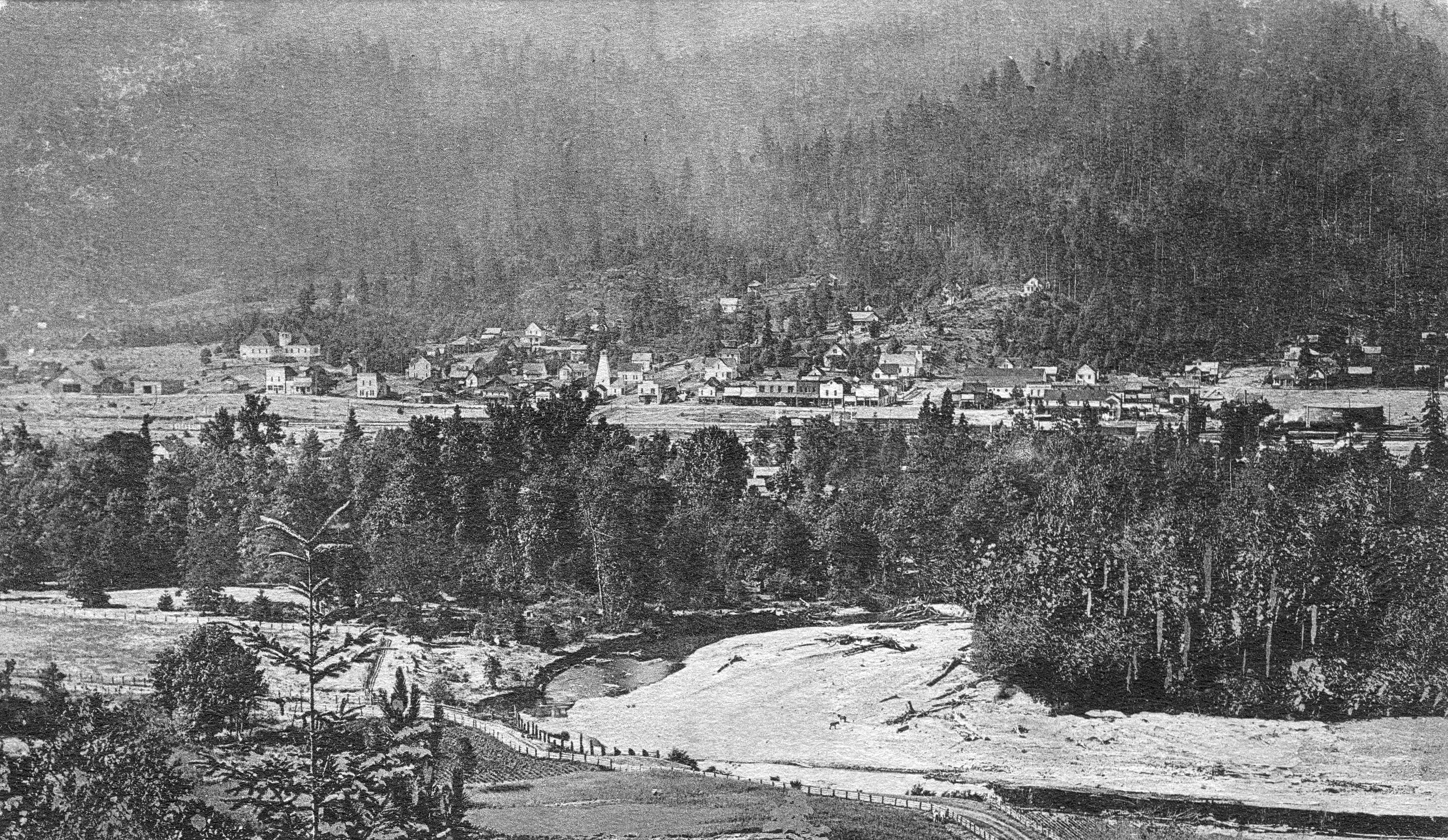
A historic view of Glendale

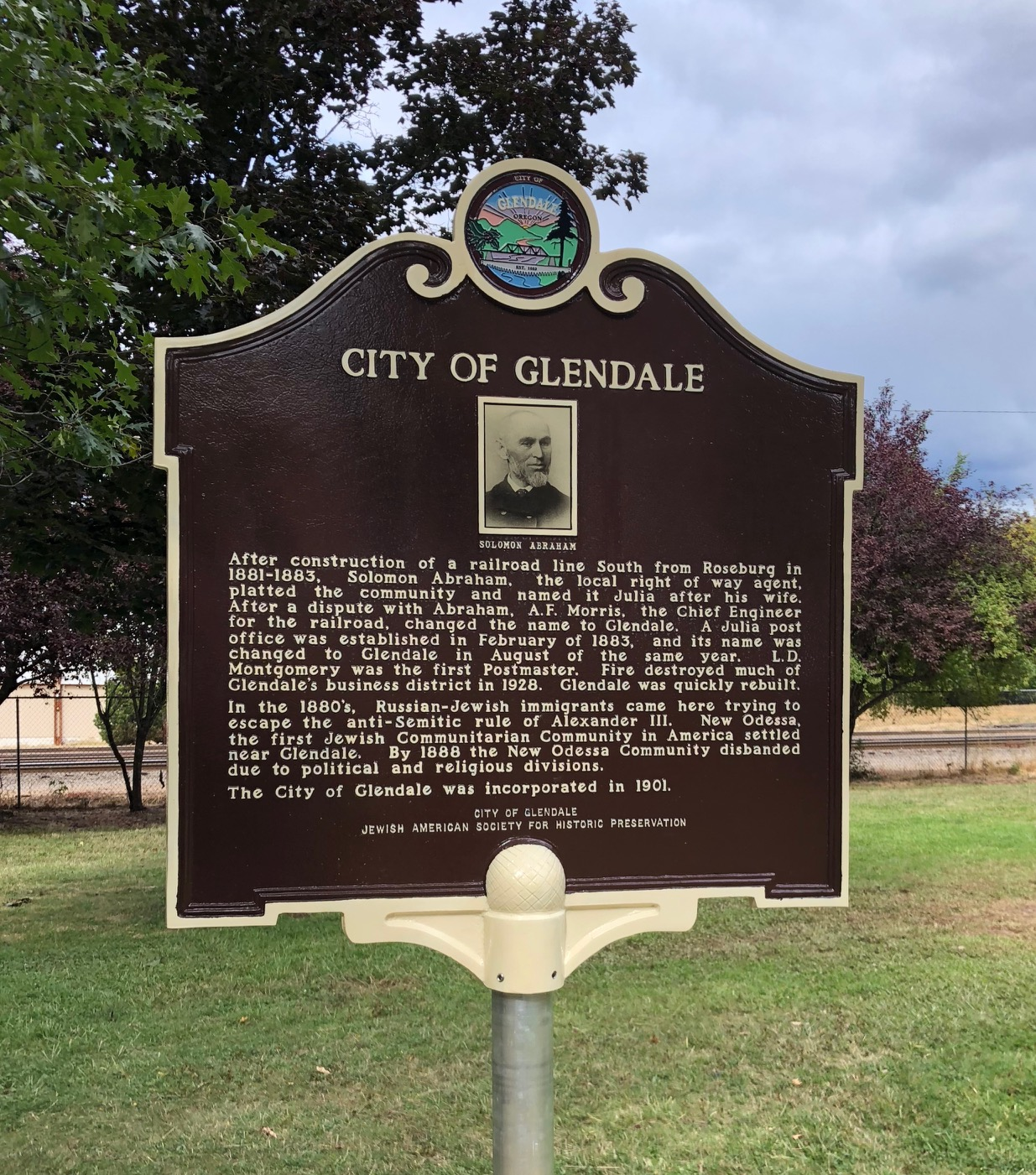
Historic Marker donated by the Jewish American Society for Historic Preservation in city park

After construction of a railroad line south from Roseburg in 1881–83, Solomon Abraham, the local right-of-way agent, platted the community and named it "Julia" after his wife. After a dispute with Abraham, A. F. Morris, the chief engineer for the railroad, changed the name to "Glendale". A Julia post office was established in February 1883, and its name was changed to Glendale in August of the same year. L. D. Montgomery was the first postmaster. Fire destroyed much of Glendale's business district in 1928. Glendale was quickly rebuilt.

In the 1880s, Russian-Jewish immigrants came here trying to escape the anti-Semitic rule of Alexander III. New Odessa, the first Jewish Communitarian Community in America settled near Glendale. By 1888 the New Odessa Community disbanded due to political and religious division.

Glendale was incorporated in 1901.

== Geography ==
According to the United States Census Bureau, the city has a total area of 0.40 square miles (1.04 km^{2}), all of it land.

== Demographics ==
Historical population
| Census | Pop. | Note | %± |
|---|---|---|---|
| 1910 | 646 | | — |
| 1920 | 548 | | −15.2% |
| 1930 | 516 | | −5.8% |
| 1940 | 557 | | 7.9% |
| 1950 | 871 | | 56.4% |
| 1960 | 748 | | −14.1% |
| 1970 | 709 | | −5.2% |
| 1980 | 712 | | 0.4% |
| 1990 | 707 | | −0.7% |
| 2000 | 855 | | 20.9% |
| 2010 | 874 | | 2.2% |
| 2020 | 858 | | −1.8% |
U.S. Decennial Census

=== 2020 census ===
As of the 2020 census, Glendale had a population of 858. The median age was 37.4 years, 25.9% of residents were under the age of 18, and 21.1% were 65 years of age or older. For every 100 females there were 107.2 males, and for every 100 females age 18 and over there were 105.8 males age 18 and over.

0% of residents lived in urban areas, while 100.0% lived in rural areas.

There were 342 households in Glendale, of which 33.9% had children under the age of 18 living with them. Of all households, 38.3% were married-couple households, 25.7% had a male householder with no spouse or partner present, and 25.4% had a female householder with no spouse or partner present. About 29.6% of all households were made up of individuals, and 14.9% had someone living alone who was 65 years of age or older.

There were 383 housing units, of which 10.7% were vacant. Among occupied housing units, 54.7% were owner-occupied and 45.3% were renter-occupied. The homeowner vacancy rate was 4.0% and the rental vacancy rate was 3.6%.

Racial composition as of the 2020 census
| Race | Number | Percent |
|---|---|---|
| White | 714 | 83.2% |
| Black or African American | 3 | 0.3% |
| American Indian and Alaska Native | 19 | 2.2% |
| Asian | 2 | 0.2% |
| Native Hawaiian and Other Pacific Islander | 1 | 0.1% |
| Some other race | 27 | 3.1% |
| Two or more races | 92 | 10.7% |
| Hispanic or Latino (of any race) | 76 | 8.9% |

=== 2010 census ===
As of the census of 2010, there were 874 people, 325 households, and 229 families living in the city. The population density was 2,185.0 inhabitants per square mile (843.6/km^{2}). There were 391 housing units at an average density of 977.5 per square mile (377.4/km^{2}). The racial makeup of the city was 89.8% White, 0.3% African American, 1.4% Native American, 0.1% Asian, 3.8% from other races, and 4.6% from two or more races. Hispanic or Latino of any race were 9.4% of the population.

There were 325 households, of which 38.2% had children under the age of 18 living with them, 51.4% were married couples living together, 11.1% had a female householder with no husband present, 8.0% had a male householder with no wife present, and 29.5% were non-families. 22.5% of all households were made up of individuals, and 9.6% had someone living alone who was 65 years of age or older. The average household size was 2.69 and the average family size was 3.14.

The median age in the city was 35.8 years. 29.4% of residents were under the age of 18; 8% were between the ages of 18 and 24; 24.5% were from 25 to 44; 23.9% were from 45 to 64; and 14.3% were 65 years of age or older. The gender makeup of the city was 50.8% male and 49.2% female.

=== 2000 census ===
As of the census of 2000, there were 855 people, 311 households, and 224 families living in the city. The population density was 2,138.4 inhabitants per square mile (825.6/km^{2}). There were 355 housing units at an average density of 887.9 per square mile (342.8/km^{2}). The racial makeup of the city was 89.82% White, 2.92% Native American, 1.05% Asian, 0.12% Pacific Islander, 2.34% from other races, and 3.74% from two or more races. Hispanic or Latino of any race were 8.54% of the population.

There were 311 households, out of which 40.5% had children under the age of 18 living with them, 49.8% were married couples living together, 12.9% had a female householder with no husband present, and 27.7% were non-families. 23.2% of all households were made up of individuals, and 7.1% had someone living alone who was 65 years of age or older. The average household size was 2.75 and the average family size was 3.23.

In the city, the population was spread out, with 35.6% under the age of 18, 7.8% from 18 to 24, 26.9% from 25 to 44, 20.8% from 45 to 64, and 8.9% who were 65 years of age or older. The median age was 31 years. For every 100 females, there were 97.5 males. For every 100 females age 18 and over, there were 96.8 males.

The median income for a household in the city was $27,625, and the median income for a family was $30,278. Males had a median income of $34,167 versus $17,143 for females. The per capita income for the city was $13,067. About 19.4% of families and 22.4% of the population were below the poverty line, including 26.6% of those under age 18 and 15.2% of those age 65 or over.

== See also ==
- New Odessa
- Swanson Group Aviation
