= Montmorenci, South Carolina =

- Unincorporated community
- Location within South Carolina Location within the United States
- Coordinates: 33°31′41″N 81°38′11″W
- Country: United States
- State: South Carolina
- County: Aiken
- Elevation: 482 ft (147 m)
- Time zone: UTC-5 (Eastern (EST))
  - Summer (DST): UTC-4 (EDT)
- ZIP code: 29839
- Area codes: 803 and 839
- GNIS feature ID: 1246715

Montmorenci is an unincorporated community in Aiken County, South Carolina, United States. The community is located along U.S. Route 78, 5.3 miles (8.5 km) east-southeast of Aiken. Montmorenci has a post office with ZIP code 29839.

== See also ==
- Happyville, South Carolina
