= List of National Historic Landmarks in South Carolina =

List of historical landmarks

This is a List of National Historic Landmarks in South Carolina, United States. The United States' National Historic Landmark (NHL) program is operated under the auspices of the National Park Service, and recognizes buildings, sites, structures, districts, and objects according to a list of criteria of national significance. There are 76 NHLs in South Carolina and 3 additional National Park Service-administered areas of primarily historic importance.

Architects whose work is recognized by two or more separate NHLs in the state are:

- Robert Mills (8 sites),
- Edward Brickell White (4 sites),
- Gabriel Manigault (3 sites), and
- William Wallace Anderson (2 sites).

These tallies do not include any buildings that are contributing properties within historic districts unless they are also individually designated as NHLs.

There are five places listed for their association with artists and writers.

There are four World War II-era museum ships; all are located at Patriot's Point in Charleston Harbor.

== Key ==
	National Historic Landmark
^{†}	National Historic Landmark District
^{#}	National Historic Site, National Historical Park, National Memorial, or National Monument
^{*}	Delisted Landmark

== Current NHLs in South Carolina ==
The 76 NHLs in South Carolina are distributed across 16 of the 46 counties in the state; 42 of the 76 are located in Charleston County.

	Landmark name	Image	Date designated	Location	County	Description
1^{†}	William Aiken House and Associated Railroad Structures	William Aiken House and Associated Railroad Structures	November 4, 1963 (#66000698)	Charleston; 32°47′21″N 79°56′15″W	Charleston	Structures of South Carolina Canal and Railroad Company, the longest operating railroad in the world in 1833, and home of founder William Aiken
2^{†}	Atalaya and Brookgreen Gardens	Atalaya and Brookgreen Gardens	October 5, 1992 (#84002045)	Murrells Inlet; 33°30′50″N 79°05′07″W	Georgetown	Landmark combining Atalaya and portions of Brookgreen Gardens associated with artist Anna Hyatt Huntington
3^{†}	Beaufort Historic District	Beaufort Historic District	November 7, 1973 (#69000159)	Beaufort; 32°26′08″N 80°40′04″W	Beaufort	
4	Bethesda Presbyterian Church	Bethesda Presbyterian Church	February 4, 1985 (#85003258)	Camden; 34°14′48″N 80°36′19″W	Kershaw	Church designed by Robert Mills
5	William Blacklock House	William Blacklock House	November 7, 1973 (#73001681)	Charleston; 32°46′59″N 79°56′22″W	Charleston	Adamesque house, possibly designed by Gabriel Manigault
6	Borough House	Borough House	June 7, 1988 (#72001224)	Stateburg; 33°57′14″N 80°32′16″W	Sumter	"The oldest and largest collection of 'high style' pise de terre (rammed earth) buildings in the United States". Across the road from Church of the Holy Cross
7	Miles Brewton House	Miles Brewton House	October 9, 1960 (#66000699)	Charleston; 32°46′20″N 79°55′56″W	Charleston	Fine examples of a "double house" (having four main rooms per floor) in Charleston
8	Robert Brewton House	Robert Brewton House	October 9, 1960 (#66000700)	Charleston; 32°46′28″N 79°55′45″W	Charleston	Charleston's oldest dated "single" house (one room wide, with the narrow end toward the street, and entry centered in long side)
9	Brick House Ruins	Brick House Ruins	April 15, 1970 (#70000580)	Edisto Island; 32°35′59″N 80°19′32″W	Charleston	Ruins of a plantation house that burned in 1929
10	Burt-Stark Mansion	Burt-Stark Mansion	October 5, 1992 (#70000559)	Abbeville; 34°10′49″N 82°22′55″W	Abbeville	Where the American Civil War ended.
11	Camden Battlefield	Camden Battlefield	January 20, 1961 (#66000707)	Camden; 34°20′47″N 80°36′27″W	Kershaw	Site of Battle of Camden, British victory in 1780
12	Chapelle Administration Building	Chapelle Administration Building	December 8, 1976 (#76001710)	Columbia; 34°00′37″N 81°01′15″W	Richland	Allen University building designed by John A. Lankford, "dean of black architecture"
13	Charlesfort-Santa Elena Site	Charlesfort-Santa Elena Site	January 3, 2001 (#74001822)	Parris Island; 32°18′23″N 80°40′32″W	Beaufort	Archeological site of French fort built in 1562 and Spanish forts built in 1566 and after.
14	Charleston Cigar Factory	Charleston Cigar Factory	December 13, 2024 (#100011360)	701 East Bay St. 32°47′52″N 79°56′05″W	Charleston	
15^{†}	Charleston Historic District	Charleston Historic District	October 9, 1960 (#78002497)	Charleston; 32°47′08″N 79°56′13″W	Charleston	Historic district including 81 contributing properties and 700 others.
16	Church of the Holy Cross	Church of the Holy Cross	November 7, 1973 (#73001732)	Stateburg; 33°57′39″N 80°31′55″W	Sumter	Gothic Revival Church constructed of rammed earth in 1852. Across the road from Borough House
17	Coker Experimental Farms	Coker Experimental Farms	July 19, 1964 (#66000706)	Hartsville; 34°21′47″N 80°03′35″W	Darlington	Site of crop-improvement experiments that "played a great role in the agricultural revolution of the South"
18	College of Charleston	College of Charleston	November 11, 1971 (#71000748)	Charleston; 32°47′03″N 79°56′17″W	Charleston	Historic and attractive campus center; Randolph Hall, Towell Library, and Gate Lodge completed by 1856, designed by William Strickland, Edward Brickell White, and George E. Walker
19	Drayton Hall	Drayton Hall	October 9, 1960 (#66000701)	Charleston; 32°52′15″N 80°04′35″W	Charleston	Plantation house built in 1742 of Palladian architectural style
20	Exchange and Provost	Exchange and Provost	November 7, 1973 (#69000160)	Charleston; 32°46′37″N 79°55′37″W	Charleston	Variously a customhouse, mercantile exchange, military prison and barracks, post office, and meeting place of the 1790 State Legislature
21	Farmers' and Exchange Bank	Farmers' and Exchange Bank	November 7, 1973 (#73001685)	Charleston; 32°46′39″N 79°55′37″W	Charleston	A unique Moorish-style bank building built in 1854
22	Fig Island		March 29, 2007 (#70000585)	Charleston; 32°34′13″N 80°12′55″W	Charleston	Archaeological site that is "one of the most complex shell-ring sites" in the United States
23	Fireproof Building	Fireproof Building	November 7, 1969 (#69000161)	Charleston; 32°46′37″N 79°55′52″W	Charleston	Designed by Robert Mills to be the most fireproof building in America; now the South Carolina Historical Society building.
24	First Baptist Church	First Baptist Church	November 7, 1973 (#71000800)	Columbia; 34°00′21″N 81°02′00″W	Richland	Where the American Civil War started, with the secession of South Carolina from the Union.
25	Fort Hill (John C. Calhoun House)	Fort Hill (John C. Calhoun House)	December 19, 1960 (#66000708)	Clemson; 34°40′34″N 82°50′21″W	Pickens	Home of John C. Calhoun, now within Clemson University campus.
26	William Gibbes House	William Gibbes House	April 15, 1970 (#70000575)	Charleston; 32°46′15″N 79°56′04″W	Charleston	Adamesque style home with a beautiful ballroom, and exceptional wrought iron work and marble steps in front
27^{†}	Graniteville Historic District	Graniteville Historic District	June 2, 1978 (#78002491)	Graniteville; 33°34′01″N 81°48′30″W	Aiken	Textile mill town with Gothic revival church and carpenter gothic homes
28	Hampton Plantation	Hampton Plantation	April 15, 1970 (#70000582)	McClellanville; 33°11′54″N 79°26′16″W	Charleston	"South Carolina's finest example of a large two-and-a-half frame Georgian plantation house"
29	Dubose Heyward House	Dubose Heyward House	November 11, 1971 (#71000749)	Charleston; 32°46′29″N 79°55′45″W	Charleston	Home of Dubose Heyward, author of the novel Porgy.
30	Heyward-Washington House	Heyward-Washington House	April 15, 1970 (#70000576)	Charleston; 32°46′31″N 79°55′45″W	Charleston	Residence of George Washington during his 1792 visit to Charleston
31	Hibernian Hall	Hibernian Hall	November 7, 1973 (#73001686)	Charleston; 32°46′39″N 79°55′52″W	Charleston	
32	Hopsewee	Hopsewee	November 11, 1971 (#71000782)	Georgetown; 33°12′38″N 79°23′05″W	Georgetown	Plantation mansion built in 1749; the birthplace of Thomas Lynch Jr.
33	Huguenot Church	Huguenot Church	November 7, 1973 (#73001687)	Charleston; 32°46′41″N 79°55′46″W	Charleston	Gothic Revival church built in 1844; designed by architect E. B. White
34	Kahal Kadosh Beth Elohim	Kahal Kadosh Beth Elohim	June 19, 1980 (#78002499)	Charleston; 32°46′55″N 79°55′59″W	Charleston	Greek revival building from 1840; second oldest synagogue in continuous use in the United States
35	USS Laffey	USS Laffey	January 14, 1986 (#83002189)	Mount Pleasant; 32°47′16″N 79°54′28″W	Charleston	A destroyer
36	Lancaster County Courthouse	Lancaster County Courthouse	November 7, 1973 (#71000788)	Lancaster; 34°43′17″N 80°46′17″W	Lancaster	Courthouse in continuous use since 1828; designed by Robert Mills
37	Lancaster County Jail	Lancaster County Jail	November 7, 1973 (#71000789)	Lancaster; 34°43′06″N 80°46′17″W	Lancaster	Former jail building built in 1823, virtually unaltered work of Robert Mills, reflecting innovative changes in jail design he promoted
38	Joseph Manigault House	Joseph Manigault House	November 7, 1973 (#73001688)	Charleston; 32°47′19″N 79°56′08″W	Charleston	Home designed by Gabriel Manigault for his brother
39	Market Hall and Sheds	Market Hall and Sheds	November 7, 1973 (#73001689)	Charleston; 32°46′51″N 79°55′53″W	Charleston	Greek Revival meat market with two blocks of sheds where vegetables, fish, etc., were sold
40	Marshlands	Marshlands	November 7, 1973 (#73001674)	Beaufort; 32°26′01″N 80°39′57″W	Beaufort	Home of Dr. James Robert Verdier, who discovered a treatment for yellow fever
41	Middleburg Plantation	Middleburg Plantation	April 15, 1970 (#70000568)	Huger; 33°04′52″N 79°50′35″W	Berkeley	One of the earliest frame plantation houses in the state
42^{†}	Middleton Place	Middleton Place	November 11, 1971 (#71000770)	Summerville; 32°53′59″N 80°08′12″W	Dorchester	Plantation mansion and ornamental gardens on the Ashley River
43	Millford Plantation	Millford Plantation	November 7, 1973 (#71000808)	Pinewood; 33°44′54″N 80°32′15″W	Sumter	A monumental 2-story Greek Revival mansion built in 1839 and meticulously restored in the early 1990s.
44	Mills Building, South Carolina State Hospital	Mills Building, South Carolina State Hospital	November 7, 1973 (#70000890)	Columbia; 34°00′55″N 81°02′03″W	Richland	Designed by Robert Mills, used from 1827 to 1937; "the oldest building in the country to be used continuously as a mental institution and one of the first mental hospitals built with public funds"
45	Clark Mills Studio	Clark Mills Studio	December 21, 1965 (#66000703)	Charleston; 32°46′36″N 79°55′46″W	Charleston	Studio of self-taught sculptor Clark Mills
46	Robert Mills House	Robert Mills House	November 7, 1973 (#70000595)	Columbia; 34°00′34″N 81°01′45″W	Richland	Home designed by architect Robert Mills
47	Mulberry Plantation	Mulberry Plantation	October 9, 1960 (#66000697)	Moncks Corner; 33°08′31″N 80°01′04″W	Berkeley	Built in 1714 for a Royal governor; one of the earliest plantation homes in the United States
48	Mulberry Plantation (James and Mary Boykin Chesnut House)	Mulberry Plantation (James and Mary Boykin Chesnut House)	February 16, 2000 (#80003673)	Camden; 34°12′24″N 80°35′31″W	Kershaw	Home of Mary Boykin Chesnut and source for her Civil War-time diary describing southern society, "acknowledged as the most important piece of Confederate literature"
49^{#}	Ninety-Six and Star Fort	Ninety-Six and Star Fort	November 7, 1973 (#69000169)	Ninety Six; 34°08′49″N 82°01′28″W	Greenwood	
50	Old Marine Hospital	Old Marine Hospital	November 7, 1973 (#73001690)	Charleston; 32°46′39″N 79°56′15″W	Charleston	Gothic Revival design by Robert Mills built in 1833 to serve sick sailors and other transients
51	Parish House of the Circular Congregational Church	Parish House of the Circular Congregational Church	November 7, 1973 (#73001683)	Charleston; 32°46′45″N 79°55′53″W	Charleston	Parish house designed by Robert Mills
52^{†}	Penn School Historic District	Penn School Historic District	December 2, 1974 (#74001824)	Frogmore; 32°23′18″N 80°34′31″W	Beaufort	School for freed slaves, Gullahs, on St. Helena Island which was occupied by the Union near the outset of the American Civil War
53	Pompion Hill Chapel	Pompion Hill Chapel	April 15, 1970 (#70000567)	Huger; 33°05′12″N 79°50′12″W	Berkeley	Episcopal chapel built in 1763, unaltered
54	Powder Magazine	Powder Magazine	September 27, 1989 (#72001200)	Charleston; 32°46′47″N 79°55′47″W	Charleston	The oldest public building in the city
55	Joseph H. Rainey House	Joseph H. Rainey House	April 20, 1984 (#84003877)	Georgetown; 33°22′07″N 79°17′02″W	Georgetown	Home of the first black U.S. Congressman, Joseph H. Rainey, a former slave
56	Robert Barnwell Rhett House	Robert Barnwell Rhett House	November 7, 1973 (#73001691)	Charleston; 32°47′11″N 79°56′33″W	Charleston	Home of Robert Barnwell Rhett, an extreme secessionist politician, a leading fire-eater at the Nashville Convention of 1850, which failed to endorse his aim of secession
57	Robert William Roper House	Robert William Roper House	November 7, 1973 (#73001692)	Charleston; 32°46′14″N 79°55′42″W	Charleston	
58	Nathaniel Russell House	Nathaniel Russell House	November 7, 1973 (#71000750)	Charleston; 32°46′27″N 79°55′51″W	Charleston	An Adamesque house completed in 1808
59	Edward Rutledge House	Edward Rutledge House	November 11, 1971 (#71000751)	Charleston; 32°46′34″N 79°56′01″W	Charleston	Home of Edward Rutledge, a signer of the Declaration of Independence, and a governor of South Carolina
60	John Rutledge House	John Rutledge House	November 7, 1973 (#71000752)	Charleston; 32°46′34″N 79°56′01″W	Charleston	Home of Gov. John Rutledge, a signer of the U.S. Constitution.
61	St. James Church, Goose Creek	St. James Church, Goose Creek	April 15, 1970 (#70000566)	Goose Creek; 32°58′25″N 80°01′47″W	Berkeley	Episcopal chapel
62	St. James Church, Santee	St. James Church, Santee	April 15, 1970 (#70000581)	Georgetown; 33°10′13″N 79°27′56″W	Charleston	
63	Saint Michael's Episcopal Church	Saint Michael's Episcopal Church	October 9, 1960 (#66000704)	Charleston; 32°46′33″N 79°55′51″W	Charleston	Built in 1750s, Charleston's oldest church building
64	St. Philip's Episcopal Church	St. Philip's Episcopal Church	November 7, 1973 (#73001695)	Charleston; 32°46′44″N 79°55′46″W	Charleston	Church with E. B. White-designed steeple
65	St. Stephen's Episcopal Church	St. Stephen's Episcopal Church	April 15, 1970 (#70000570)	St. Stephen; 33°24′19″N 79°55′00″W	Berkeley	A small Georgian brick country church with a high gambrel roof.
66	Simmons-Edwards House	Simmons-Edwards House	November 7, 1973 (#71000753)	Charleston; 32°46′22″N 79°56′02″W	Charleston	Known as the "Pineapple Gate House" by locals, referring to finials upon its large brick gates
67	Robert Smalls House	Robert Smalls House	May 30, 1973 (#74001823)	Beaufort; 32°26′07″N 80°40′05″W	Beaufort	Post-Civil War home of U.S. congressman Robert Smalls, a former slave who commandeered a Confederate ship out to Union lines
68^{#}	Snee Farm	Snee Farm	November 7, 1973 (#73001702)	Mount Pleasant; 32°50′46″N 79°49′29″W	Charleston	Home of early South Carolina Governor Charles Pinckney.
69	Snow's Island		December 2, 1974 (#73001708)	Across the Peedee River from Dunham Bluff, near Johnsonville; 33°50′13″N 79°20′28″W	Florence	Revolutionary War era refuge of the "Swamp Fox", Francis Marion
70	South Carolina State House	South Carolina State House	May 11, 1976 (#70000598)	Columbia; 34°00′02″N 81°01′59″W	Richland	This Greek Revival capitol building was completed in 1907, with major renovations in 1959 and 1998.
71	Stono River Slave Rebellion Site	Stono River Slave Rebellion Site	May 30, 1974 (#74001840)	Rantowles; 32°47′08″N 80°08′44″W	Charleston	Beginning point of the earliest slave revolt in the United States.
72	Colonel John Stuart House	Colonel John Stuart House	November 7, 1973 (#70000578)	Charleston; 32°46′28″N 79°56′02″W	Charleston	Home of Colonel John Stuart.
73	Unitarian Church	Unitarian Church	November 7, 1973 (#73001696)	Charleston; 32°46′41″N 79°56′04″W	Charleston	Church built in 1772 and reworked in Gothic style during 1852-1854
74	Denmark Vesey House	Denmark Vesey House	May 11, 1976 (#76001698)	Charleston; 32°46′56″N 79°56′28″W	Charleston	Said to be the home of Denmark Vesey, who was accused of plotting slave rebellion in 1822 and executed
75	Woodlands	Woodlands	November 11, 1971 (#71000742)	Bamberg; 33°17′27″N 80°55′53″W	Bamberg	The primary residence of author William Gilmore Simms, whose main house was burned in 1865; the remaining wing and several outbuildings constitute a literary landmark.
76	USS Yorktown	USS Yorktown	January 14, 1986 (#82001519)	Mount Pleasant; 32°47′20″N 79°54′31″W	Charleston	Famous World War II aircraft carrier

== Historic areas of the National Park System in South Carolina ==
National Historic Sites, National Historic Parks, National Memorials, and certain other areas listed in the National Park system are historic landmarks of national importance that are highly protected already, often before the inauguration of the NHL program in 1960, and are then often not also named NHLs per se. There are five of these in South Carolina. The National Park Service lists these five together with the NHLs in the state, The Charles Pinckney National Historic Site (also known as Snee Farm) and Ninety Six National Historic Site are also NHLs and are listed above. The remaining three are:

	Landmark name	Image	Date established	Location	County	Description
1	Cowpens National Battlefield	Main Entrance to Cowpens National Battlefield	March 4, 1929	Gaffney	Cherokee	Site of Battle of Cowpens in 1781
2	Fort Sumter National Monument	Fort Sumter	April 28, 1948	Charleston	Charleston	First shots of the American Civil War were fired on January 9, 1861, and the Battle of Fort Sumter raged from April 12 to April 13.
3	Kings Mountain National Military Park	Kings Mountain Monument	March 3, 1931	Blacksburg	Cherokee	Site of Battle of Kings Mountain on 7 October 1780

== Former NHLs in South Carolina ==
	Landmark name	Image	Date designated	Date moved or withdrawn	Locality	County	Description
1	NS Savannah	NS Savannah at Patriot's Point in 1990. Ingham appears to right; view may be from Laffey	July 17, 1991	1994	Patriot's Point, Charleston	Charleston	Nuclear-powered merchant cargo and passenger vessel. It was at Patriot's Point from 1982 until 1994, then later moved to Maryland and finally Virginia.
2	Piedmont Number One	1983 NHL photo	June 2, 1978	March 5, 1986	Piedmont	Greenville	A historic Southern textile mill that burned in 1983. Its National Historic Landmark designation was removed on March 5, 1986.
3	USS Clamagore	USS Clamagore, 24 November 2003	June 29, 1989	September 2, 2024	Mount Pleasant	Charleston	Scrapped in 2022.

== See also ==
- National Register of Historic Places listings in South Carolina
- List of National Historic Landmarks by state
- List of National Natural Landmarks in South Carolina
