= William Ellison =

American planter and formerly enslaved person

William Ellison Jr. (April 1790 – December 5, 1861), born April Ellison, was an African-American cotton gin maker, blacksmith and slave owner in South Carolina, and former slave who achieved considerable success as a slaveowner before the American Civil War. He eventually became a major planter and one of the wealthiest property owners in the state. According to the 1860 census (in which his surname was listed as "Ellerson"), throughout his life he owned up to 63 black slaves in South Carolina and Georgia making him one of the most significant slave owners in the region.

He held 63 slaves at his death and more than 900 acres (360 ha) of land. From 1830 to 1865 he and his sons were the only free blacks in Sumter County, South Carolina to own slaves. The county was largely devoted to cotton plantations, and the majority population were slaves.

Ellison and his sons were among a number of successful free people of color in the antebellum years, but Ellison's master had passed on social capital by apprenticing him to learn a valuable artisan trade as a cotton-gin maker, at which Ellison made a success. He took a wife at the age of 21. After buying his own freedom when he was 26, a few years later Ellison purchased his wife and their children, to protect them from sales as slaves. The Act of 1820 made it more difficult for slaveholders to make personal manumissions, but Ellison gained freedom for his sons and a quasi-freedom for his surviving daughter. During the American Civil War, Ellison and his sons supported the Confederate States of America and gave the government substantial donations and aid. A grandson fought in the regular Confederate Army and survived the war.

== Early life and education ==
William Ellison Jr. was named "April" by his master when born into slavery about 1790 on a plantation near Winnsboro, South Carolina. The name indicated the month he was born, which was a common slave-naming practice at the time. In 1800-1802 the man April was documented as owned by William Ellison of Fairfield County, the son of Robert Ellison, a planter.

William Ellison apprenticed young April at age 10 to a cotton gin maker, William McCreight of Winnsboro. This would provide him with a valuable, highly skilled trade to make a living as an adult. Cotton gins were in demand, integral to the profitable processing of short-staple cotton. The invention of the cotton gin at the end of the 18th century led to the widespread cultivation of short-staple cotton across the upland areas of the Deep South, establishing the Black Belt and stimulating widespread changes in land use. Hundreds of thousands of new settlers were attracted to the region, and they created pressure for the federal government to conduct Indian removal throughout the Southeast and what became known as the Deep South. This also resulted in the forced migration of more than one thousand slaves from the Upper South to the Deep South through the domestic slave market, as slaves were sold to develop and labor on the new plantations.

April Ellison completed his apprenticeship after six years and continued to work at the shop as a hired hand. Most of his earnings went to his master, as April was a slave who was "hired out." But, it appears April was allowed to keep a portion of his fees, as he later purchased his freedom from Ellison. It was common practice, according to Black Codes of South Carolina and Louisiana, to pay slaves for any labor performed on Sunday. April continued to learn the variety of complex skills related to cotton-gin making and repair. He also learned blacksmithing.

== Marriage and family ==
At age 21, April took Matilda, a 16-year-old slave woman (born 1795), as his consort (slaves did not have legally recognized marriages). They had a daughter Aliza/Eliza Ann together, born in 1811. Eliza Ann later married James M. Johnson.

April and Matilda had several more children: three sons, Henry (c. 1816 – August 20, 1883), Reuben (c. 1818 – May 1864), and William Jr. (July 19, 1819 – July 24, 1904); and daughters Maria and Mary Elizabeth (June 11, 1824 – September 15, 1852). Note: These are documented as two different women, as Ellison bequeathed Maria money in his will of 1861 (see below), but Mary had already died by then.) Both names were popular for girls in those years.

== Manumissions ==
On June 8, 1816, at the age of 26, April was freed by his master William Ellison (likely his father, as April took his name as a free man). April appeared to have purchased his freedom by money saved from a portion of his earnings. According to the 1800 law, five freemen had to appear with his master in court to attest to April's ability to support himself in freedom. At that time, he took the name "William Ellison, Jr." as aligning himself with the planter family.

It took years for Ellison to buy his wife and children out of slavery. He had to earn the money and also work within state laws that restricted such manumissions. His priority was to free his wife so that their future children were born free. In this slave society, children of slave mothers were considered slaves, regardless of the status of their fathers, according to the principle of partus sequitur ventrem, which had been incorporated into state law since the 17th century, following the model of Virginia.

The manumission laws in South Carolina made it difficult for Ellison and others to free their relatives, especially children. Purchasing them from slaveholders was one step, but under the 1800 law, other free men had to certify that the slave could support himself in freedom. This obviously could not be the case for children. The Act of 1820 prohibited slaveholders from making personal manumissions by deed or court filings; they had to seek permission for each manumission by both houses of the legislature, and the number of manumissions dropped sharply as a result. For many free black people, being forced to hold their relatives as property put them at risk. In hard times, property, including slaves, could be confiscated or put up for forced sale to settle debts of an individual.

After purchasing his daughter Maria from her owner (as she had been born while her mother was still enslaved), Ellison set up a trust with a friend in 1830 to have legal title transferred to him for one dollar. Col. William McCreighton nominally "owned" Maria, but the trust provided for her to live with her father, who could free her if the laws changed to make it easier to achieve. McCreighton kept his part of the trust, and Maria lived as if she were free. As a young woman, she married Henry Jacobs, a free man of color in another county. In the 1850 census, Maria Ellison Jacobs was listed as a free woman of color, although no legal document supported that. In 1861, her father Ellison provided for her to receive $500 in his will.

== Businesses and plantation ==
After gaining his freedom in 1817, Ellison moved to Sumter County, South Carolina, in the High Hills of Santee, where he established himself as a cotton gin maker. This area was rapidly being developed for cotton plantations of short-staple cotton. At first, he paid for the labor of slave artisans who had been "hired out" by their masters. Within two years he purchased two artisan slaves to work in his shop. By 1830 he held four artisan slaves.

By 1840 he owned a total of eight slaves who worked in his cotton gin business. They were both skilled and unskilled, as the latter cut wood from his land for the gins. By the 1850s, he also operated a blacksmith shop with artisan slaves. He advertised his business in the Black River Watchman, the Sumter Southern Whig, and the Camden Gazette.

As cotton prices were high, there was demand for Ellison's services. Planters needed cotton gins to process their cotton profitably, as the machinery was much more efficient than manual labor. Eventually Ellison earned enough to buy land: starting with more than 50 acres (20 ha), by 1850 he had increased his holdings to 386 acres (156 ha), and established his own cotton plantation. By that time, he owned 32 slaves.

The Ellison family joined the Episcopal Church of the Holy Cross in Stateburg. As a mark of his status, on August 6, 1824, William Ellison was the first free person of color to install a family bench on the first floor of the church, which was usually reserved for wealthy white families who could afford to pay for a bench (and donate to the church).

Ellison and his family established a family cemetery on their plantation. Based on transcriptions of the gravestones, his wife and three generations of descendants, including his sons and their wives, were buried on this property. Family burials took place in the early decades of the twentieth century.

In 1852, Ellison bought Keith Hill and Hickory Hill plantations, bringing his total of land holdings to more than 1,000 acres (400 ha). He gave each of his sons part of the properties, as they were all working with him in his business. In 1850 the sons each held slave women who worked as domestic servants for their families.

After the outbreak of the American Civil War, in 1861 Ellison offered labor from his 53 slaves to the Confederate Army. He converted his cotton plantation to mixed crops to supply food to the cause. His sons also supported the Confederacy and tried to enlist, but were refused because of their race. They donated money, and bought Confederate bonds; with defeat, these bonds became worthless and they lost their investments, becoming destitute by the end of the war like many formerly successful whites.

William Ellison's daughter, Eliza Ann's, second marriage was to James M Johnson. Her first marriage was to Willis Buckner, an African American man, and produced one son, John Wilson Buckner (born 1831, the same year as the death of his father). John W Buckner served in the Civil War, Confederate Army, 7th Battalion Nelson's Enfield Rifles Company E South Carolina Infantry and, after the conclusion of the War, was a long time employee of his uncle, Henry Ellison. John W Buckner first married Jane "Jinsy" Pitts in 1856, but later married Sarah Oxendine on June 10, 1861.

At his death, Ellison provided for dividing his property, including over 60 slaves, among his surviving daughter Maria and two surviving sons. He bequeathed $500 to a slave daughter he had sold. There are differing views on who Willis and John Wilson Buckner were married to and their relationship to Ellison. Ellison family lore states that John Wilson Buckner was the grandson of Ellison. On March 27, 1863, John Wilson Buckner, William Ellison's oldest grandson, enlisted in the 1st South Carolina Artillery.

== See also ==
- List of slaves
- List of slave owners
- Black slave owners in the United States
