= Borough House Plantation =

Historic house in South Carolina, United States

- Borough House
- U.S. National Register of Historic Places
- U.S. National Historic Landmark
- U.S. Historic district – Contributing property
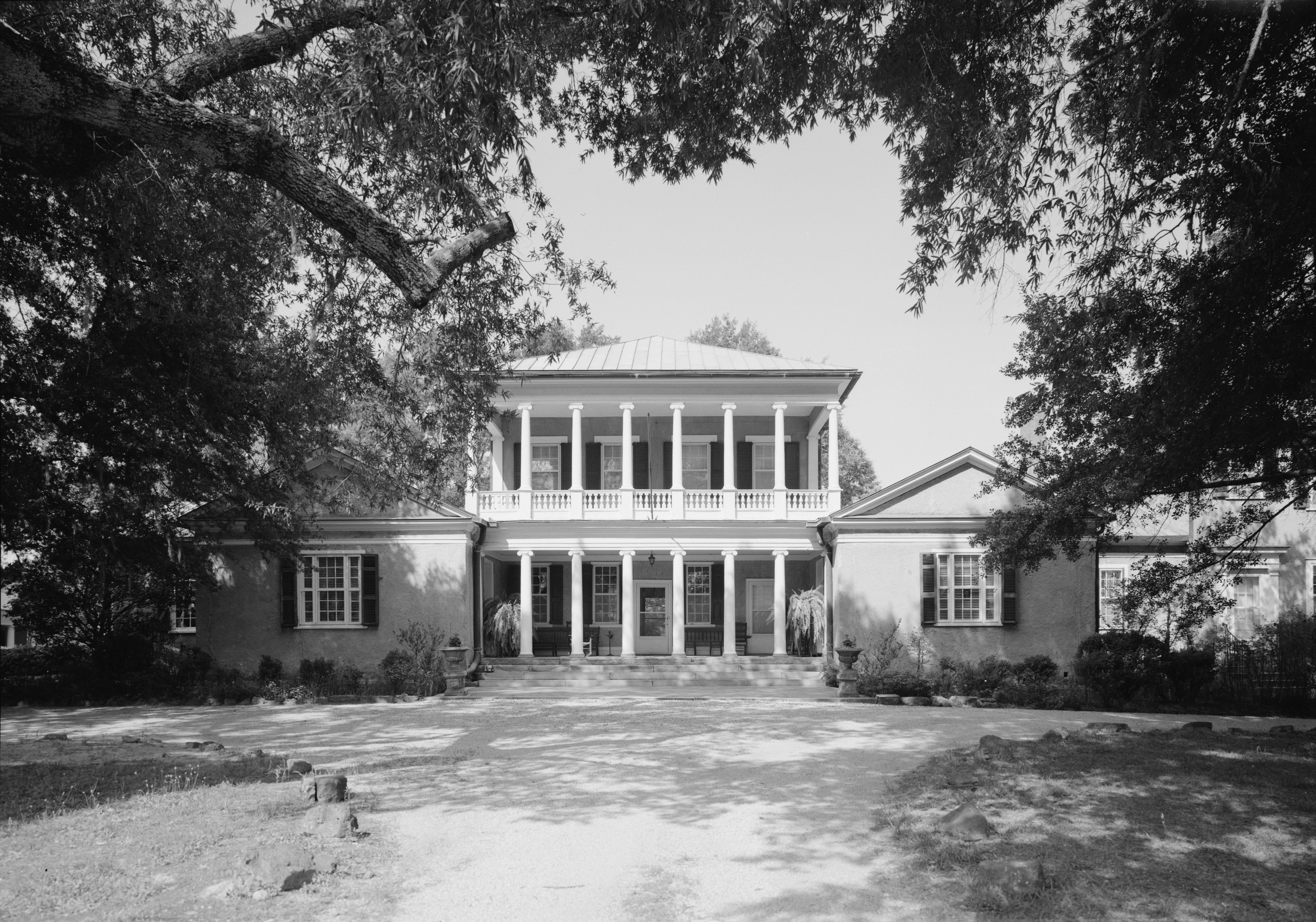

- Location within South Carolina Location within the United States
- Interactive map showing the location of Borough House Plantation
- Location: SC 261, N. Kings Hwy. Stateburg, South Carolina
- Coordinates: 33°57′14″N 80°32′16″W
- Built: 1758, 1820
- Architect: William Wallace Anderson, M.D.
- Architectural style: Greek Revival, Rammed earth
- Part of: Stateburg Historic District (ID71000809)
- NRHP reference No.: 72001224

Significant dates
- Added to NRHP: March 23, 1972
- Designated NHL: March 23, 1972
- Designated CP: February 24, 1971

Borough House Plantation, also known as Borough House, Hillcrest Plantation and Anderson Place, is a historic plantation on South Carolina Highway 261, 0.8 miles (1.3 km) north of its intersection with U.S. Route 76/US Route 378 in Stateburg, in the High Hills of Santee near Sumter, South Carolina. A National Historic Landmark, the plantation is noted as the largest assemblage of high-style pisé (rammed earth) structures in the United States. The main house and six buildings on the plantation were built using this technique, beginning in 1821. The plantation is also notable as the home of Confederate Army General Richard H. Anderson.

== Description and history ==
The original house built in 1758 served at different times during the American Revolution as headquarters for both British General Lord Cornwallis and Continental Army General Nathanael Greene. The second house was built in 1820 of rammed earth by William Wallace Anderson, M.D. It was designed by architect A.C. Jones.

On October 7, 1821, Anderson's wife, the former Mary Jane Mackensie, gave birth at home to their son, Richard H. Anderson. He later served as a Confederate Army general in the American Civil War. Stateburg was originally called Stateborough, as when the town was laid out, Borough House was the only residence in it.

In 1850–1852, Dr. Anderson chaired the committee that built the Church of the Holy Cross of rammed earth across the road from Borough Hall. It was also designed by Jones.

In 1851, Joel Roberts Poinsett, physician, American statesman and botanist (for whom the poinsettia is named), died while visiting Dr. Anderson. He was buried in the churchyard across the road.

On March 23, 1972, Borough Hall plantation was added to the National Register of Historic Places and declared a National Historic Landmark. It is also part of the defined Stateburg Historic District, as is the Church of the Holy Cross.

== See also ==
- List of National Historic Landmarks in South Carolina
- National Register of Historic Places listings in Sumter County, South Carolina
