= Powder Magazine (Charleston, South Carolina) =

- U.S. National Register of Historic Places
- U.S. National Historic Landmark
- U.S. National Historic Landmark District – Contributing property
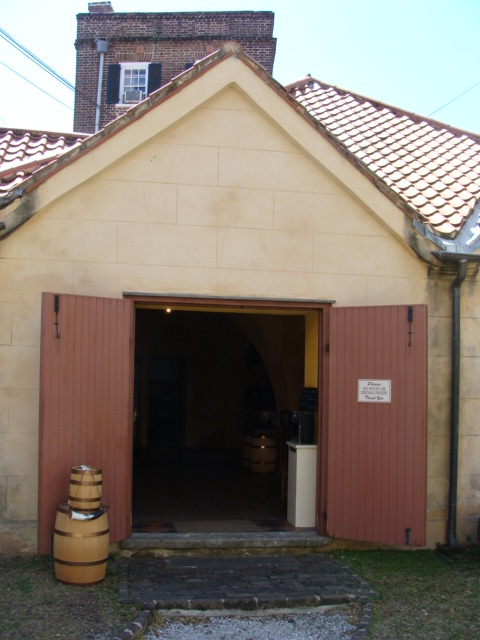

- Location within South Carolina Location within the United States
- Location: 79 Cumberland St., Charleston, South Carolina
- Coordinates: 32°46′46″N 79°55′48″W
- Area: less than one acre
- Built: 1713
- Architectural style: Colonial
- Part of: Charleston Historic District (ID66000964)
- NRHP reference No.: 72001200

Significant dates
- Added to NRHP: January 5, 1972
- Designated NHL: September 27, 1989
- Designated NHLDCP: October 9, 1960

The Powder Magazine is a gunpowder magazine and museum at 79 Cumberland Street in Charleston, South Carolina, USA. Completed in 1713, it is the oldest surviving public building in the former Province of Carolina. It was used as a gunpowder store through the American Revolutionary War, and later saw other uses. The Powder Magazine was declared a National Historic Landmark in 1989. It has been operated as a museum by the National Society of the Colonial Dames of America since the early 1900s. It was designated a National Historic Landmark in 1972.

== Description and history ==
The Charleston Powder Magazine is located in the historic center of Charleston, on the south side of Cumberland Street, between Church and Meeting Streets. It is a single-story square structured, with stuccoed brick walls 32 inches (81 cm) thick, and an original red tile roof that is pyramidal with intersecting gables. Each wall of the building boasts a large arch. The walls get thinner as they reach the top of the arch, changing from three feet thick, near the ground, to just a few inches thick near the top. There are also few doors in the building, so that in the event of an explosion, most of the explosive force would exit through the roof, with the arches acting like funnels. Sand stored in the roof would then smother and put out the fire.

Construction of the building was authorized by the Province of Carolina in 1703, during Queen Anne's War, as part of a series of fortifications, but it was not completed until 1713. It was used as a powder magazine until late in the American Revolutionary War, after which it saw a variety of other uses, including as a wine cellar for Gabriel Manigault. The local chapter of the National Society of the Colonial Dames of America acquired the building in 1902, and now operates it as a museum, which includes historic artifacts and displays about the building during the Colonial and American Revolution periods.

The Powder Magazine closed in February 2025 while the National Society of the Colonial Dames of America in the State of South Carolina had some repairs made and investigated future options for the building. In May 2026, the City of Charleston struck a deal to operate the museum with newly expanded hours and events.

== See also ==
- List of National Historic Landmarks in South Carolina
- National Register of Historic Places listings in Charleston County, South Carolina
