= St. James Episcopal Church (Santee, South Carolina) =

Historic church in South Carolina, United States

- St. James Church, Santee
- U.S. National Register of Historic Places
- U.S. National Historic Landmark
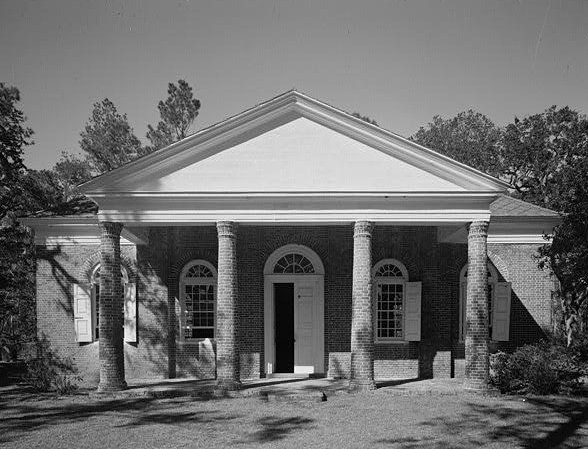
- St. James Episcopal Church, Santee

- Location within South Carolina Location within the United States
- Nearest city: Georgetown, South Carolina
- Coordinates: 33°10′18.8″N 79°27′56.5″W
- Built: 1768
- Architectural style: Georgian
- NRHP reference No.: 70000581

Significant dates
- Added to NRHP: April 15, 1970
- Designated NHL: April 15, 1970

St. James Church, Santee, also known as St. James Episcopal Church, Santee, is a historic church located in a remote portion of Francis Marion National Forest in Charleston County, South Carolina, United States. The church is named for its proximity to the Santee River, and is actually located 79.8 miles (128.4 km) from Santee, South Carolina. Built in 1768, it is a remarkably sophisticated expression of fashionable Georgian architecture in a remote area, and was designated a National Historic Landmark in 1970 for its architectural significance. It is located on the west side of the Old Georgetown Road, several miles north of South Carolina Highway 46 and McClellanville.

== Description and history ==
In 1706 the Province of Carolina formally established the Church of England, which divided what is now South Carolina into six parishes. This parish church was built in 1768. It is rectangular single-story masonry structure, built out of brick and covered by a slate hip roof. The front and rear facades both have a gabled temple-front projection, supported by four round brick columns. The rear projection has had the spaces between the columns bricked up, creating what now serves as the church vestry. The building's windows are round-arched with keystones, with a three-part Palladian window in the eastern wall. The interior retains original woodwork and hardware, including box pews, pulpit, and trim. The pulpit originally stood at the northern end of the long axis, but was apparently moved to the eastern wall sometime in the 18th century.

The church is one of a handful of surviving 18th-century country churches in South Carolina. It is unusual in this group because its styling is particularly sophisticated, reflecting architectural trends in Charleston at the time of its construction. The building was designated a National Historic Landmark in 1970.

== See also ==
- List of National Historic Landmarks in South Carolina
- National Register of Historic Places listings in Charleston County, South Carolina
