= William Wallace Anderson =

American architect and medical doctor

William Wallace Anderson was a medical doctor who graduated from the University of Pennsylvania in 1846 with a Bachelor of Arts and the University of Pennsylvania School of Medicine in 1849. He was also involved in the architecture of rammed earth construction in South Carolina. He was the son of American Revolutionary War hero Richard Anderson and father of Confederate General Richard H. Anderson.

He designed buildings at two sites which are now National Historic Landmarks:

- Borough House Plantation
- Church of the Holy Cross (Stateburg, South Carolina)
