= Brick House Ruins =

Ruin of a 1725 plantation house on Edisto Island, South Carolina

- Brick House Ruin
- U.S. National Register of Historic Places
- U.S. National Historic Landmark
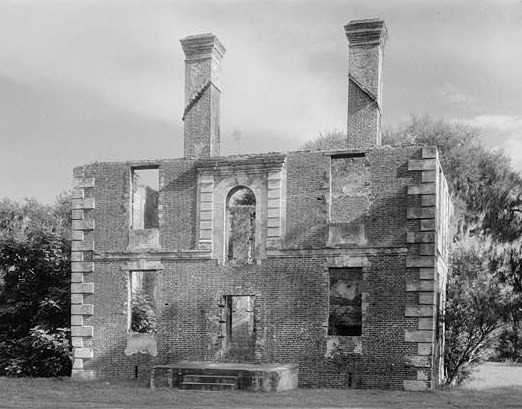
- Paul Hamilton House (Brick House Ruins)

- Location within South Carolina Location within the United States
- Nearest city: Edisto Island, South Carolina
- Coordinates: 32°36′5.3″N 80°19′31.5″W
- Area: 0.3 acres (0.12 ha)
- Built: 1725
- Architectural style: American colonial with French Huguenot influence
- NRHP reference No.: 70000580

Significant dates
- Added to NRHP: April 15, 1970
- Designated NHL: April 15, 1970

The Paul Hamilton House, commonly referred to as the Brick House Ruins, is the ruin of a 1725 plantation house on Edisto Island, South Carolina, that burned in 1929. It was designated a National Historic Landmark in 1970 for the unusual architecture of the surviving walls, which is partly based on French Huguenot architecture of the period.

== Construction ==
The house was constructed about 1725 for Paul Hamilton, a wealthy South Carolina planter, on Edisto Island, one of the Sea Islands in what was then the Province of South Carolina.

The two-story house was constructed with exterior walls of brick imported from Boston, such brick being harder and denser than the local kind. The interior of the home was primarily constructed of locally produced lumber which had been aged seven years. Construction also utilized local gravel and sand brought to the site from the Pon Pon.

== Architecture ==
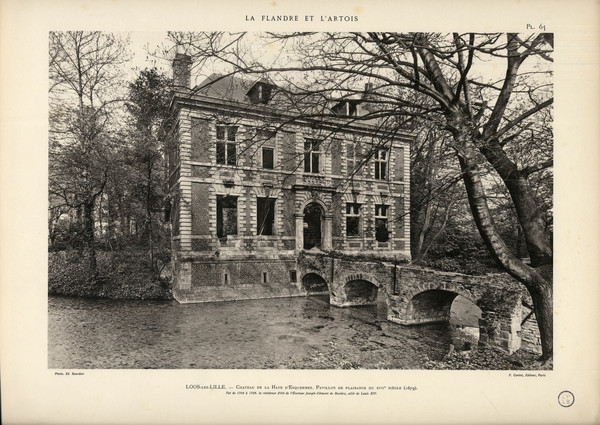
Château de la Haye d'Esquermes

Its architectural design is in keeping with American colonial architecture but exhibits French Huguenot influence. Possibly a simplified copy of the c. 1675 Château de la Haye d'Esquermes near Loos les Lille, France, evidence of the French influence in its architecture is seen through extensive use of stucco ornament and its high-pitched roof.

== History ==
It served as the plantation house for a 300-acre (120 ha) plantation. The estate was acquired in 1798 by the Jenkins family which maintains ownership to this day.

In 1929 the house caught fire, with its wooden portion largely reduced to ashes and only its brick walls with stuccoed quoins and trim remaining. Until that time, it had not been significantly altered.

A drawing of the house's appearance prior to the fire

The ruin was recorded photographically as part of the Historic American Buildings Survey of the National Park Service cataloged at the Library of Congress in both 1936 and 1939.

It was declared a National Historic Landmark and added to the National Register of Historic Places on 15 April 1970.

The South Carolina Department of Archives and History published a summary of the site as a part of South Carolina history. They describe it as an artifact of important early French influence in the Carolinas, considered a "stately and picturesque ruin in its own right." They cite the architecture of the outer walls as being "unique in this country."

== Preservation efforts ==
Following the fire of 1929, some stabilization was performed. Metal supports were used to brace some openings, but their expansion over time has actually damaged some of the material. In addition, the two chimneys (shown in the main photo above) had their top portions removed to prevent damaging the walls in case of collapse. In February 2013, the National Park Service considered the ruins to be in "emergency" condition due to the major cracks and deformation of the south wall. In 2018, the structure was stabilized. Preservation efforts are ongoing.

== See also ==
- List of National Historic Landmarks in South Carolina
- National Register of Historic Places in Charleston County, South Carolina
