= Richard H. Anderson (general) =

Confederate Army general

Lieutenant-General Richard Heron Anderson
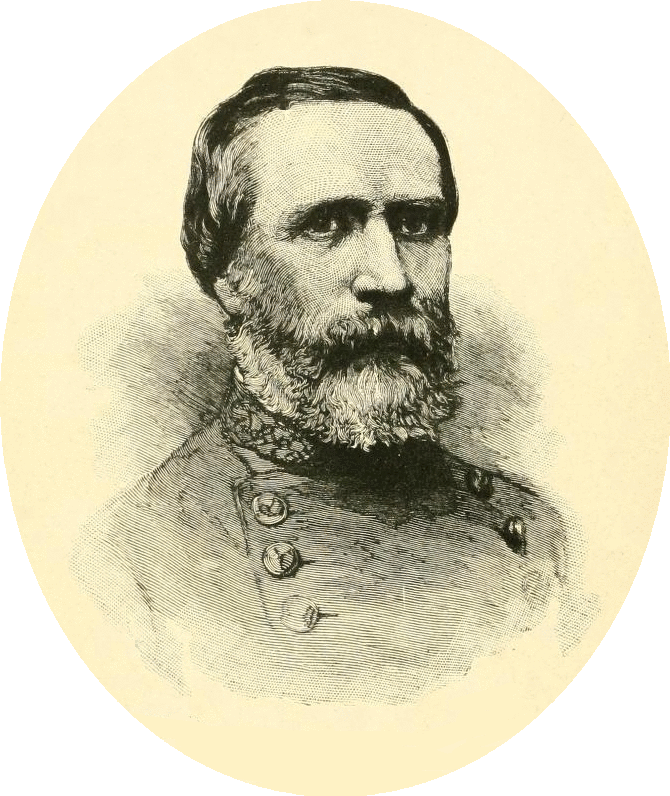
- Born: October 7, 1821; Sumter County, South Carolina
- Died: June 26, 1879 (aged 57); Beaufort, South Carolina
- Burial place: St. Helena's Episcopal Church, Beaufort, South Carolina
- Military career
- Allegiance: United States of America; Confederate States of America
- Branch: United States Army; Confederate States Army
- Service years: 1842–61 (USA); 1861–65 (CSA)
- Rank: Captain (USA); Lieutenant General (CSA)
- Nickname: Fightin Dick
- Commands: First Corps, Army of Northern Virginia; Fourth Corps, Army of Northern Virginia
- Conflicts: Mexican–American War; American Civil War

Richard Heron Anderson (October 7, 1821 – June 26, 1879) was a career U.S. Army officer, fighting with distinction in the Mexican–American War. He also served as a Confederate general during the American Civil War, fighting in the Eastern Theater of the conflict and most notably during the 1864 Battle of Spotsylvania Court House. Anderson was also noted for his humility.

== Early life and career ==
Anderson was born in the High Hills of Santee at Borough House Plantation (Hill Crest), near the town of Stateburg located in Sumter County, South Carolina. He was the son of Dr. William Wallace Anderson and his wife, Mary Jane Mackensie, and the grandson of American Revolutionary War hero and namesake Richard Anderson.

Anderson graduated 40th out of 56 cadets from the United States Military Academy in July 1842. He was brevetted a second lieutenant in the 1st U.S. Dragoons. He served the cavalry school for practice at the U.S. Army Barracks in Carlisle, Pennsylvania, in 1842. Anderson spent 1843 on frontier duty in the American West, serving first at Little Rock, Arkansas, and then on garrison duty at Forts Gibson and Washita, both located in the Indian Territory. His regiment escorted the U.S. Indian Agent to Red River in 1843 and then returned to Fort Washita, remaining there until 1844. Anderson was promoted to second lieutenant on July 16, 1844, and served at Fort Jesup, Louisiana, from 1844 to 1845. His regiment joined the expedition for the military occupation of Texas in 1845, and Anderson was on recruiting duty in 1846.

In the Mexican–American War, Anderson took part in the Siege of Veracruz in March 1847 and then skirmished near La Hoya on June 9. He fought in the Battle of Contreras on August 19, the skirmish near San Agustin Altapulco the following day, and the Battle of Molino del Rey on September 8. He was brevetted to first lieutenant for gallantry during the fighting near San Agustin as of August 17. Anderson also participated in the fight for and capture of Mexico City from September 12–14.

After Mexico, Anderson was promoted to first lieutenant in the 2nd U.S. Dragoons on July 13, 1848, and was again on recruiting duty in 1849. He returned to the Carlisle Barracks from 1849 to 1850 to recruit until 1852. Next came frontier duty in several Texas installations, including at Fort Graham from 1852 to 1853, Fort McKavett from 1853 to 1854, San Antonio in 1854, and Fort McKavett in 1855. He was promoted to captain on March 3, 1855, and was stationed at Fort Riley, Kansas, from 1855 to 1856. Anderson was still serving in Kansas during the border troubles of 1856 and 1857, then was recruiting as well as his last stint at the Carlisle Barracks in 1858. He participated in the Utah War of 1858 and 1859 and was on duty at Fort Kearny, Nebraska, from 1859 to 1861.

== American Civil War ==
Anderson resigned from the U.S. Army (accepted on March 3, 1861) to enter service with the Confederate States Army. Anderson accepted a commission as colonel of the 1st South Carolina Regulars on January 28. He was given command of the Charleston, South Carolina harbor area after the capture of Fort Sumter that April. He was promoted to brigadier general on July 19 and transferred to Pensacola, Florida, where he was wounded in the left elbow during the Battle of Santa Rosa Island on October 9.

After recovering, Anderson joined the Confederate Army of the Potomac in February 1862 (which was absorbed into the Army of Northern Virginia later in the spring) as a brigade commander. Anderson distinguished himself during the Peninsula Campaign, temporarily assuming division command at Seven Pines when General James Longstreet was serving as a wing commander. At Seven Pines, he gained the sobriquet "Fighting Dick", (Note: A moniker shared with U.S. Maj. Gen. Israel B. Richardson whom Anderson would meet in battle at Antietam) and was promoted to major general on July 14 and received command of General Benjamin Huger's former division. As part of Longstreet's corps, Anderson fought at Second Bull Run. His division engaged the final U.S. defensive line around Henry House Hill, but the sun started going down, and he did not press the attack.

During the Maryland Campaign, General Cadmus Wilcox's brigade was added to Anderson's command. At the Battle of Antietam in September 1862, he was in overall command at the sunken road, or "Bloody Lane", in the center of the Confederate defense. He was wounded in the thigh and left the battle. His senior brigadier Roger A. Pryor took over command. After Anderson's departure, his division faltered and eventually succumbed to U.S. flank attacks that routed them from their position. His division was not heavily engaged at the Battle of Fredericksburg that December.

During the Battle of Chancellorsville in May 1863, while operating away from Longstreet's command (because Longstreet was on detached duty near Suffolk, Virginia, at the time), Anderson pressed the U.S. left while Lt. Gen. Thomas J. "Stonewall" Jackson attacked the right. Anderson and Maj. Gen. Lafayette McLaws left the main battle line on May 3 and struck east to check the advance of U.S. Maj. Gen. John Sedgwick's VI Corps that would have led into Gen. Robert E. Lee's rear. Following the death of Stonewall Jackson on May 10, Lee reorganized his army from two into three corps. Anderson was admired enough by Lee to be considered for corps command, but instead, his division was assigned to the new Third Corps, commanded by now Lt. Gen A.P. Hill, who outranked Anderson and was one of the senior-most generals in the army. After reorganizing, Anderson retained most of his existing command except for Brig. Gen Lewis Armistead's brigade, which was reassigned to George Pickett's division.

=== Gettysburg ===
At the Battle of Gettysburg in July 1863, Anderson's division was third in the line of march approaching the town from the west on July 1, so they arrived late and had little involvement in the start of the battle.

On July 2, the second day of battle, Anderson's division attacked near the U.S. center, following on from attacks by Longstreet (the divisions of Maj. Gens. John B. Hood and McLaws) to his right. Anderson's right was successful in attacking U.S. Brig. Gen. Andrew A. Humphreys's III Corps division along the Emmitsburg Road. His center, under Ambrose R. Wright, penetrated the lightly defended Cemetery Ridge. Carnot Posey moved haltingly and William Mahone did not move from Seminary Ridge at all. U.S. reinforcements rushed to counter Wright, and he was repulsed. Anderson was criticized for his command during this day of battle. He had little effective control of his brigades. On July 3, Anderson's brigades participated in the waning minutes of Pickett's Charge, but both were driven back.

=== Wilderness and Spotsylvania ===
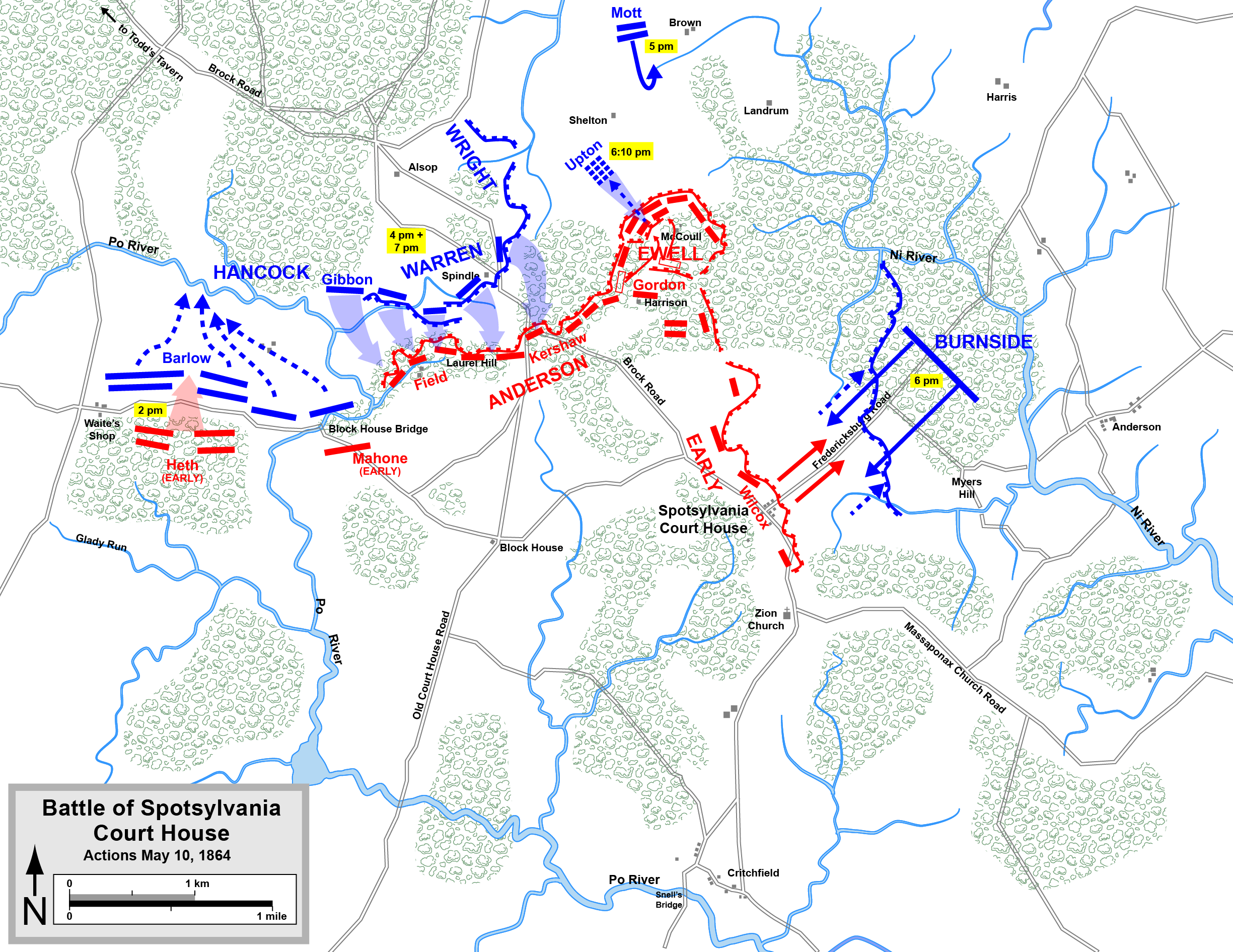
Battle of Spotsylvania Court House, actions May 10, 1864 C.S.A. U.S.A.

During the spring of 1864, at the Battle of the Wilderness, Longstreet was severely wounded, and Anderson took command of the First Corps, leading it throughout the Overland Campaign. After the Wilderness, he fought well at the Battle of Spotsylvania Court House. Anderson and his corps executed an all-night forced march on May 7 that secured that important position (reinforcing the Confederate cavalry earlier sent there) and arrived just before U.S. soldiers did. Reaching and defending this spot denied the U.S. soldiers a way around Lee's army towards Richmond, and Anderson held it during heavy fighting from May 8–12.

Anderson then fought at the Battle of Cold Harbor in early June and participated in the rest of the Army of Northern Virginia's operations to the south of Petersburg, Virginia, from mid-June until October. Anderson was promoted to temporary lieutenant general on May 31.

When Longstreet returned from his convalescence on October 19, 1864, Lee created the new Fourth Corps, which Anderson led through the Siege of Petersburg and the retreat towards Appomattox Court House in 1865. Because of several attacks by U.S. cavalry nipping at his corps, Anderson was forced to slow, occasionally stop, and beat off the attacks. This caused the Confederates to become isolated from the rest of Lee's army, moving west, and they were now the army's rear guard. The corps finally halted and fought at Sayler's Creek on April 6, which ended in a rout, and as Lee witnessed it, he exclaimed, "Has the army been dissolved?" As the corps' survivors reformed and rejoined the army, what was left of the Fourth Corps was merged with the Second Corps on April 8. This left Anderson without a command, and he proceeded home to South Carolina. Anderson assumed command of M. H. Hannon's Cavalry Brigade after Hannon was wounded at Monroe's Crossroads. Anderson was pardoned on September 27, 1865, although there is no record of his parole.

== Postbellum career and death ==
After the war, Anderson was a planter in Stateburg, South Carolina from 1866 to 1868, attempting to grow cotton. Having no agricultural background, this effort ended in bankruptcy. He then became a worker and later an agent of the South Carolina Railroad, working out of Camden, South Carolina from 1868 to 1878. However, Anderson was fired from this position and served as a state phosphate inspector/agent of South Carolina in 1879.

Anderson was married twice. In 1850 he wed Sarah Gibson, and the couple had two children together, a son and a daughter; after her death, he married Martha Mellette on December 24, 1874. Five years later, Anderson died at the age of 57 in Beaufort, South Carolina, and was buried there in the churchyard cemetery of Parish Church of St. Helena.

== See also ==
- List of American Civil War generals (Confederate)
