= Stateburg Historic District =

Historic district in South Carolina, United States

- U.S. National Register of Historic Places
- U.S. Historic district
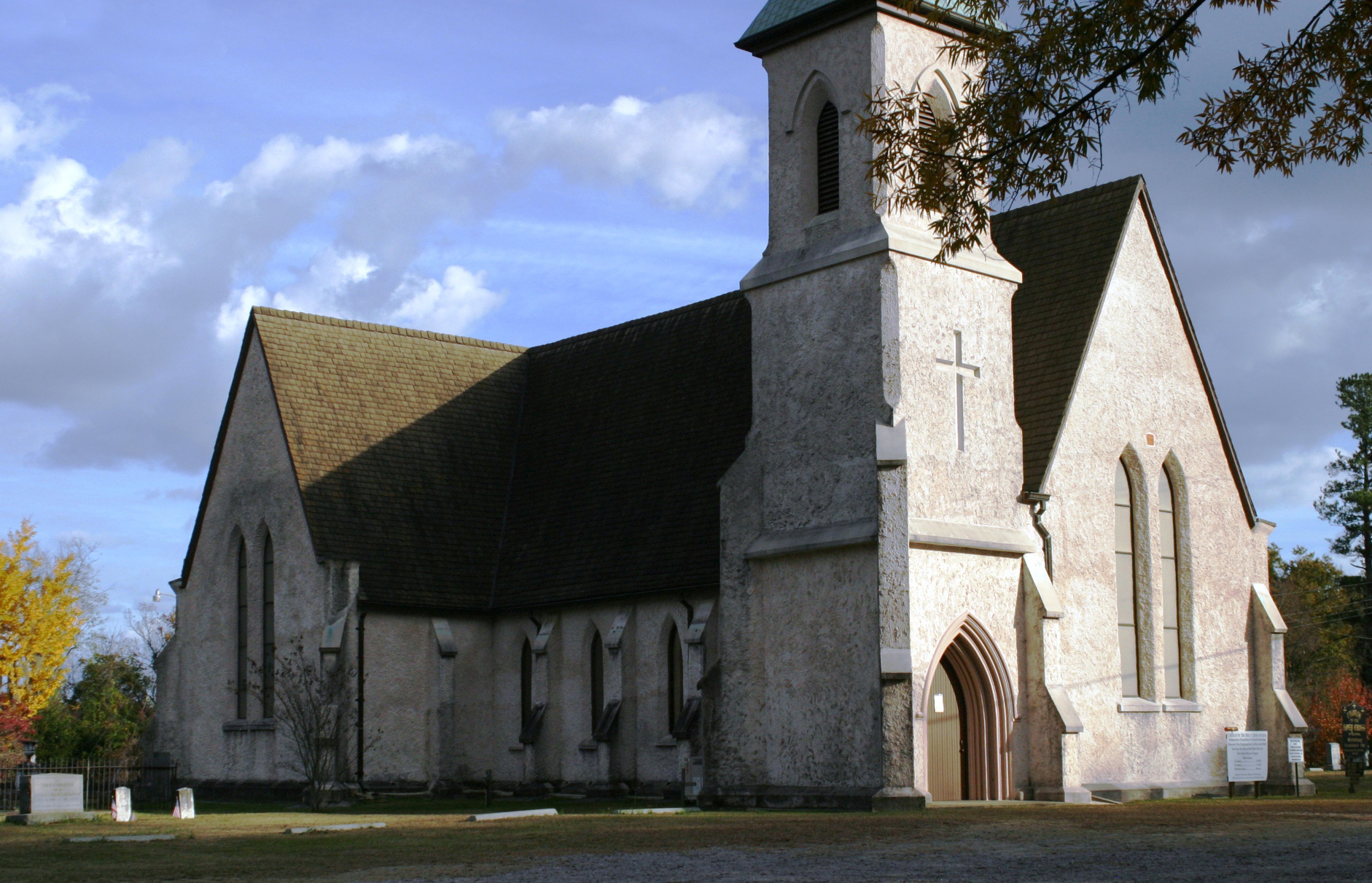
- Church of the Holy Cross, Stateburg

- Location within South Carolina Location within the United States
- Interactive map showing the location for Statesburg Historic District
- Nearest city: Roughly bounded by U.S. Route 76 and South Carolina Highways 261 and 441, near Sumter, South Carolina
- Coordinates: 33°58′13″N 80°30′51″W
- Area: 5,066 acres (2,050 ha)
- Architect: Jones, E.C.
- Architectural style: Greek Revival, Gothic Revival
- NRHP reference No.: 71000809
- Added to NRHP: February 24, 1971

The Stateburg Historic District is a historic district in Stateburg, in the High Hills of Santee area near Sumter, South Carolina in the United States. It includes two National Historic Landmarks, Borough House Plantation and the Church of the Holy Cross, and at least eight contributing properties within its boundaries. On February 24, 1971, it was added to the National Register of Historic Places. The historic district extends north and east of the town of Stateburg as far north as Meeting House Road and as far east as South Carolina Highway 441, covering an area of 5,066 acres (20.50 km^{2}).

== Description ==
The town of Stateburg was founded in 1783 by General Thomas Sumter, who hoped it would become the capital of the state, but it lost to Columbia by only a few votes. Previously the area had been used by people from Charleston to build summer homes to use to escape the oppressive heat of the Lowcountry. It was the county seat of the former Claremont County from 1783 to 1800. Stateburg was a thriving community until April, 1865, when many of its buildings were destroyed by Union troops under Brigadier General Edward E. Potter.

== Contributing Properties ==
Contributing properties include:

- Borough House Plantation
- Brookland Plantation
- Chapel of Ease — built for Natalie DeLage Sumter, daughter-in-law of General Thomas Sumter
- High Hills of Santee Baptist Church
- Maverick House
- Miller House, also known as Ellison House — the home of Governor Stephen D. Miller, who sold it to William Ellison, a slave who had bought his freedom in 1816.
- Millwood Plantation
- Moorhill
- Oakland Plantation
- The Ruins — home of General Thomas Sumter in 1784. Despite its name, the home is still extant.
- Tomb of General Thomas Sumter — a South Carolina State Historic Site, managed as part of nearby Poinsett State Park.

== See also ==
- List of Registered Historic Places in South Carolina
