= Rammed earth =

Construction material of damp subsoil

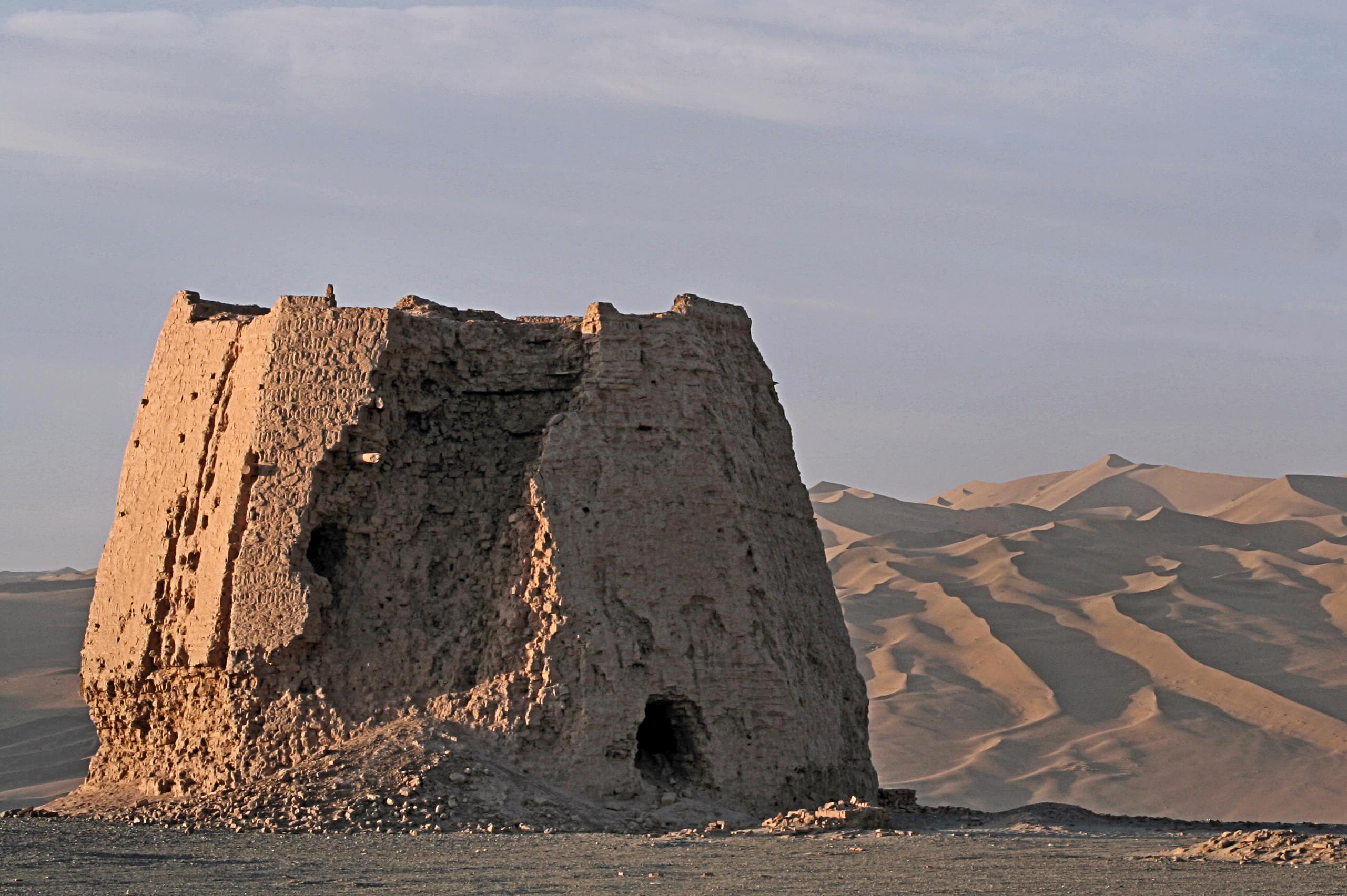
The ruins of a Han dynasty (202 BCE – 220 CE) Chinese watchtower made of rammed earth in Dunhuang, Province of Gansu, China, at the eastern end of the Silk Road

Rammed earth, also called pisé, is a technique for constructing foundations, floors, and walls using compacted natural raw materials such as earth, chalk, lime, or gravel. It is an ancient method that has been revived recently as a sustainable building method.

Pisé also refers to a material for sculptures, usually small and made in molds. It has been especially used in Central Asia and Tibetan art, and sometimes in China.

Edifices formed of rammed earth are found worldwide, in a range of environments including temperate, wet, semiarid desert, montane, and tropical regions. The availability of suitable soil and a building design appropriate for local climatic conditions are two factors that make its use favorable.

== Building process ==
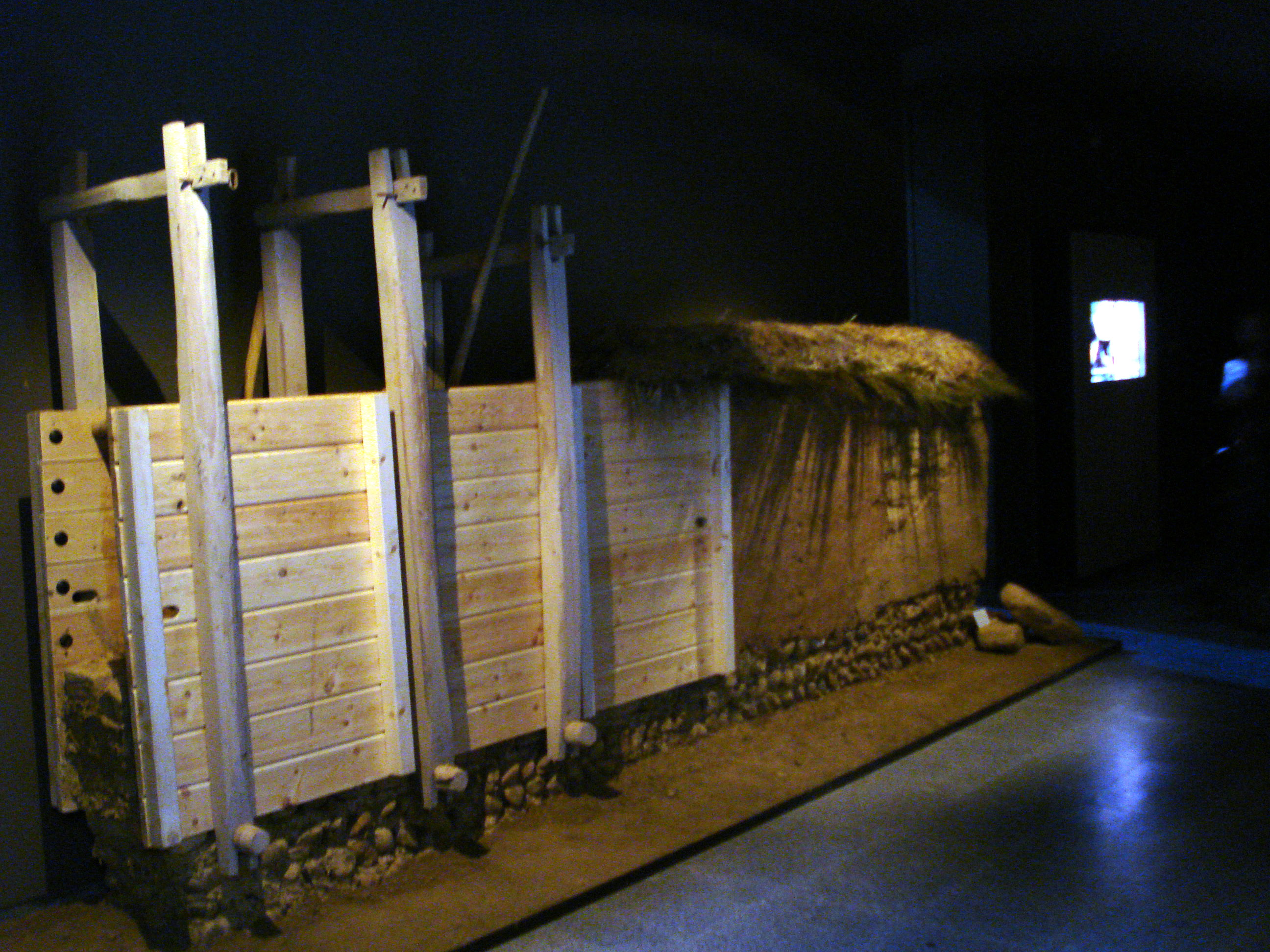
Traditional model of construction of a wall of rammed earth on a foundation

Making rammed earth involves compacting a damp mixture of subsoil that has suitable proportions of sand, gravel, clay, silt, and stabilizer if any, into a formwork (an externally supported frame or mold).

Historically, additives such as lime or animal blood were used to stabilize it.

Soil mix is poured into the formwork to a depth of 10 to 25 cm (4 to 10 in) and then compacted to approximately 50% of its original volume. The soil is compacted iteratively in batches or courses so as to gradually erect the wall up to the top of the formwork. Tamping was historically manual with a long ramming pole by hand, but modern construction systems can employ pneumatically-powered tampers.

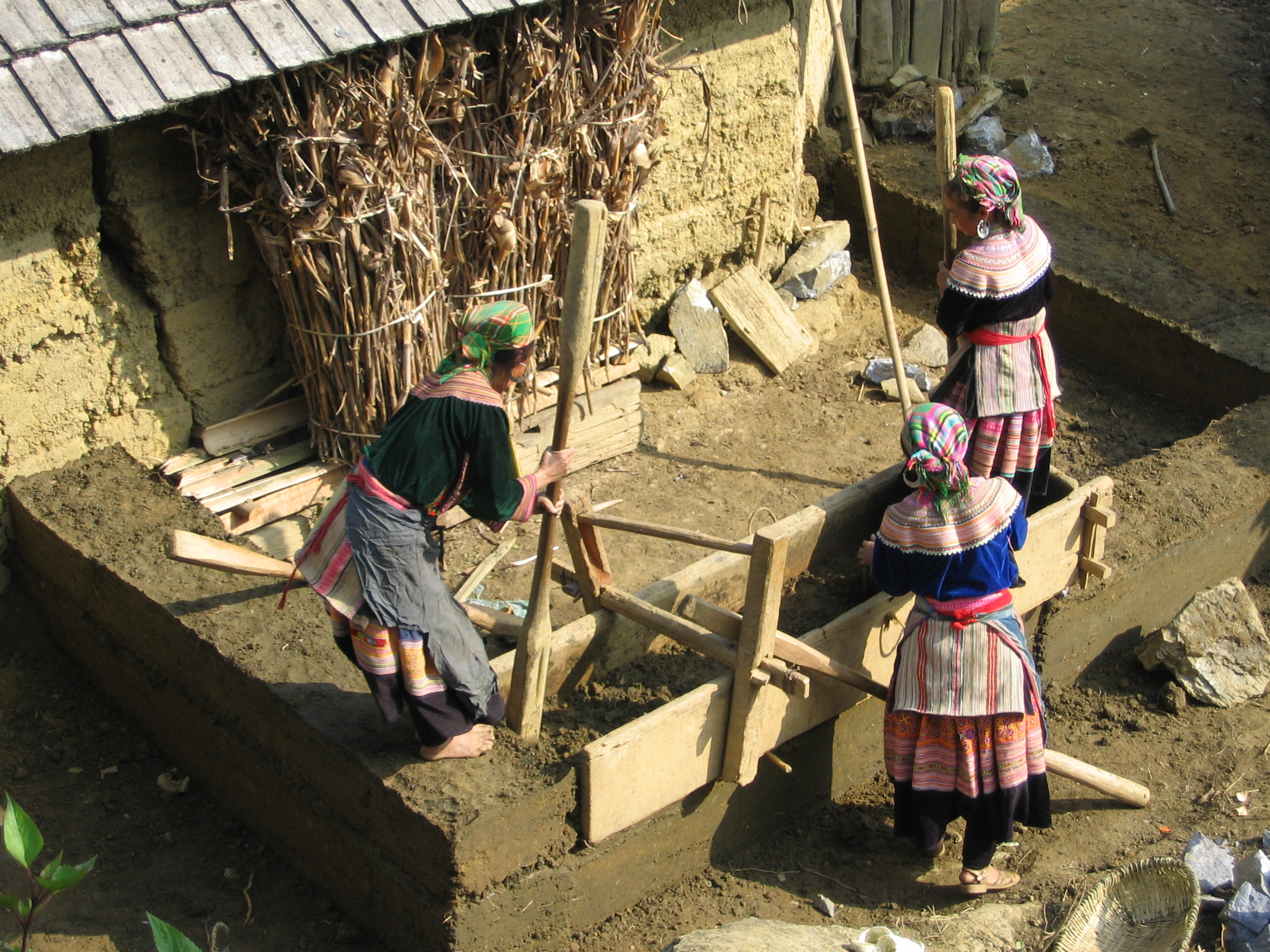
A typical Hmong housebuilding technique in the subtropical climate of Vietnam

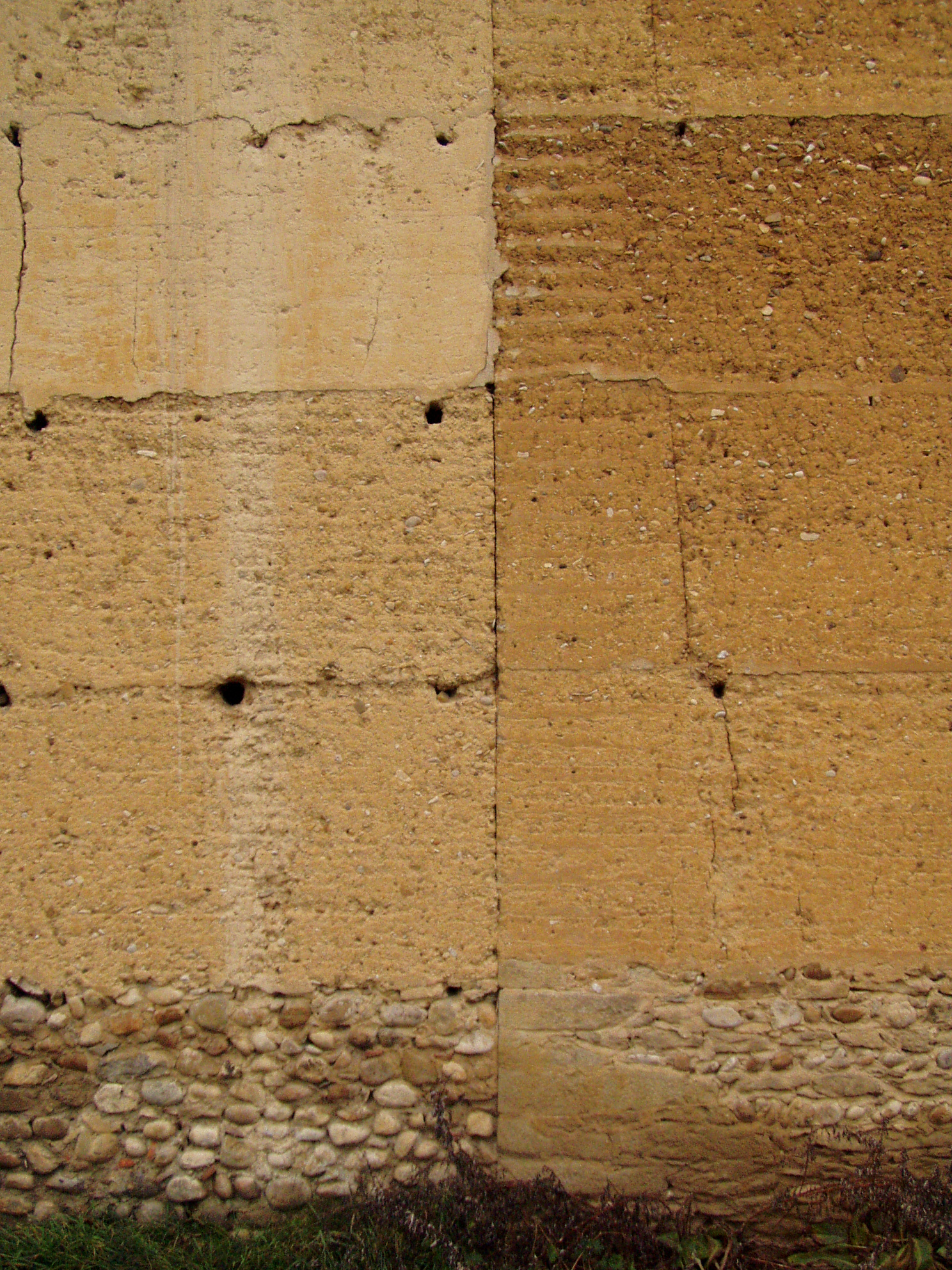
Old rammed-earth wall with deterioration, in France

After a wall is complete, it is sufficiently strong to immediately remove the formwork. This is necessary if a surface texture is to be applied, e.g., by wire brushing, carving, or mold impression because the walls become too hard to work after approximately one hour. The compressive strength of rammed earth increases as it cures. Cement-stabilized rammed earth is cured for a minimum period of 28 days.

In modern rammed-earth buildings, the walls are constructed on top of conventional footings or a reinforced-concrete slab base.

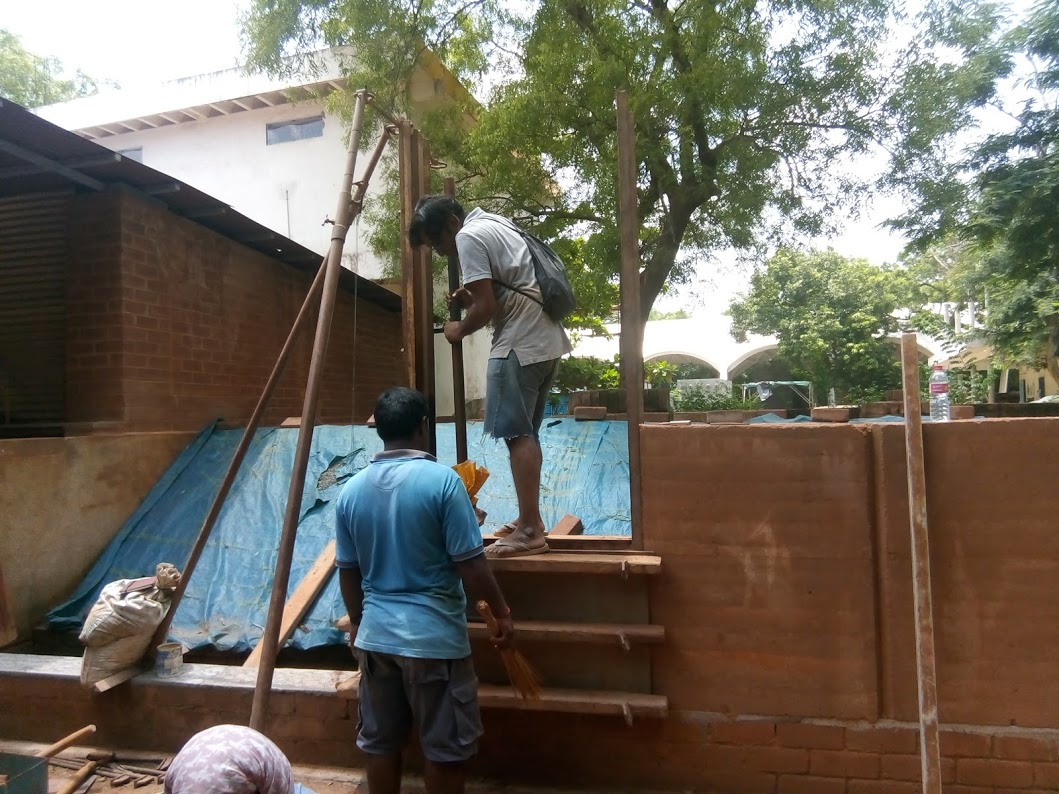
Contemporary slip formwork in use

The construction of an entire wall begins with a temporary frame, the "formwork", which is usually made of wood or plywood, as a mold for each wall section's desired shape and dimensions. The form must be durable and well-braced, and the two opposing faces must be clamped together to prevent bulging or deformation caused by the large compressing forces. Formwork plays an important role in building rammed-earth walls. Historically, wooden planks tied using rope were used to build walls. Modern builders use plywood or steel (or both) to build formwork.

== Characteristics ==
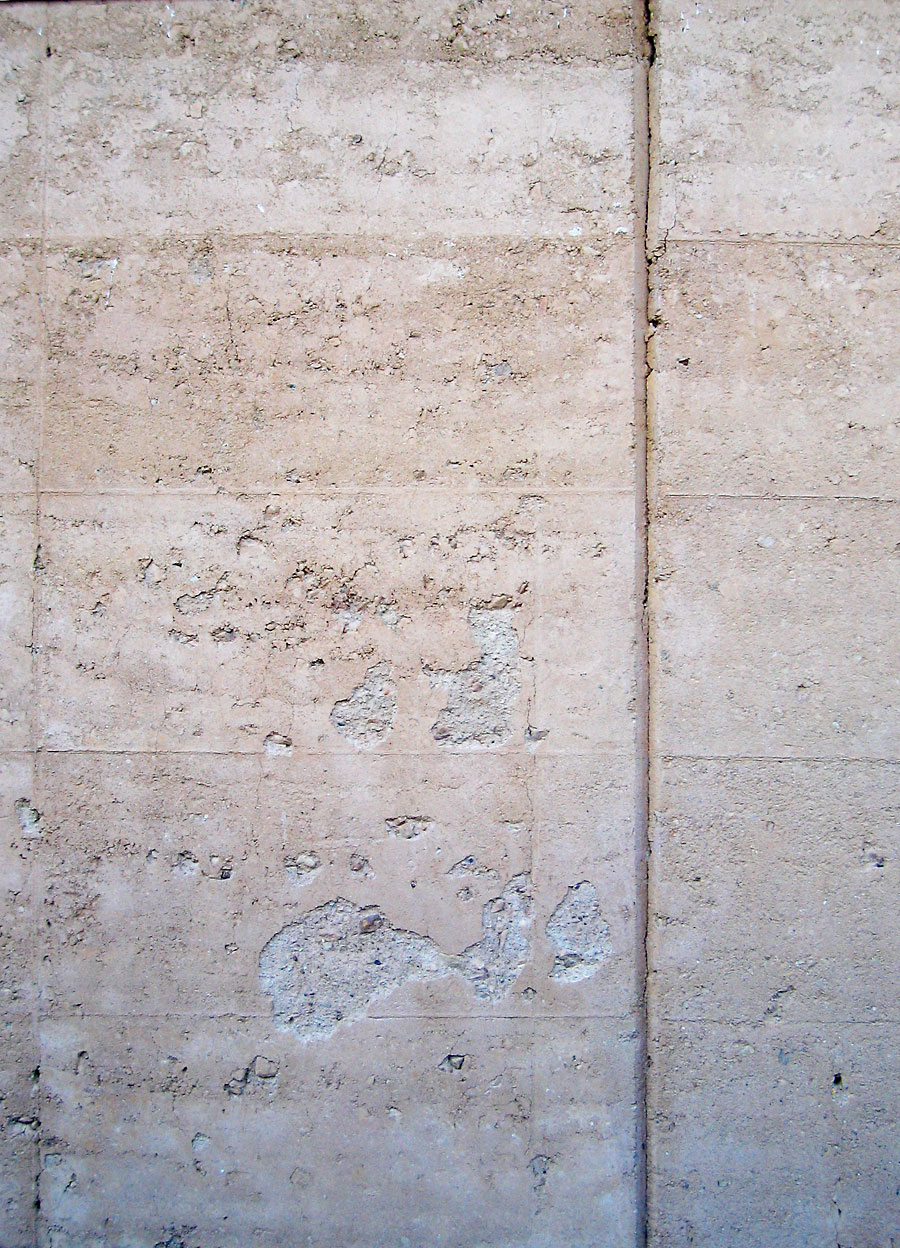
Detail of the surface of an eroded rammed-earth wall: apart from the patches of damage, the surface shows regular horizontal lines caused by the wooden formwork and subtler horizontal strata from successive courses.

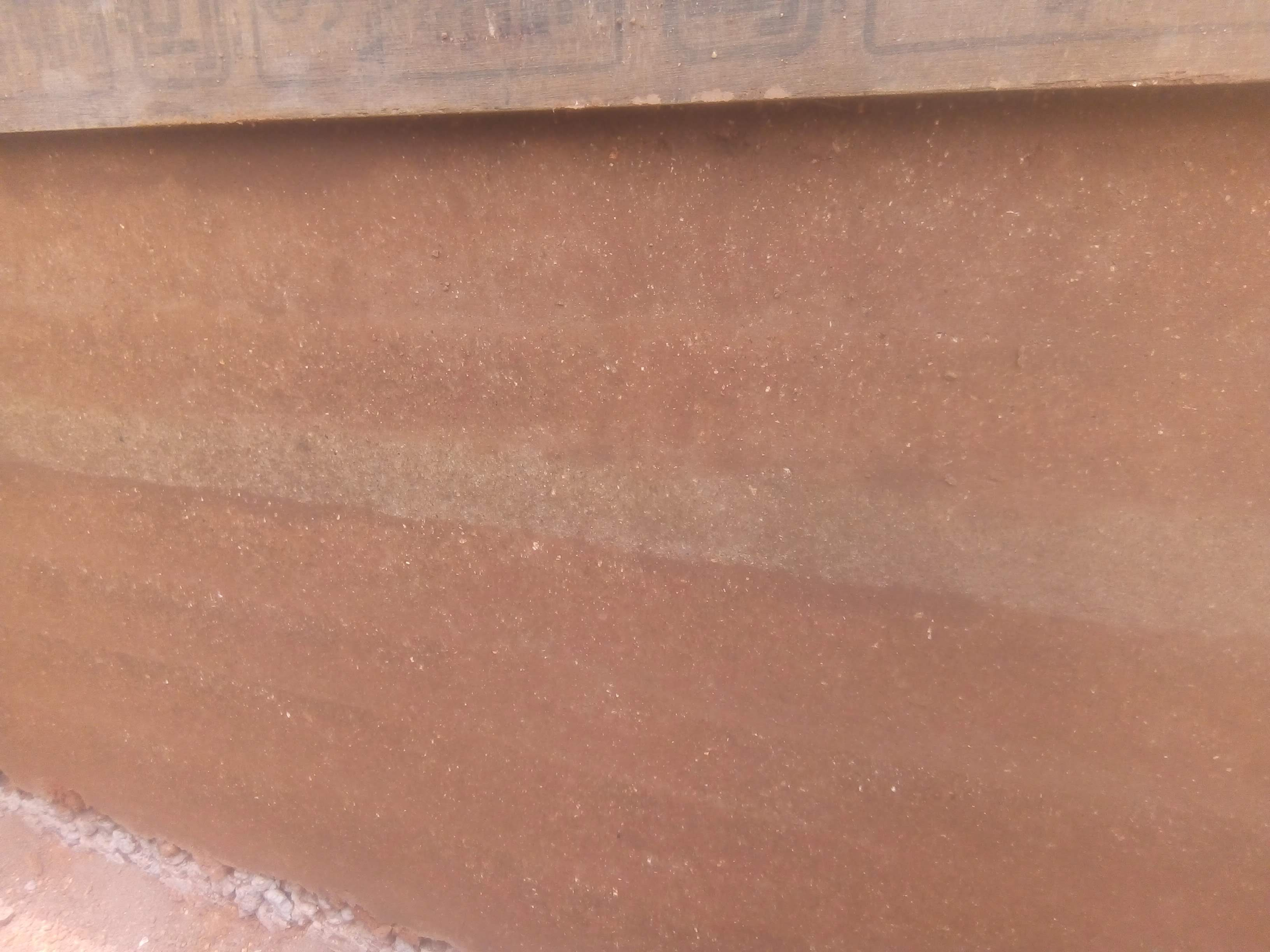
Surface of a newly built rammed-earth wall just after the removal of formwork

The compressive strength of rammed earth is dictated by factors such as soil type, particle size distribution, amount of compaction, moisture content of the mix and the type and amount of stabiliser used. Well-produced cement-stabilised rammed-earth walls can be anywhere between 5 and 18 MPa (700 and 3,000 psi). Higher compressive strength may require more cement. But addition of more cement can affect the permeability of the walls. Properly constructed rammed earth endures for thousands of years, as many ancient structures that are still standing around the world demonstrate. In areas of high seismic activity, rammed-earth walls are reinforced with rebars.

Adding cement to soil mixtures low in clay can also increase the load-bearing capacity of rammed-earth edifices. The United States Department of Agriculture observed in 1925 that rammed-earth structures endure indefinitely and can be constructed for less than two-thirds of the cost of standard frame houses.

One significant benefit of rammed earth is its high thermal mass: like brick or concrete, it absorbs heat during the day and releases heat at night. This action moderates daily temperature variations and reduces the need for air conditioning and heating. In colder climates, rammed-earth walls can be insulated by inserting insulation such as styrofoam or rigid fibreglass panels within internal and external layers of rammed earth. Depending on the type and content of binder, it must also be protected from heavy rain and insulated with vapour barriers.

Rammed earth can effectively regulate humidity if unclad walls containing clay are exposed to an internal space. Humidity is regulated between 40% and 60%. The material mass and clay content of rammed earth allows an edifice to breathe more than concrete edifices. This avoids problems of condensation and prevents significant loss of heat.

Rammed-earth walls have the colour and texture of natural earth. Moisture-impermeable finishes, such as cement render, are not used by some people because they impair the ability of a wall to desorb moisture, which quality is necessary to preserve its strength.

Blemishes can be repaired using the soil mixture as a plaster and sanded smooth.

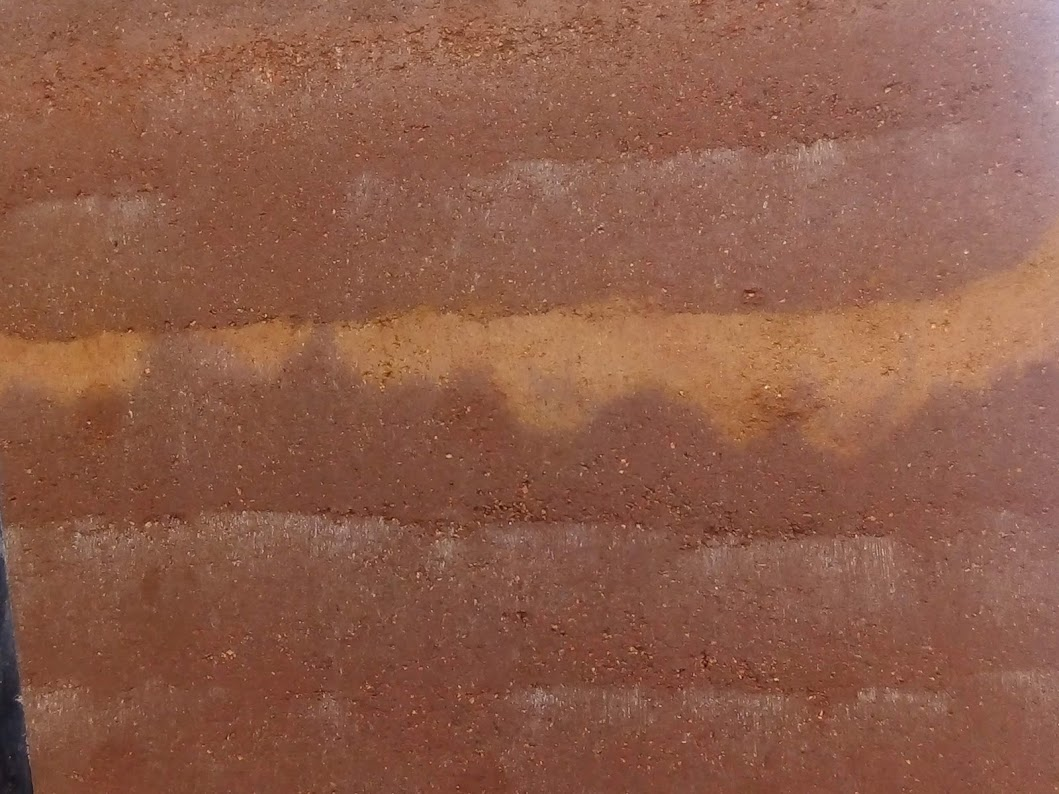
A wall surface with oxide colour for visual appeal

The thickness varies widely based on region and code. It can be as little as 6 inches (150 mm) for non load-bearing walls and up to 24 inches (600 mm) for load-bearing walls. The thickness and density of rammed-earth walls make them suitable for soundproofing. They are also inherently fireproof, resistant to termite damage, and non-toxic.

== Environmental effects and sustainability ==
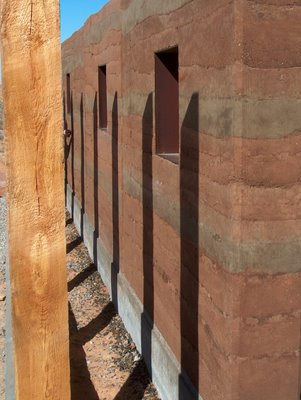
Rammed-earth trombe wall constructed by Design Build Bluff

Edifices of rammed earth are potentially more sustainable and environmentally friendly than other building techniques, depending on multiple factors and level of local material sourcing. Rammed-earth edifices that use locally available materials have low embodied energy and generate very little waste. The soils used are typically subsoil which conserve the topsoil for agriculture. When the soil excavated in preparation for a foundation can be used, the cost and energy consumption of transportation are minimal, but this requires testing of materials for suitability. Rammed earth has potentially low manufacturing footprint, contingent on the amount of cement and the amount that is locally sourced; it is often quarried aggregates rather than "earth".

Rammed earth can contribute to the overall energy efficiency of edifices: the density, thickness, and thermal conductivity of rammed earth render it an especially suitable material for passive solar heating. Warmth requires almost 12 hours to be conducted through a wall 35 cm (14 in) thick.

Mixing cement with the soil can counteract sustainable benefits (for instance, if the structure has a short lifespan) such as low embodied energy because manufacture of the cement itself creates 1.25 tonnes of carbon dioxide per tonne of cement produced. Although it has low greenhouse gas emissions in theory, transportation and the production of cement can add significantly to the overall emissions of modern rammed-earth construction. For example, a 300 mm rammed-earth wall with 5% cement content produces slightly more emissions than a 100mm concrete wall.

== Contemporary Uses ==
Contemporary construction of rammed earth has oftentimes taken a different approach from its traditional building methods to construct efficiently and comply with governing ordinances. A primary constraint of building with rammed earth is the lack of research and building code limitations. In Europe, governing authorities play a large role in insuring new construction; inconsistent insurance approvals halt or severely elongate construction. To work with the regulations of the material, especially their structural capacity, contemporary projects reinforce earthen structures with already approved materials. The Maison Pour Tous, a community center in the Isère region of France, utilized large openings in the design to introduce moment-resisting reinforced concrete frames at each opening. Similarly, other solutions considered to reduce tensile limitations were to incorporate steel reinforcing elements.

Although structural and code limitations are some of the primary factors considered for construction, modern technologies have allowed for experimentation with digital fabrication and creative implementations. Hall et al. (2012) describe that contemporary criteria for rammed earth construction include: leveraging tools and machinery in the construction process, incorporating accuracy in finishes and reproducibility, abiding by code, and protecting thermal comfort and occupant well-being. Construction has been moving towards the prefabrication of rammed earth to reduce construction time and decrease on-site interventions. “In 2020, the Australian start-up company Form Earth© introduced a prototype for an automated system for rammed earth wall production. The system, called ‘Freeform’, utilises a compact unit consisting of a material hopper, a compaction tool, and a slip formwork. The whole system is portable and can operate either off-site or on-site.” Off-site production, paired with BIM design models, has enabled the experimentation of patterns and textures in rammed earth through formwork designs or mold creation for rammed earth blocks. For instance, the Swiss company ERNE AG Holzbau has advanced manufacturing with robots that mass-produce individual rammed earth elements directly from a CAD/BIM model.

Technological advancements can help improve the quality of construction and its function for local communities. A study conducted in Jinjia Town of Suining City, Sichuan Province, China, surveyed 151 residents living in a community of older rammed earth homes to assess their satisfaction with the space. Although most were satisfied with the sustainable and cultural qualities that earthen architecture contributed to their landscape, they were also worried about the seismic performance.

== History ==
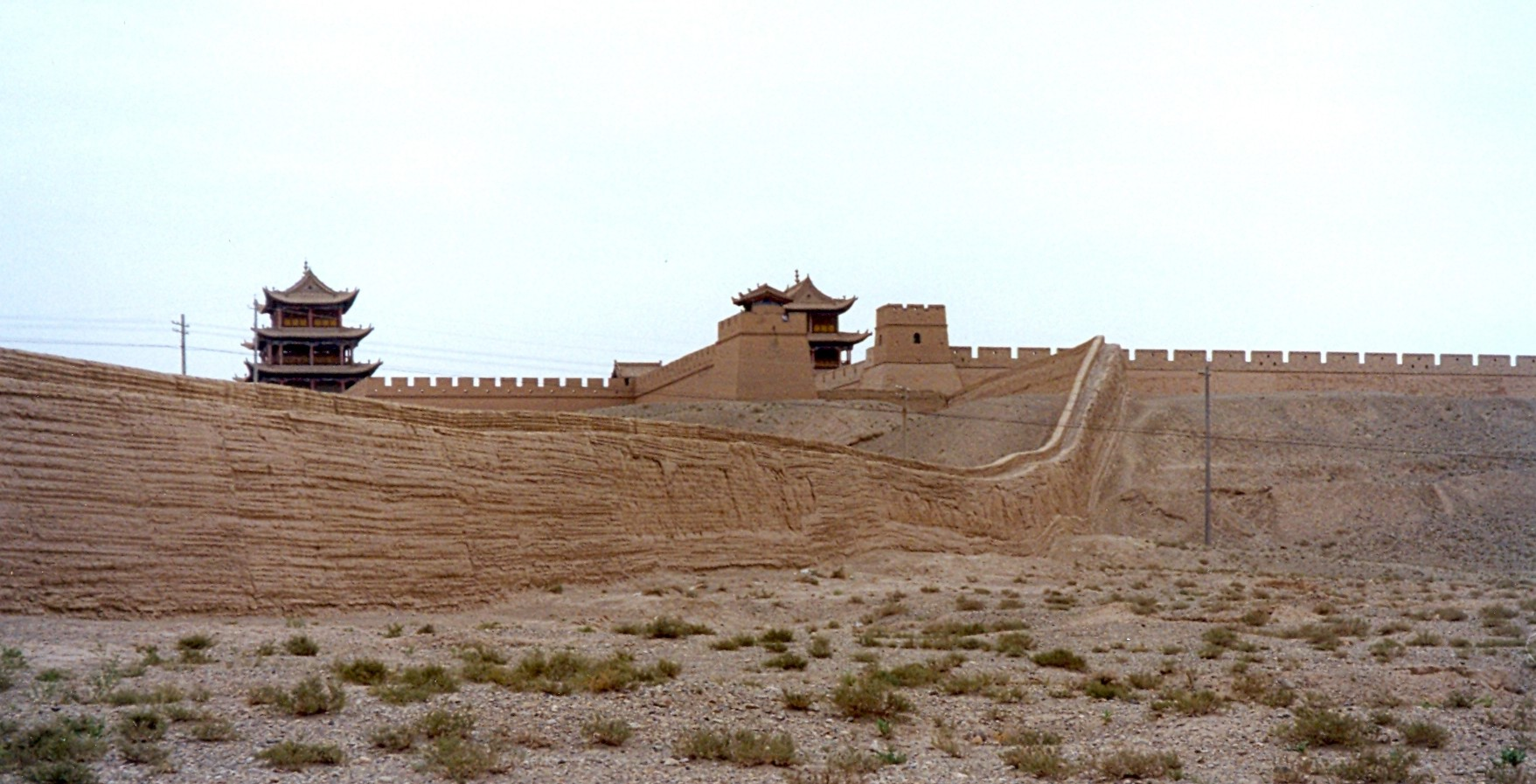
A hangtu section of the Great Wall of China

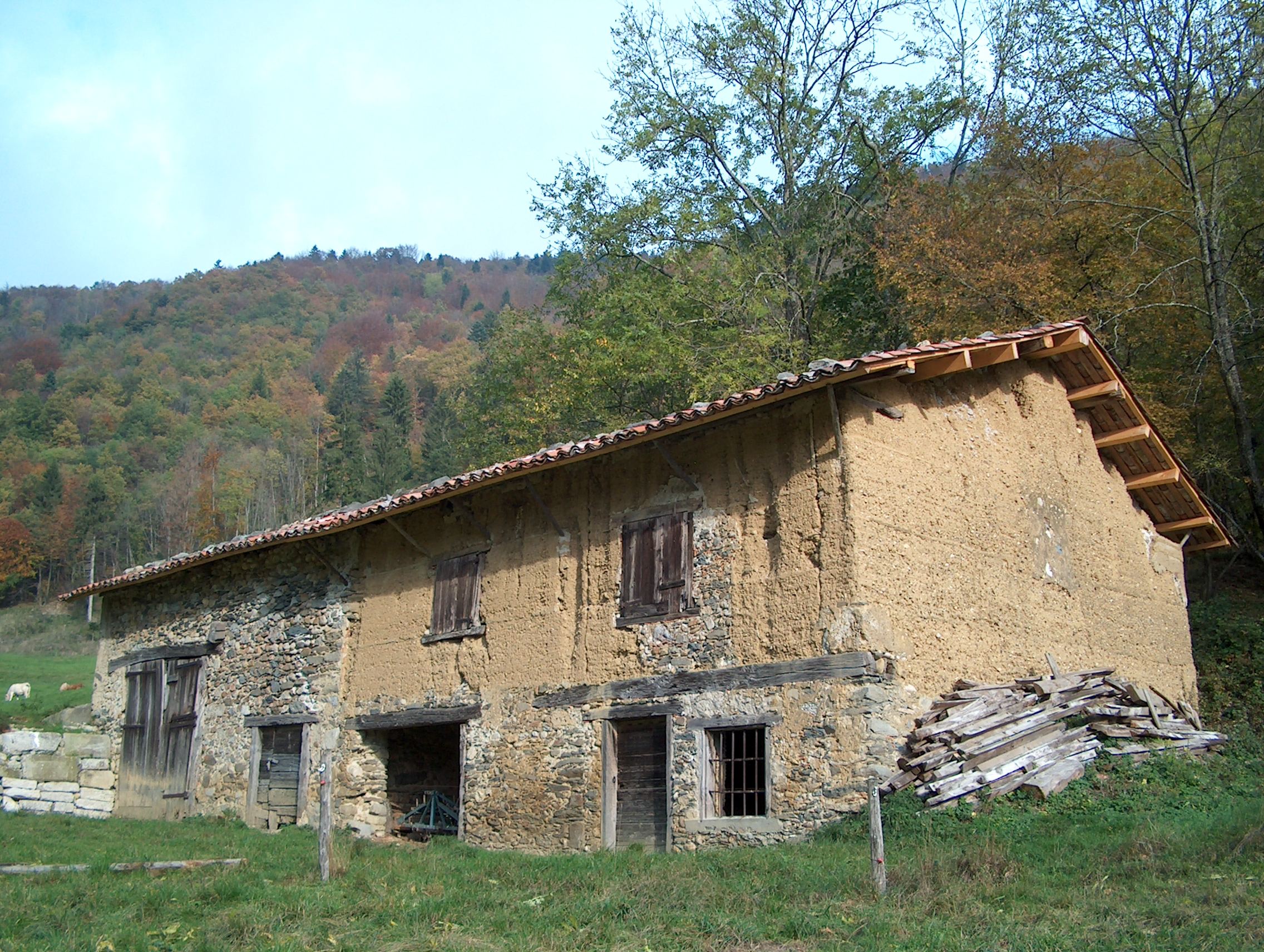
Rammed-earth edifice on a farm in France

Evidence of ancient use of rammed earth has been found in Neolithic archaeological sites such as those of the Fertile Crescent, dating to the 9th–7th millennium BC, and of the Yangshao and Longshan cultures in China, dating to 5000 BCE. By 2000 BCE, rammed-earth architectural techniques (夯土 Hāng tǔ) were commonly used for walls and foundations in China.

=== United States and Canada ===
In the 1800s, rammed earth was popularized in the United States by the book Rural Economy by S. W. Johnson. The technique was used to construct the Borough House Plantation and the Church of the Holy Cross in Stateburg, South Carolina, both being National Historic Landmarks.

Constructed in 1821, the Borough House Plantation complex contains the oldest and largest collection of 'high style' pise de terre (rammed earth) buildings in the United States. Six of the 27 dependencies and portions of the main house were constructed using this ancient technique which was introduced to this country in 1806 through the book Rural Economy, by S. W. Johnson

An outstanding example of a rammed-earth edifice in Canada is St. Thomas Anglican Church in Shanty Bay, Ontario, erected between 1838 and 1841.

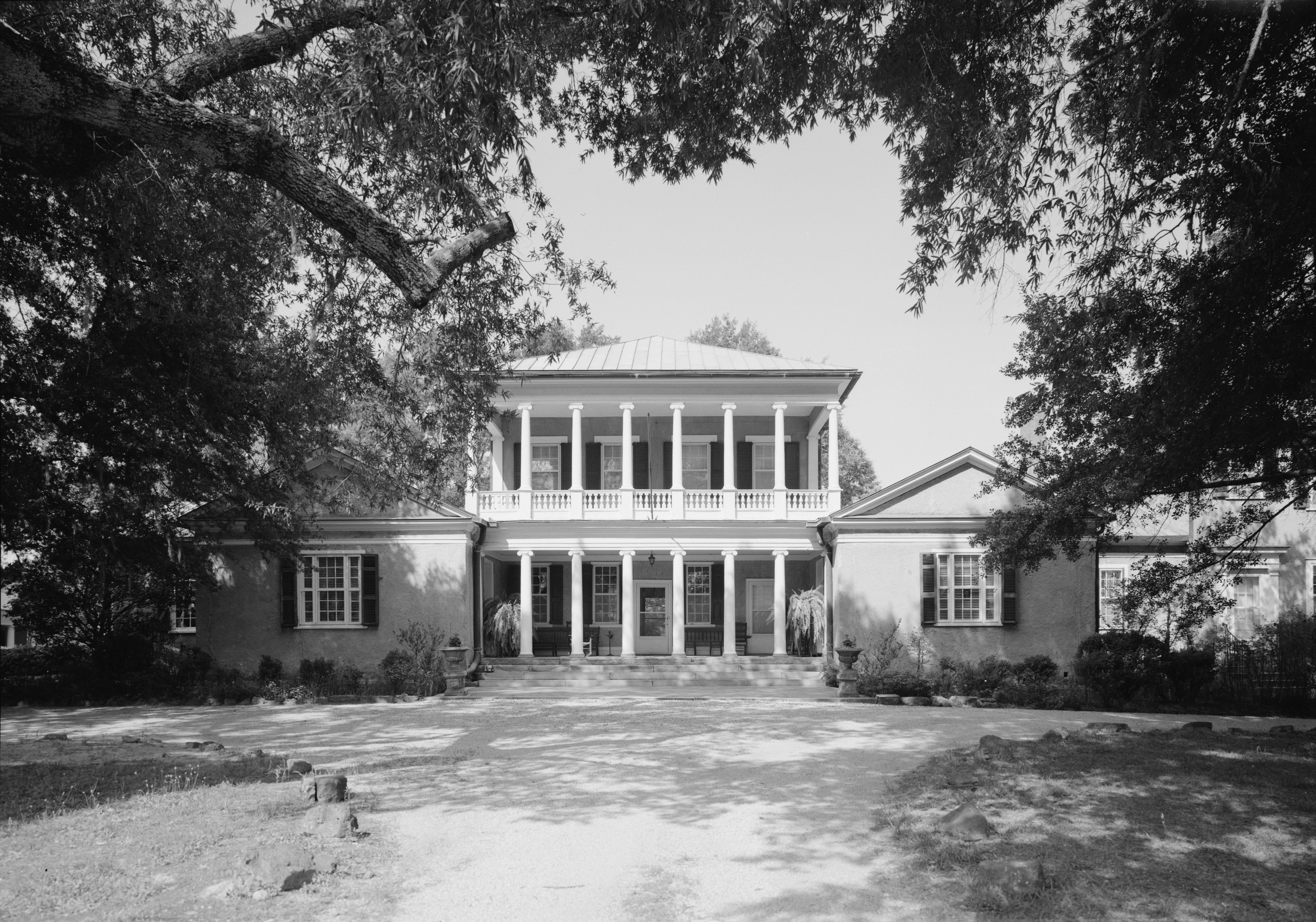
Edifices of the Borough House Plantation, Stateburg, South Carolina, erected in the 1820s.

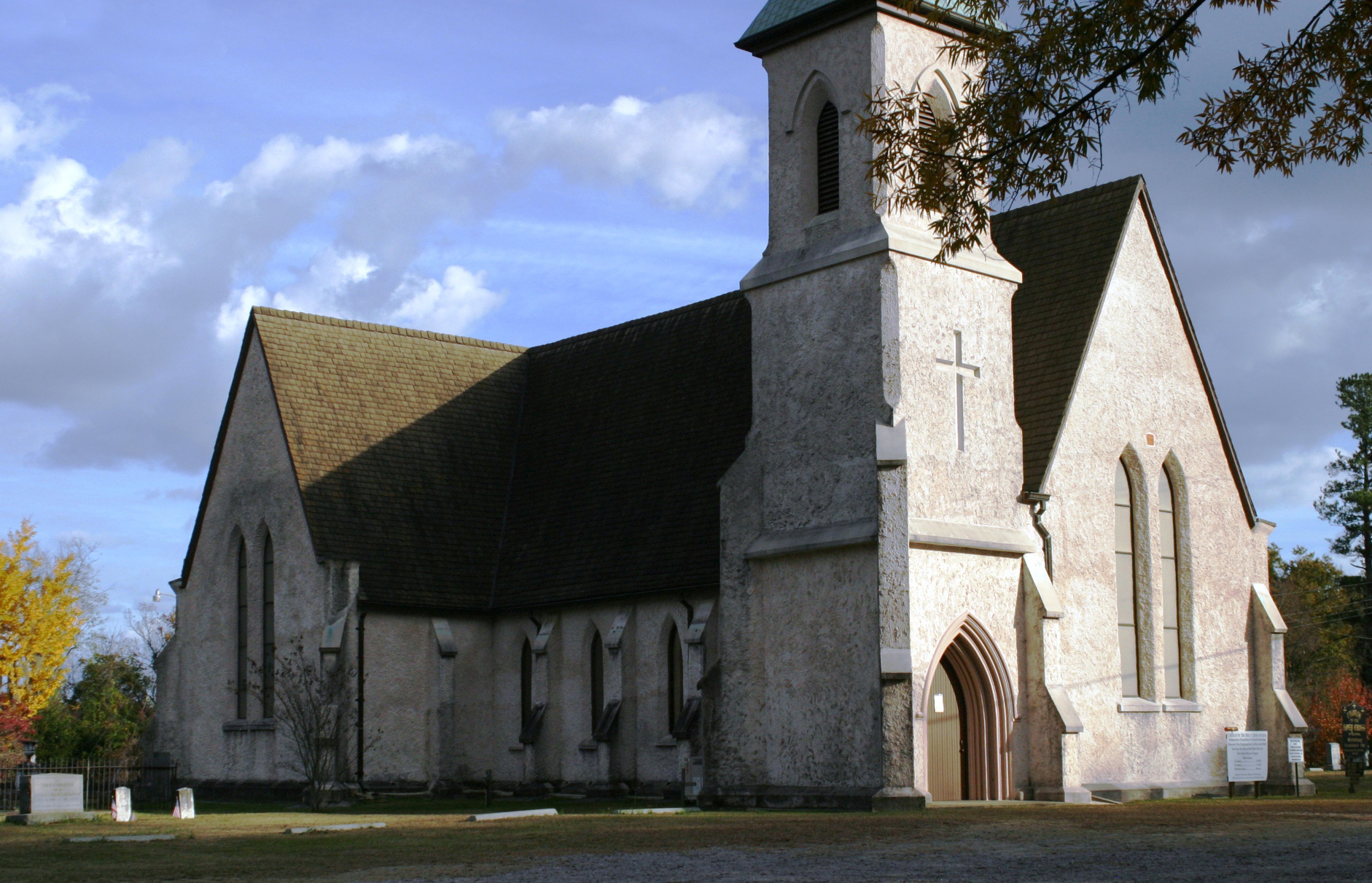
Holy Cross Episcopal Church in Stateburg, South Carolina, erected between 1850 and 1852

From the 1920s through the 1940s rammed-earth construction in the US was studied. South Dakota State College extensively researched and constructed almost one hundred weathering walls of rammed earth. For over 30 years the college investigated the use of paints and plasters in relation to colloids in soil. In 1943, Clemson Agricultural College of South Carolina published the results of their research of rammed earth in a pamphlet titled "Rammed Earth Building Construction". In 1936, on a homestead near Gardendale, Alabama, the United States Department of Agriculture constructed experimental rammed-earth edifices with architect Thomas Hibben. The houses were inexpensively constructed and were sold to the public along with sufficient land for gardens and small plots for livestock. The project successfully provided homes to low-income families.

The US Agency for International Development is working with developing countries to improve the engineering of rammed-earth houses. It also financed the authorship of the Handbook of Rammed Earth by Texas A&M University and the Texas Transportation Institute.

Interest in rammed earth declined after World War II when the cost of modern construction materials decreased. Rammed earth is considered substandard, and is opposed by many contractors, engineers, and tradesmen.

A notable example of 21st-century use of rammed earth is the façade of the Nk'Mip Desert Cultural Centre in southern British Columbia, Canada. As of 2014 it is the longest rammed-earth wall in North America.

=== Australia ===
Australia has developed a significant contemporary technical culture of rammed-earth construction, particularly in Western Australia. The history of rammed earth in Australia dates back to early colonial times, with each state and territory using rammed earth in some capacity, though it was most prominent in New South Wales, where the architectural legacy of the MacKnight family had a lasting influence in the Riverina region.

Contemporary Australian rammed-earth construction first developed in the 1970s in Western Australia, where numerous examples of residential, educational, commercial, and community buildings have been constructed over the last 40 years. The rammed-earth construction method is well established in Western Australia and is an economical option in that state.

In the past 30 years, cement-stabilised rammed earth (CSRE) has gained popularity in Australia. It consists of a mix of low-clay soil, water, and cement, and is an order of magnitude stronger than traditional rammed earth, withstanding compression forces up to 40 megapascals, giving it similar strength and durability to concrete.

Despite growing interest, one obstacle to wider adoption of rammed earth in Australia is the lack of a national building code specifically for rammed-earth buildings, which discourages many engineers and architects from using it.

=== 20th century China ===
Rammed-earth construction was both practically and ideologically important during the rapid construction of the Daqing oil field and the related development of Daqing. The "Daqing Spirit" represented deep personal commitment in pursuing national goals, self-sufficient and frugal living, and urban-rural integrated land use. Daqing's urban-rural landscape was said to embody the ideal communist society described by Karl Marx because it eliminated (1) the gap between town and country, (2) the gap between workers and peasants, and (3) the gap between manual and mental labor.

Drawing on the Daqing experience, China encouraged rammed-earth construction in the mid-1960s. Starting in 1964, Mao Zedong advocated for a "mass design revolution movement". In the context of the Sino-Soviet split, Mao urged that planners should avoid the use of Soviet-style prefabricated materials and instead embrace the proletarian spirit of on-site construction using rammed earth. The Communist Party promoted the use of rammed-earth construction as a low-cost method which was indigenous to China and required little technical skill.

During the Third Front campaign to develop strategic industries in China's rugged interior to prepare for potential invasion by the United States or Soviet Union, Planning Commission Director Li Fuchun instructed project leaders to make do with what was available, including building rammed-earth housing so that more resources could be directed to production. This policy came to be expressed through the slogan, "First build the factory and afterward housing."

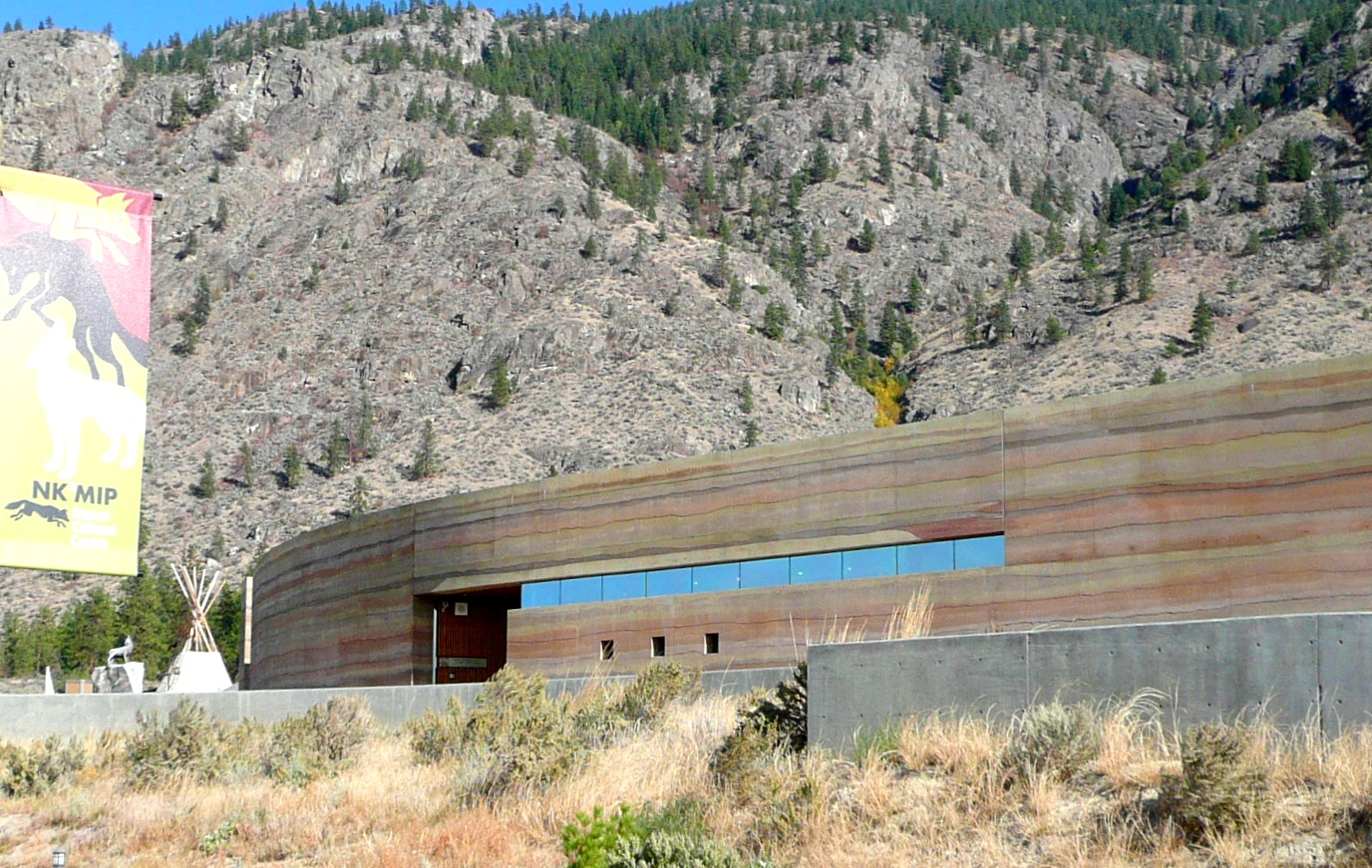
Nk'Mip Desert Cultural Centre in Osoyoos, British Columbia, Canada, completed in 2006

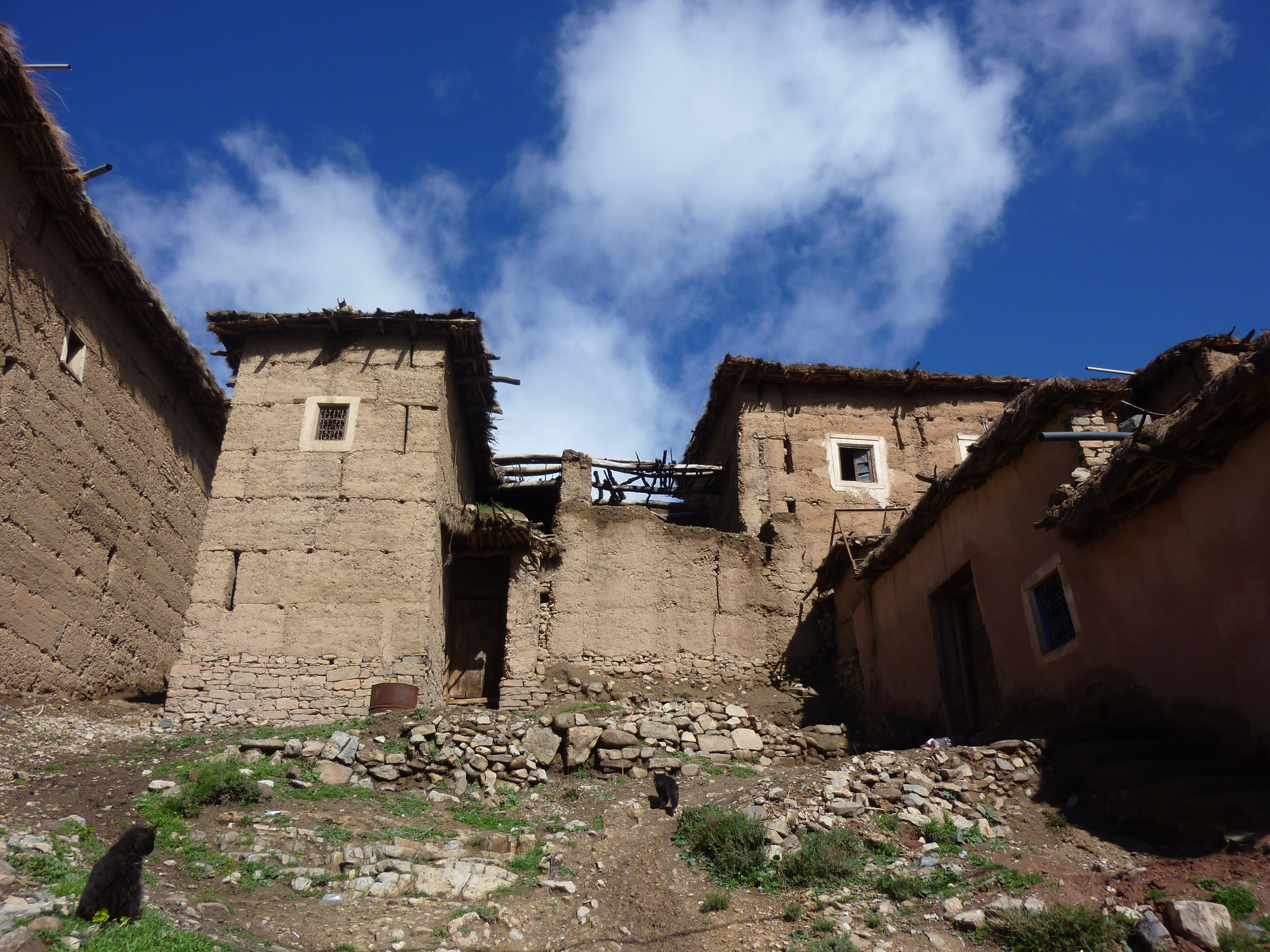
"Pisé" houses of rammed earth in Tabant, Morocco; the technique is called "tabut" there.

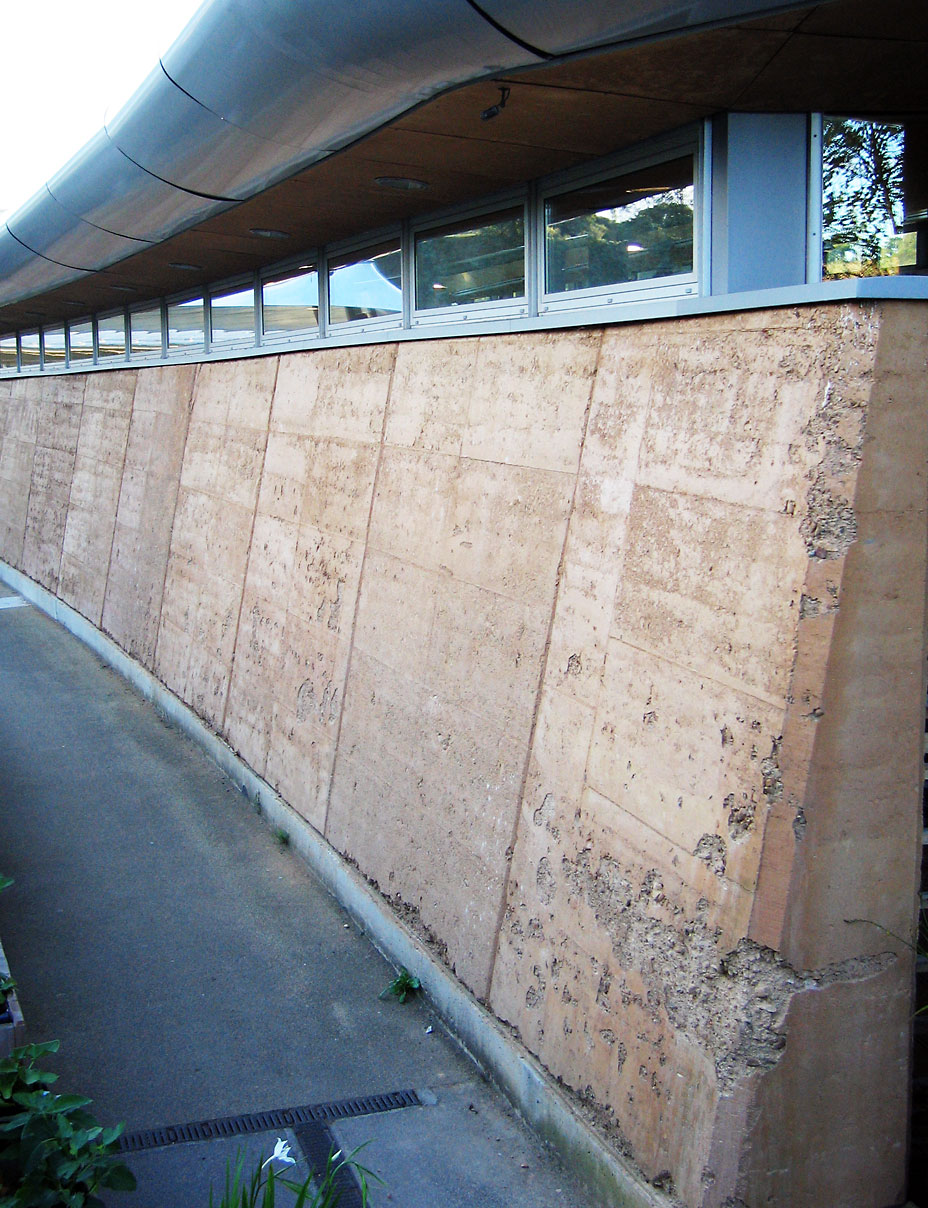
Rammed-earth walls form part of the entrance edifice of the Eden Project in Cornwall, England, UK

=== United Kingdom ===
Julian Keable and his son Professor Rowland Keable have contributed significant scholarship and research to the field of rammed earth in the UK.

=== Africa ===
Earth structures have been an important autochthonous building technology across the continent for millennia, but no building codes existed to encourage its use in the post-industrial era. In the late 1970s, British architect Julian Keable was asked for his opinion on building without cement for the new Tanzanian capital Dodoma. He referred back to Clough Williams-Ellis' seminal work and discarded all but the pisé, generally called rammed earth. This led to pilot projects in Tanzania, Sierra Leone, Ghana, Kenya, Uganda and Malawi through the late 1970s until the early 1990s. Towards the end of that time he became the project manager of the Overseas Development Agency's project to codify rammed-earth techniques in an African context, which became Rammed Earth Structures: A Code of Practice. The code of practice became a national standard in Zimbabwe, then a Southern African Development Community Standard, and finally Keable's book was adopted as an African Regional Standard.

=== Europe ===
In Europe, especially in France, the United Kingdom and Germany, traditional rammed earth is experiencing a resurgence in contemporary architecture. Several modern buildings have been constructed using traditional rammed-earth techniques, including notable examples such as a three-storey home built in Austria in 2008. Historically, rammed earth (known as "pisé de terre" in French) was a common building technique in parts of Europe, particularly in rural areas where access to other building materials was limited. Many historical rammed-earth structures still remain throughout Europe, particularly in France, Spain, and Germany, demonstrating the durability of the technique when properly maintained. The modern European revival of rammed earth is closely tied to the growth of sustainable architecture movements and interest in traditional building techniques. Contemporary European rammed-earth buildings are often designed as showcase projects that demonstrate the aesthetic and environmental qualities of the material, though they remain relatively rare compared to conventional construction methods.

=== Latin America ===
While there is no confirmed archaeological evidence supporting the development of frame-formed rammed earth construction in what is today known as Latin America prior to the European colonization in the 16th century, Indigenous Americans across the region made extensive use of layered or stacked wet earth construction techniques to produce monolithic structures of varying scales. The best preserved examples of this technique of layered wet earthen construction, commonly referred to as “tierra apilada” in Spanish, are concentrated in the Mesoamerican and Andean cultural regions of the pre-Columbian Americas. Archaeological excavations at the Olmec site of San Lorenzo in the modern-day Mexican state of Veracruz reveal the use of monolithic tierra apilada in the construction of Palacio Rojo residential complex dated to between 1500 and 100 BCE. In the Andean region of the 1500s CE, the Inca made extensive use of compacted raw earth construction techniques at sites such as Tambo Colorado in coastal Peru and Batungasta in Argentina.

With European colonization of the Americas came the introduction of tapial, or true frame-formed rammed earthen construction, to the region. One of the earliest surviving examples of true rammed earthen construction in Latin America can be found at the early 16th century site of the Hospital San Nicolás de Bari in the Dominican Republic’s capital city of Santo Domingo. The Spanish conquest of Mexico in the 1520s expanded rammed earth construction from the Caribbean and into the mainland Americas, becoming an established construction technique in central Mexico alongside the more widely adopted adobe construction. By the 1530s, the Spanish introduced rammed earth construction to South America, becoming particularly widespread in the Andean region for use in the construction of varying architectural typologies and environments: from historical private residences in towns such as Colombia’s Barichara and Cepitá, to religious buildings such as the Church of San Miguel de Piura in Peru.

== See also ==
- Adobe – Building material of earth and organic materials
- Alker – Earth-based stabilized building material
- Cob (material) – Building material made of soil and fiber
- Earth sheltering – House partially or entirely surrounded by earth
- Green building – Environmentally responsible construction principles
- Mudbrick – Earth blocks for construction
- Compressed earth block – Building material
- Polymer soil stabilization – Engineering technique
- Sustainable architecture – Architecture designed to minimize environmental impact
- Vernacular architecture – Architecture based on local needs, materials, traditions
- Craterre – French research laboratory

== External sources ==
- Rammed earth wall construction at Central Arizona College
- Why Build Rammed Earth Homes?
