= Church of the Holy Cross (Stateburg, South Carolina) =

Historic church in South Carolina, United States

- U.S. National Register of Historic Places
- U.S. National Historic Landmark
- U.S. Historic district – Contributing property
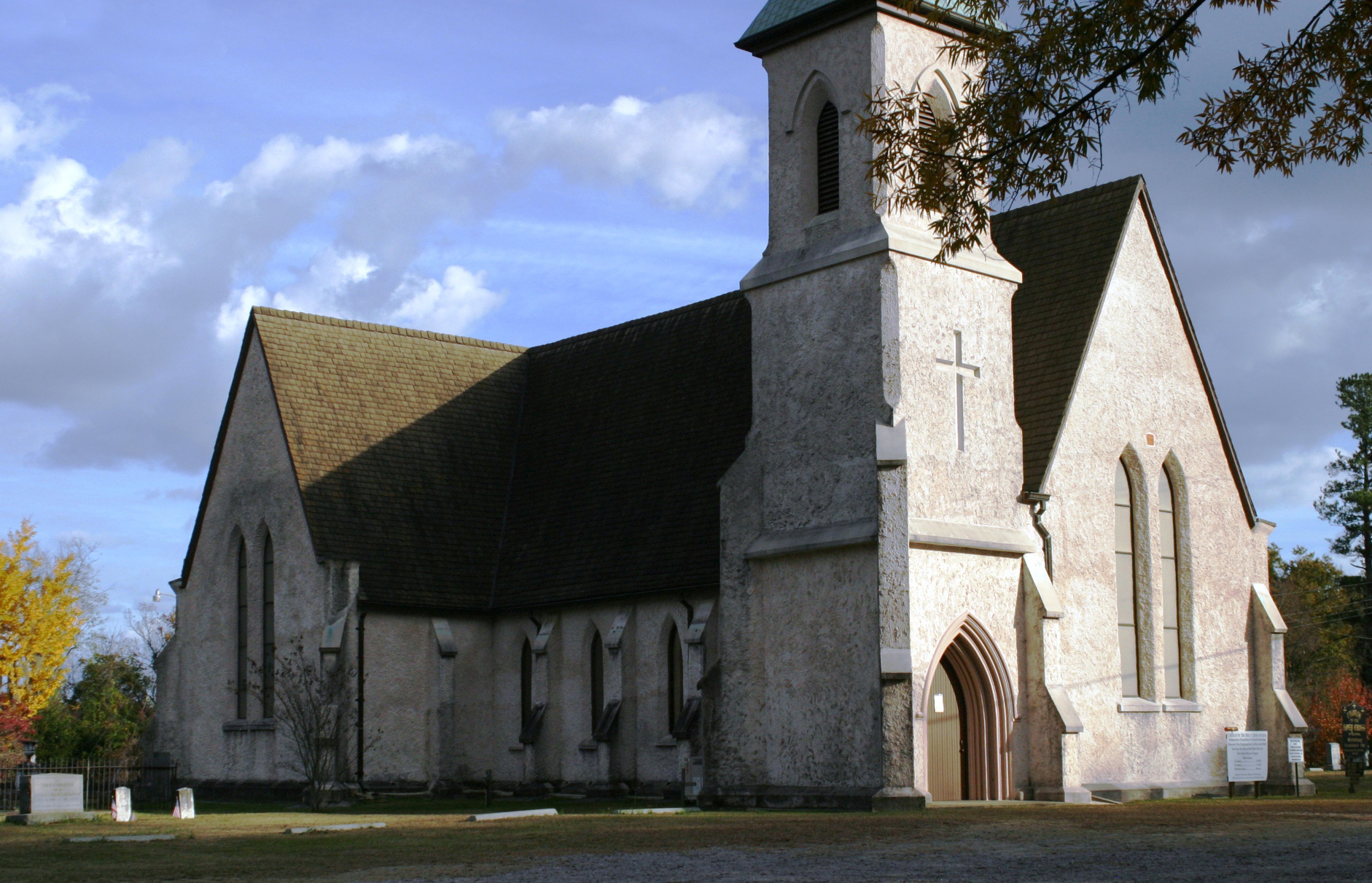
- Historic Church of the Holy Cross
- Location: SC 261, 335 N. Kings Hwy. Stateburg, South Carolina
- Coordinates: 33°57′12″N 80°31′56″W
- Built: 1850–1852
- Part of: Stateburg Historic District (ID71000809)
- NRHP reference No.: 73001732

Significant dates
- Added to NRHP: November 7, 1973
- Designated NHL: November 7, 1973
- Designated CP: February 24, 1971

The Church of the Holy Cross is a historic Anglican church at 335 North Kings Highway in Stateburg, South Carolina. Built in 1850-52 to a design by noted South Carolina architect Edward C. Jones, it is a notable example of rammed earth construction with relatively high style Gothic Revival styling. It was designated a National Historic Landmark for its architecture in 1973.

In 2013, the Church of the Holy Cross disaffiliated with the Episcopal Church over disagreement with its direction. The conservative congregation realigned with the Anglican Church in North America.

== Description and history ==
The church stands on the east side of North Kings Highway, west of the city of Sumter. Its walls, constructed of yellow rammed earth, stand 40 feet (12 m) tall, and are covered in stucco, with buttressing at the corners and long sides of its cruciform plan. A tower stands attached to one end, and the steeply pitched roof is finished in tile. Window and door openings are in the shape of Gothic arches. The church interior is painted gray in a manner resembling stone.

The church was built in 1850-52 on land donated earlier by American Revolutionary War General Thomas Sumter. It was designed by Edward C. Jones, one of South Carolina's leading architects. Although he was a prolific designer, a relatively small number of his works survive.

Across the road from the church is Borough House Plantation, the historic home and property of Dr. William Wallace Anderson, chairman of the committee that built the church. In 1820, Dr. Anderson had built his own house of rammed earth on his plantation, plus additional outbuildings of the same construction. Several of these survive, and the plantation complex has also been designated as a National Historic Landmark. These landmarks are both included within what is now known as the Stateburg Historic District.

The Church of the Holy Cross is still an active parish. In 2013, it disaffiliated from the Episcopal Church over its direction. The conservative congregation realigned with the Anglican Church in North America, part of the Anglican realignment. The current rector is Fr. Michael E. Ridgill, priest.

An 18-month, $2.3 million restoration to repair extensive termite damage was completed in late January 2010 under former rector the Rev. Fr. Thomas W. Allen. The church has its original Erben pipe organ, installed in 1851.

== Notable burials ==
- Joel Roberts Poinsett (March 2, 1779 – December 12, 1851), physician, botanist and American statesman. The Poinsettia is named for him.
- George L. Mabry, Jr. (September 14, 1917 – July 13, 1990), Major General, U.S. Army. Medal of Honor recipient.

== See also ==
- National Register of Historic Places listings in Sumter County, South Carolina
- List of National Historic Landmarks in South Carolina
