= Stateburg, South Carolina =

- CDP
- Location within the state of South Carolina
- Coordinates: 33°59′40″N 80°31′47″W
- Country: United States
- State: South Carolina
- County: Sumter

Area
  - Total: 4.69 sq mi (12.14 km^{2})
  - Land: 4.66 sq mi (12.06 km^{2})
  - Water: 0.031 sq mi (0.08 km^{2})
- Elevation: 177 ft (54 m)

Population (2020)
  - Total: 1,593
  - Density: 342.1/sq mi (132.09/km^{2})
- Time zone: UTC-5 (Eastern (EST))
  - Summer (DST): UTC-4 (EDT)
- ZIP code: 29150
- Area codes: 803, 839
- FIPS code: 45-69010
- GNIS feature ID: 2402895

Stateburg is a census-designated place (CDP) in the High Hills of Santee in Sumter County, South Carolina, United States. The population was 1,380 at the 2010 census. It is included in the Sumter, South Carolina Metropolitan Statistical Area. Stateburg is located within the larger Stateburg Historic District.

== History ==
Stateburg is located within a larger area where many notable colonial & early South Carolinians owned homes to escape summertime malaria & other illnesses, High Hills of Santee. In the 1780s, after the South Carolina General Assembly decided to move the state capital from Charleston to the central part of the state, Stateburg lost by only a few votes to Granby's Ferry, a small town on the Congaree River near the confluence of the Broad and Saluda rivers. Granby's Ferry was soon renamed Columbia, which is still the capital.

In 1785, Stateburg became the county seat of Claremont County and served as such until Claremont County was dissolved in 1800.

Borough House Plantation and Church of the Holy Cross are listed on the National Register of Historic Places.

== Geography ==
According to the United States Census Bureau, the CDP has a total area of 4.7 square miles (12.2 km^{2}), of which 4.7 square miles (12.1 km^{2}) is land and 0.04 square mile (0.1 km^{2}) (0.43%) is water.

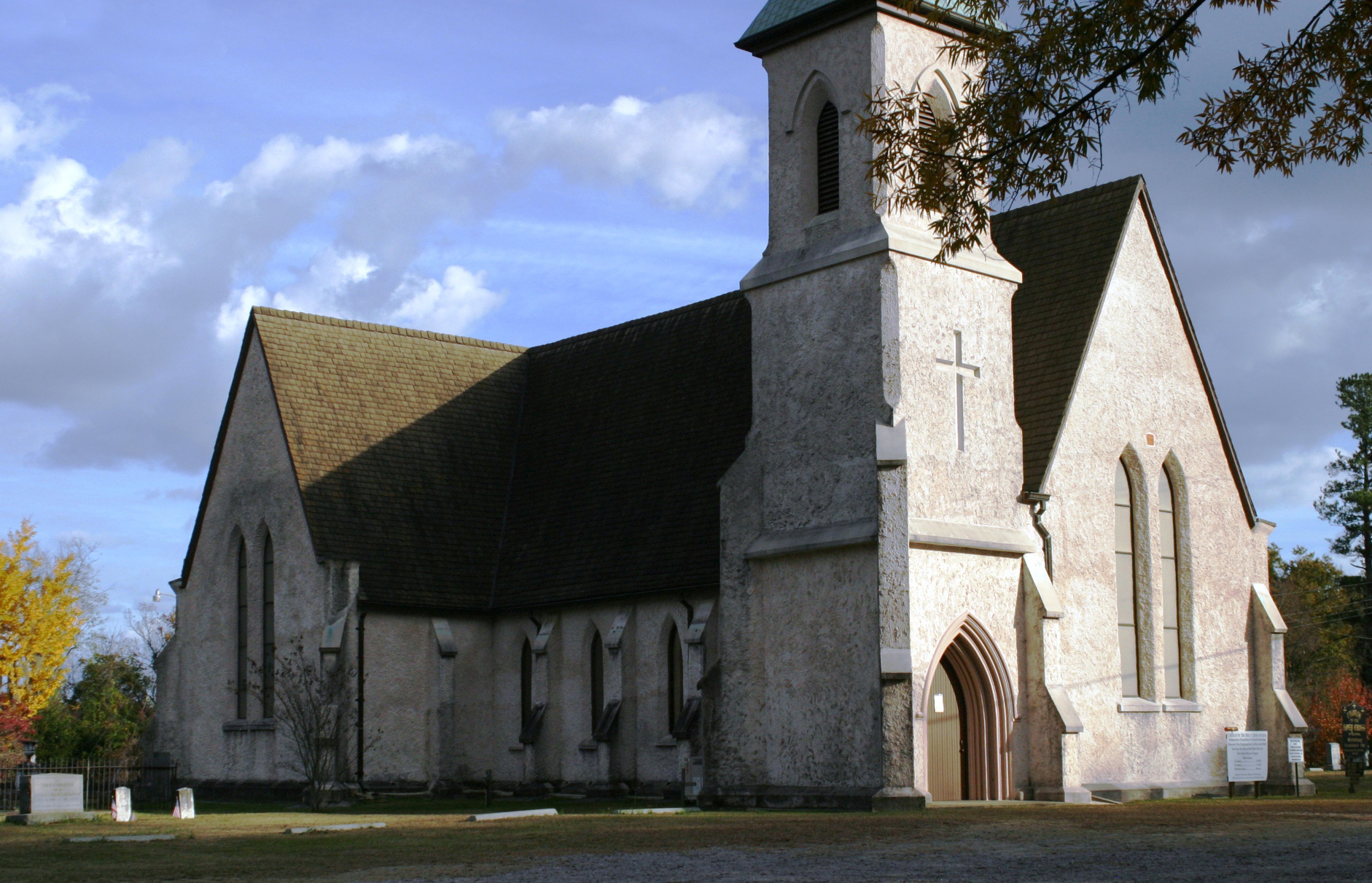
Historic Church of the Holy Cross, High Hills of the Santee, Stateburg. It is built of rammed earth.

== Demographics ==
Historical population
Census	Pop.	Note	%±
2020	1,593		—
U.S. Decennial Census

As of the census of 2000, there were 1,264 people, 461 households, and 389 families residing in the CDP. The population density was 270.3 inhabitants per square mile (104.4/km^{2}). There were 477 housing units at an average density of 102.0 per square mile (39.4/km^{2}). The racial makeup of the CDP was 72.55% White, 22.71% African American, 0.55% Native American, 2.06% Asian, 0.08% Pacific Islander, 0.32% from other races, and 1.74% from two or more races. Hispanic or Latino of any race were 2.69% of the population.

There were 461 households, out of which 38.6% had children under the age of 18 living with them, 73.5% were married couples living together, 6.5% had a female householder with no husband present, and 15.6% were non-families. 13.2% of all households were made up of individuals, and 2.2% had someone living alone who was 65 years of age or older. The average household size was 2.74, and the average family size was 2.99.

In the CDP, the population was distributed as follows: 26.8% under 18, 6.6% aged 18 to 24, 30.1% aged 25 to 44, 29.9% aged 45 to 64, and 6.6% aged 65 or older. The median age was 38 years. For every 100 females, there were 98.7 males. For every 100 females aged 18 and over, there were 96.4 males.

The median income for a household in the CDP was $59,152, and the median income for a family was $59,196. Males had a median income of $42,431 versus $26,875 for females. The per capita income for the CDP was $23,617. None of the families and 1.2% of the population were living below the poverty line, including no under-eighteen-year-olds and 7.9% of those over 64.

== Notable people ==
- Richard H. Anderson, Confederate Army general
- Mary Boykin Chesnut, author of a noted diary that chronicled life in the South during the Civil War
- William Ellison, cotton gin maker and freed slave turned enslaver.
- Stephen Decatur Miller, U.S. congressman, state governor, and U.S. senator
- Joel Roberts Poinsett, congressman, physician, and botanist who died in Stateburg
- Thomas Sumter, American Revolutionary War general
