= National Register of Historic Places listings in Sumter County, South Carolina =

Location of Sumter County in South Carolina

This is a list of the National Register of Historic Places listings in Sumter County, South Carolina.

This is intended to be a complete list of the properties and districts on the National Register of Historic Places in Sumter County, South Carolina, United States. The locations of National Register properties and districts for which the latitude and longitude coordinates are included below, may be seen in a map.

There are 29 properties and districts listed on the National Register in the county, including 3 National Historic Landmarks.

This National Park Service list is complete through NPS recent listings posted December 12, 2025.

== Current listings ==
	Name on the Register	Image	Date listed	Location	City or town	Description
1	Borough House Plantation	Borough House Plantation	March 23, 1972 (#72001224)	South Carolina Highway 261, 0.8 miles north of its intersection with Secondary Road 76/3 78; 33°57′14″N 80°32′16″W	Stateburg	
2	J. Clinton Brogdon House	J. Clinton Brogdon House	July 1, 1993 (#93000585)	3755 Boots Branch Rd. 33°48′34″N 80°15′52″W	Sumter	
3	Carnegie Public Library	Carnegie Public Library	August 5, 1994 (#94000814)	219 W. Liberty St. 33°55′14″N 80°20′47″W	Sumter	
4	Ellerbe's Mill	Ellerbe's Mill	November 20, 1974 (#74001880)	About 3 miles south of Rembert off U.S. Route 521 on Rafting Creek; 34°04′10″N 80°31′50″W	Rembert	
5	Goodwill Parochial School	Goodwill Parochial School	May 30, 1997 (#97000523)	295 N. Brick Church Rd. 33°54′44″N 80°08′19″W	Mayesville	
6	Heriot-Moise House	Heriot-Moise House	December 21, 1989 (#89002149)	Junction of U.S. Route 401 and Brewington Rd. 33°57′36″N 80°18′28″W	Sumter	
7	Holy Cross Episcopal Church	Holy Cross Episcopal Church	November 7, 1973 (#73001732)	South Carolina Highway 261; 33°57′45″N 80°31′55″W	Stateburg	
8	Lenoir Store	Lenoir Store	July 3, 1997 (#97000744)	3240 Horatio Rd. 34°01′17″N 80°34′05″W	Horatio	
9	Lincoln High School	Lincoln High School	January 27, 2015 (#14001221)	20-26 Council St. 33°55′08″N 80°20′49″W	Sumter	
10	Magnolia Hall	Magnolia Hall	September 2, 1999 (#99000101)	2025 Horatio-Hagood Rd. 34°03′13″N 80°34′08″W	Hagood	
11	Charles T. Mason House	Charles T. Mason House	July 3, 1997 (#97000745)	111 Mason Croft; 33°55′50″N 80°21′39″W	Sumter	
12	Mayesville Historic District	Mayesville Historic District	July 16, 1979 (#79002395)	Irregular pattern along Lafayette St. 33°59′08″N 80°12′26″W	Mayesville	
13	Millford Plantation	Millford Plantation	November 19, 1971 (#71000808)	West of Pinewood on South Carolina Highway 261; 33°44′54″N 80°32′15″W	Pinewood	
14	Myrtle Moor		January 13, 1983 (#83002210)	Address Restricted	Sumter	
15	O'Donnell House	O'Donnell House	April 25, 1996 (#96000407)	120 E. Liberty St. 33°55′10″N 80°20′21″W	Sumter	
16	Orange Grove	Orange Grove	August 19, 1993 (#93000845)	Junction of South Carolina Highways 43 (Black River Rd.) and 441; 34°02′42″N 80°26′10″W	Dalzell	
17	Pinewood Depot	Pinewood Depot	June 10, 1997 (#97000535)	Junction of East Ave. and Clarke St. 33°44′25″N 80°27′47″W	Pinewood	
18	Poinsett State Park Historic District	Poinsett State Park Historic District	May 31, 2016 (#16000311)	6660 Poinsett Park Rd. 33°48′24″N 80°32′22″W	Wedgefield	
19	Rip Raps Plantation	Rip Raps Plantation	December 12, 1978 (#78002532)	East of Sumter on South Carolina Highway 378; 33°53′57″N 80°09′03″W	Sumter	
20	St. Mark's Church	St. Mark's Church	January 20, 1978 (#78002530)	West of Pinewood on South Carolina Highway 51; 33°44′50″N 80°30′40″W	Pinewood	
21	Salem Black River Presbyterian Church	Salem Black River Presbyterian Church	November 14, 1978 (#78003091)	East of Sumter on U.S. Route 521; 33°55′57″N 80°09′39″W	Sumter	
22	Henry Lee Scarborough House	Henry Lee Scarborough House	January 20, 1995 (#94001560)	425 N. Main St. 33°55′42″N 80°20′26″W	Sumter	
23	Singleton's Graveyard	Singleton's Graveyard	May 13, 1976 (#76001713)	6 miles south of Wedgefield off South Carolina Highway 261; 33°49′52″N 80°33′15″W	Wedgefield	
24	Stateburg Historic District	Stateburg Historic District	February 24, 1971 (#71000809)	Roughly bounded by U.S. Route 76 and South Carolina Highways 261 and 441; 33°58′13″N 80°30′51″W	Sumter	
25	Sumter County Courthouse	Sumter County Courthouse	June 16, 2004 (#04000619)	141 N. Main St. 33°55′28″N 80°20′29″W	Sumter	
26	Sumter Historic District	Sumter Historic District	April 21, 1975 (#75001707)	Commercial area centered around Main and Liberty Sts. 33°55′13″N 80°20′30″W	Sumter	
27	Sumter Town Hall-Opera House	Sumter Town Hall-Opera House	May 24, 1973 (#73001733)	N. Main St. 33°55′15″N 80°20′30″W	Sumter	
28	Temple Sinai	Temple Sinai	January 21, 1999 (#98001645)	11 Church St. 33°55′18″N 80°20′48″W	Sumter	
29	Elizabeth White House	Elizabeth White House	March 21, 1978 (#78002531)	421 N. Main St. 33°55′41″N 80°20′27″W	Sumter	

== See also ==
- List of National Historic Landmarks in South Carolina
- National Register of Historic Places listings in South Carolina
