= McElveen =

McElveen is a surname. Notable people with the surname include:

- Bubba McElveen (1928–2006), American politician
- Jermaine McElveen (born 1984), Canadian football player
- Joe McElveen (born 1946), American politician
- Pryor McElveen (1881–1951), American baseball player
- Thomas McElveen (born 1978), American politician
