= Maysville Historic District =

Maysville Historic District may refer to:

- Maysville Historic District (Mobile, Alabama), listed on the National Register of Historic Places (NRHP)
- Maysville Historic District (Maysville, Georgia), listed on the NRHP in Banks and Jackson counties

== See also ==
- Mayesville Historic District, Mayesville, South Carolina, listed on the NRHP in Sumter County
