= Mayesville, South Carolina =

- Town
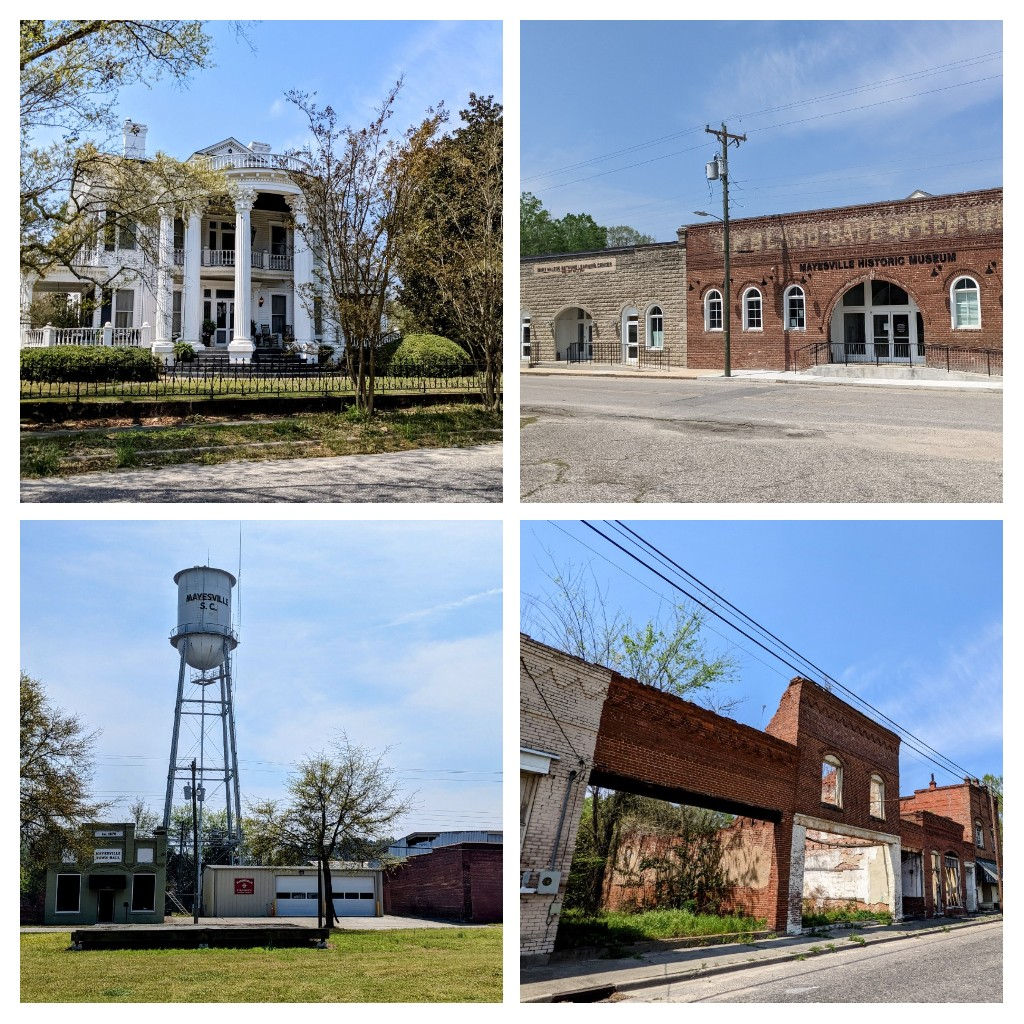
- Scenes in Mayesville

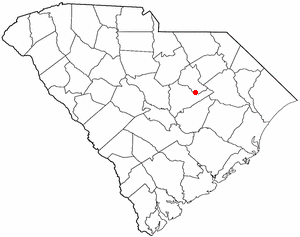
- Location of Mayesville, South Carolina
- Coordinates: 33°59′06″N 80°12′16″W
- Country: United States
- State: South Carolina
- County: Sumter

Area
  - Total: 1.02 sq mi (2.65 km^{2})
  - Land: 1.02 sq mi (2.65 km^{2})
  - Water: 0 sq mi (0.00 km^{2})
- Elevation: 141 ft (43 m)

Population (2020)
  - Total: 548
  - Density: 535.2/sq mi (206.66/km^{2})
- Time zone: UTC-5 (Eastern (EST))
  - Summer (DST): UTC-4 (EDT)
- ZIP code: 29104
- Area codes: 803, 839
- FIPS code: 45-45295
- GNIS feature ID: 2406113
- Website: https://mayesville.gov/

Mayesville is a town in Sumter County, South Carolina, United States. The population was 731 at the 2010 census, this was a decline from 1,001 in 2000. It is included in the Sumter, South Carolina Metropolitan Statistical Area.

== History ==
The town was named for the Mayes family of early settlers after the Wilmington and Manchester Railroad cut through the Mayes' property and began as Mayes Station in 1852, replacing an earlier name of Bradleyville, South Carolina.

Fortunes made in cotton and tobacco created wealthy landowners in this area of South Carolina. Mayesville served the local area as a place to process and sell these products and to obtain supplies. Merchants such as I.W. Bradley, Witherspoon Cooper and Isaac Strauss opened some of the earliest businesses in town. The town suffered greatly during the Civil War but thrived again for several decades beginning in about 1880.

The patriarch of the Mayes family, Matthew Peterson Mayes II, known as "the Squire," had been a merchant in Raleigh, North Carolina, was wounded in the War of 1812, and then turned to farming. Purchasing an existing plantation prior to 1819, he turned this small beginning into an empire that would survive the Civil War. He died in 1879 and was buried in the historic cemetery at Salem Black River Presbyterian Church. His great-great grandson James Edgar Mayes, known locally as “Bubba Jim" presided over an 8,000-acre cotton plantation in Mayesville and served as president of the National Cotton Council before his death in 1994. His death was recognized by the South Carolina Legislature.

== Geography ==
According to the United States Census Bureau, the town has a total area of 1.0 square miles (2.7 km^{2}), all land.

== Demographics ==
Historical population
Census	Pop.	Note	%±
1880	396		—
1890	706		78.3%
1900	761		7.8%
1910	751		−1.3%
1920	839		11.7%
1930	649		−22.6%
1950	706		—
1960	750		6.2%
1970	757		0.9%
1980	663		−12.4%
1990	694		4.7%
2000	1,001		44.2%
2010	731		−27.0%
2020	548		−25.0%
U.S. Decennial Census

=== 2020 census ===
Mayesville town, South Carolina – Racial and ethnic composition Note: the US Census treats Hispanic/Latino as an ethnic category. This table excludes Latinos from the racial categories and assigns them to a separate category. Hispanics/Latinos may be of any race.
Race / Ethnicity (NH = Non-Hispanic)	Pop 2000	Pop 2010	Pop 2020	% 2000	% 2010	% 2020
White alone (NH)	127	109	97	12.69%	14.91%	17.70%
Black or African American alone (NH)	861	605	419	86.01%	82.76%	76.46%
Native American or Alaska Native alone (NH)	1	0	5	0.10%	0.00%	0.91%
Asian alone (NH)	3	1	0	0.30%	0.14%	0.00%
Native Hawaiian or Pacific Islander alone (NH)	0	0	0	0.00%	0.00%	0.00%
Other race alone (NH)	0	0	2	0.00%	0.00%	0.36%
Mixed race or Multiracial (NH)	3	0	15	0.30%	0.00%	2.74%
Hispanic or Latino (any race)	6	16	10	0.60%	2.19%	1.82%
Total	1,001	731	548	100.00%	100.00%	100.00%

=== 2000 census ===
As of the census of 2000, there were 1,001 people, 331 households, and 246 families residing in the town. The population density was 968.0 inhabitants per square mile (373.7/km^{2}). There were 369 housing units at an average density of 356.8 per square mile (137.8/km^{2}). The racial makeup of the town was 13.19% White, 86.01% African American, 0.10% Native American, 0.30% Asian, 0.10% from other races, and 0.30% from two or more races. Hispanic or Latino of any race were 0.60% of the population.

There were 331 households, out of which 35.6% had children under the age of 18 living with them, 36.9% were married couples living together, 31.4% had a female householder with no husband present, and 25.4% were non-families. 22.1% of all households were made up of individuals, and 9.1% had someone living alone who was 65 years of age or older. The average household size was 3.02 and the average family size was 3.60.

In the town, the population was spread out, with 30.6% under the age of 18, 10.7% from 18 to 24, 25.9% from 25 to 44, 21.1% from 45 to 64, and 11.8% who were 65 years of age or older. The median age was 35 years. For every 100 females, there were 83.7 males. For every 100 females age 18 and over, there were 74.2 males.

The median income for a household in the town was $25,852, and the median income for a family was $27,321. Males had a median income of $21,964 versus $20,313 for females. The per capita income for the town was $10,738. About 29.6% of families and 36.5% of the population were below the poverty line, including 49.5% of those under age 18 and 16.2% of those age 65 or over.

== Arts and culture ==
Goodwill Parochial School and Mayesville Historic District are listed on the National Register of Historic Places. The Kineen Hotel is one of the more significant historic buildings still standing.

== Notable people ==
- Mary McLeod Bethune - educator and civil rights activist
- James McBride Dabbs - author
- Archie Reese - defensive tackle, mostly for the San Francisco 49ers
- McKinley Washington Jr. - Presbyterian minister and politician
