= Wedgefield, South Carolina =

Coordinates: 33.893°N 80.518°W

- Unincorporated community Census designated place
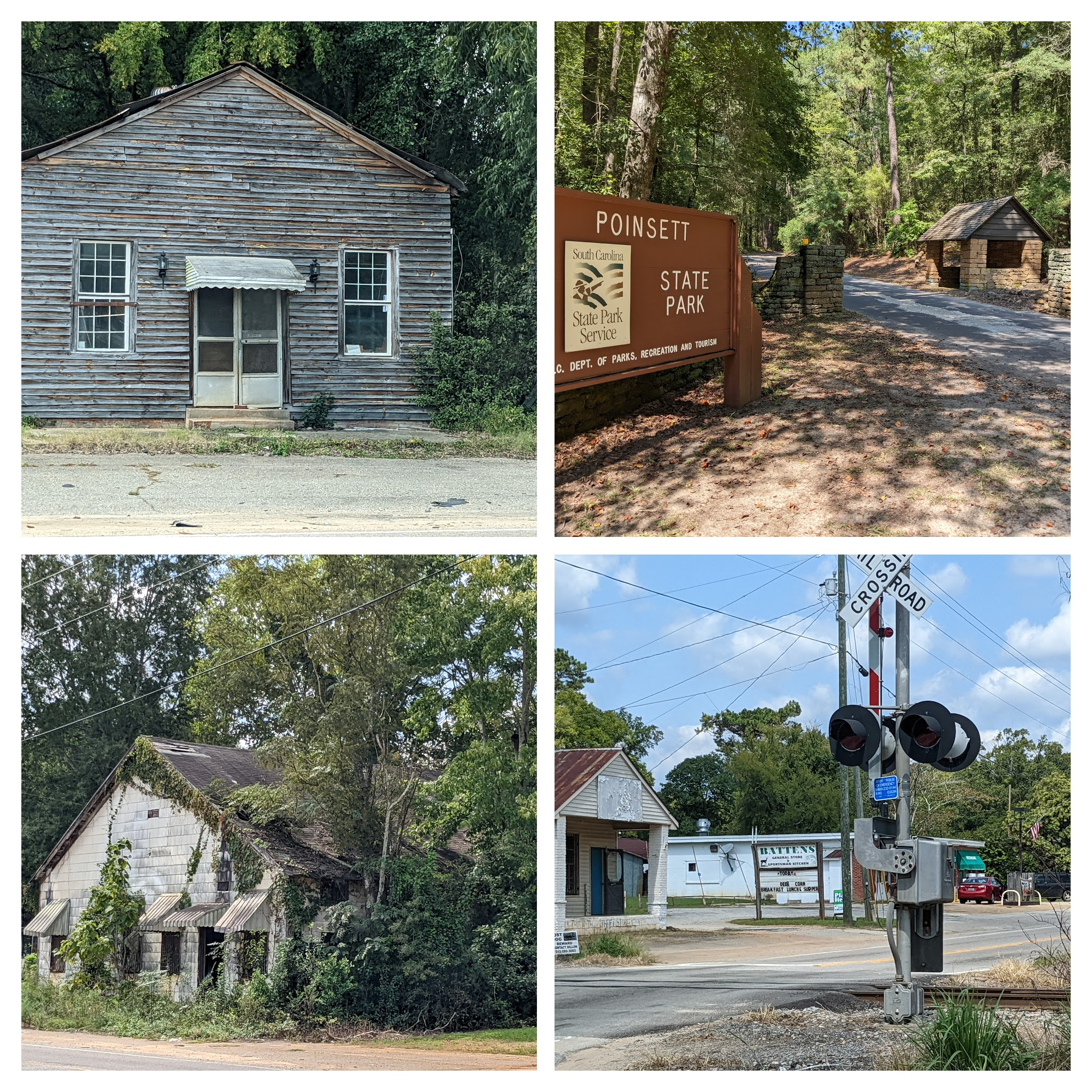
- Interactive map of Wedgefield, South Carolina
- Country: United States
- State: South Carolina
- County: Sumter

Area
  - Total: 73.23 sq mi (189.7 km^{2})
  - Land: 71.9 sq mi (186 km^{2})
  - Water: 0.33 sq mi (0.85 km^{2})
- Elevation: 226 ft (69 m)

Population (2000)
  - Total: 3,376
- Time zone: UTC-5 (Eastern (EST))
  - Summer (DST): UTC-4 (EDT)
- Zip Code: 29168
- GNIS feature ID: 2402991

Wedgefield is an unincorporated community and census designated place (CDP) in the High Hills of Santee area in western Sumter County, South Carolina, United States. Wedgefield is also a Census Designated Place (CDP). Wedgefield was so named because its location was likened to a "wedge" into the High Hills of Santee. In the 18th and 19th centuries it was the location of many plantations, notably those of the Singleton family, which produced First Lady of the United States, Angelica Singleton Van Buren. Today the plantations are gone except for their cemeteries and Wedgefield is today noted as the location of a state park, a state forest and other recreational places. When the railroad came through in the 19th century, the commercial center of Wedgefield developed at the intersection of the railroad, Kings Highway (South Carolina Highway 261) and Wedgefield Road (South Carolina Highway 763). It has its own post office with the Zip Code of 29168.

Wedgefield had a population of 3,376 in 2000 on a Zip Code-based estimate. Housing units were 1,343. Land area is 71.9 square miles (186 km^{2}) while water area is 0.33 square miles.

== Demographics ==
Wedgefield first appeared as a census designated place in the 2010 U.S. census.

=== 2020 census ===
Wedgefield CDP, South Carolina – Racial and ethnic composition Note: the US Census treats Hispanic/Latino as an ethnic category. This table excludes Latinos from the racial categories and assigns them to a separate category. Hispanics/Latinos may be of any race.
Race / Ethnicity (NH = Non-Hispanic)	Pop 2010	Pop 2020	% 2010	% 2020
White alone (NH)	1,022	876	63.28%	58.13%
Black or African American alone (NH)	509	469	31.52%	31.12%
Native American or Alaska Native alone (NH)	3	6	0.19%	0.40%
Asian alone (NH)	18	9	1.11%	0.60%
Pacific Islander alone (NH)	0	0	0.00%	0.00%
Other race alone (NH)	1	10	0.06%	0.66%
Mixed race or Multiracial (NH)	33	93	2.04%	6.17%
Hispanic or Latino (any race)	29	44	1.80%	2.92%
Total	1,615	1,507	100.00%	100.00%

== Places of interest ==
- High Hills Outdoor Center of the Palmetto Conservation Foundation is located at 2070 SC 261 South. in Wedgefield. It is the center for the High Hills of Santee Passage of the Palmetto Trail.
- Manchester State Forest, which extends into Clarendon County, is based in Wedgefield off SC 261 south at 6740 Headquarters Road.
- Poinsett State Park is located off SC 261 south at 6660 Poinsett Park Road, Wedgefield

== Transportation ==
South Carolina Highway 261, Kings Highway, is the main north–south road in Wedgefield. It runs north to Stateburg and south to Pinewood. Wedgefield Road (South Carolina Highway 763) begins in Wedgefield and runs east to Sumter. CSX Transportation, formerly the Seaboard Coast Line Railroad runs into Wedgefield from Sumter just north of Wedgefield Road and continues to the west. There is no passenger service to Wedgefield.

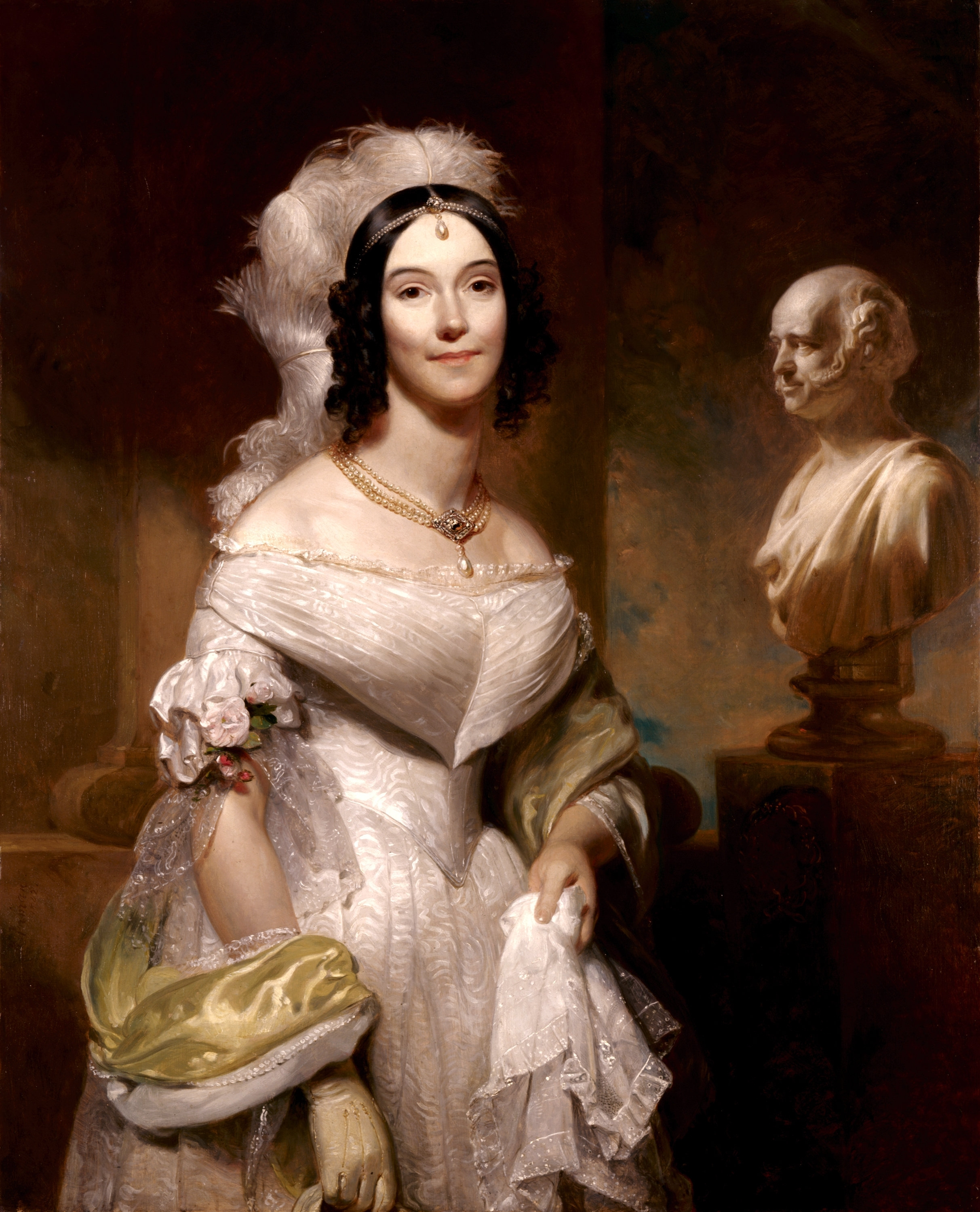
Portrait of Sarah Angelica Singleton Van Buren by Henry Inman (1842)

== Notable people ==
- Richard Irvine Manning III, (1859-1931), Governor of South Carolina.
- Wyndham Meredith Manning, (1890-1967), South Carolina politician and son of Richard Irvine Manning III, born in Wedgefield.
- Angelica Singleton Van Buren, (1818–1877), First Lady of the United States, born and married in Wedgefield.

== Cemeteries ==
Cemeteries in the Wedgefield area include:

- Singleton's Graveyard is on the National Register of Historic Places
- Troublefield Family Cemetery
- Wedgefield Baptist Church Cemetery
- Wedgefield Methodist Church Cemetery
- Wedgefield Presbyterian Church Cemetery

== Media ==
WIBZ is licensed to Wedgefield.
