= Lincoln High School (Sumter, South Carolina) =

Historic high school in South Carolina, US

- U.S. National Register of Historic Places
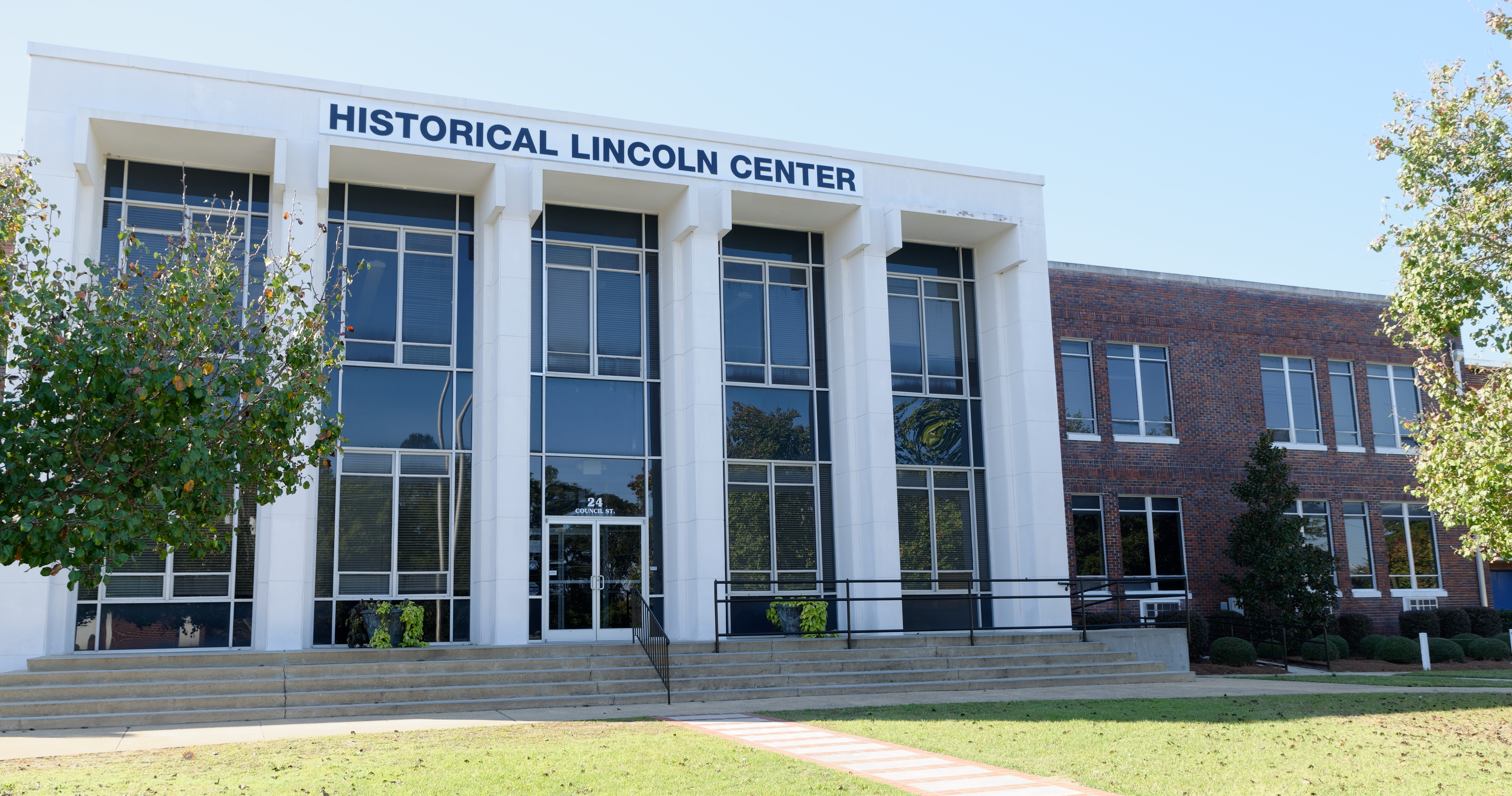

- Location within South Carolina Location within the United States
- Location: 20-26 Council St., Sumter, South Carolina
- Coordinates: 33°55′8″N 80°20′49″W
- Area: less than one acre
- Built: 1937
- NRHP reference No.: 14001221
- Added to NRHP: January 27, 2015

Lincoln High School is a historic school building at 20-26 Council Street in Sumter, South Carolina. Founded in 1874 with the current building constructed in 1937, the school served as an essential institution for the African American students until schools were integrated in 1969. It also played a significant role as a community center for civic meetings and social events. The building was listed on the National Register of Historic Places in 2015. As of 2025, the site operates as the Lincoln Museum & Heritage Complex, preserving and educating visitors about its historical significance.

== History ==
Lincoln High School traces its origins to the Lincoln School, established in 1874 as Sumter's first public educational institution dedicated specifically to African American students. Reverend L.E. Lowery served as the principal and instructor for male students, while Mrs. M.E. Scott taught female students. Initially housed in a modest two-story wooden building, the school's significance grew as it became central to education for African Americans in Sumter and surrounding rural communities throughout Sumter County.

Between 1910 and 1937, the nucleus of the current facility was constructed, supported significantly by Rosenwald Funds. Julius Rosenwald, in partnership with Booker T. Washington, established a widespread philanthropic effort to construct schools for underserved African American communities across the rural South. Lincoln was among the "Rosenwald Schools," benefiting from critical funds that enabled construction of essential classrooms and vocational shops.

In 1937, under the Works Progress Administration (WPA) and with additional Rosenwald support, Lincoln School transitioned fully into Lincoln High School, receiving a newly modernized facility designed to serve the educational needs of the community more effectively. By 1947, Lincoln School expanded its academic scope by adding a twelfth grade under Principal J.H. Kilgo, who initially came to the school to teach and organized teams for football and baseball. This development was significant, as many Rosenwald schools in rural Southern communities initially offered education only through the eighth grade due to limited funding and segregation-era disparities. By the late 1940s, some expanded to include higher grades, often through community advocacy and public investment. Lincoln's addition of a twelfth grade reflected this broader trend and provided a more complete high school education that remained uncommon for African Americans in rural areas.

From 1947 to 1969, Lincoln High School taught ninth through twelfth grade, serving as a critical hub for both academic and vocational training. The comprehensive curriculum included courses such as industrial arts, home economics, typing, and traditional academic subjects. Lincoln became renowned for its strong community traditions, especially its award-winning student newspaper, The Echo, and its celebrated yearbook, The Lincolnite. These publications documented school life and fostered a strong sense of school pride and student achievement, winning awards at prestigious journalism competitions at Columbia University.

In 1950, Lincoln High School significantly expanded with the construction of twenty additional classrooms, a cafeteria, a gymnasium, a library, and a band room. In 1952, it was accredited by the Southern Association of Colleges and Schools, a prestigious recognition that attested to its high academic standards.

The pivotal Briggs v. Elliott case, which originated in nearby Clarendon County, profoundly impacted Lincoln High School. Part of the broader landmark Brown v. Board of Education Supreme Court decision, Briggs v. Elliott challenged educational segregation and prompted South Carolina officials to enact “equalization” policies. As a result, Lincoln High School received significant state-funded improvements, including modern classrooms, advanced laboratories, and expanded library and cafeteria facilities designed to uphold the "separate but equal" doctrine after segregation ended.

Nevertheless, federal desegregation mandates following Brown v. Board of Education ultimately led to the integration of Sumter's public schools. In 1969, Lincoln High School graduated its last class. Following desegregation efforts stemming from the Brown decision, Lincoln merged with Edmunds High School to become Sumter High School, symbolizing local progress towards integration. The Lincoln facility continued to serve educational purposes; from 1970 to 1979, it housed all sophomores from Sumter High. In subsequent years, the building alternated between serving freshmen and sophomores again for Sumter High School until 1980. In 1983, it was sold to Sumter County. In 1989, it served as St. Jude Central High School, a Catholic private school, after which it was acquired by Trinity United Methodist Church in 1995.

In 2009, after dedicated efforts by alumni, the Lincoln High School Preservation Alumni Association acquired the property, committing themselves to preserving and celebrating the school's rich history. Their work culminated in the school's designation on the National Register of Historic Places in 2015.

== Notable alumni ==
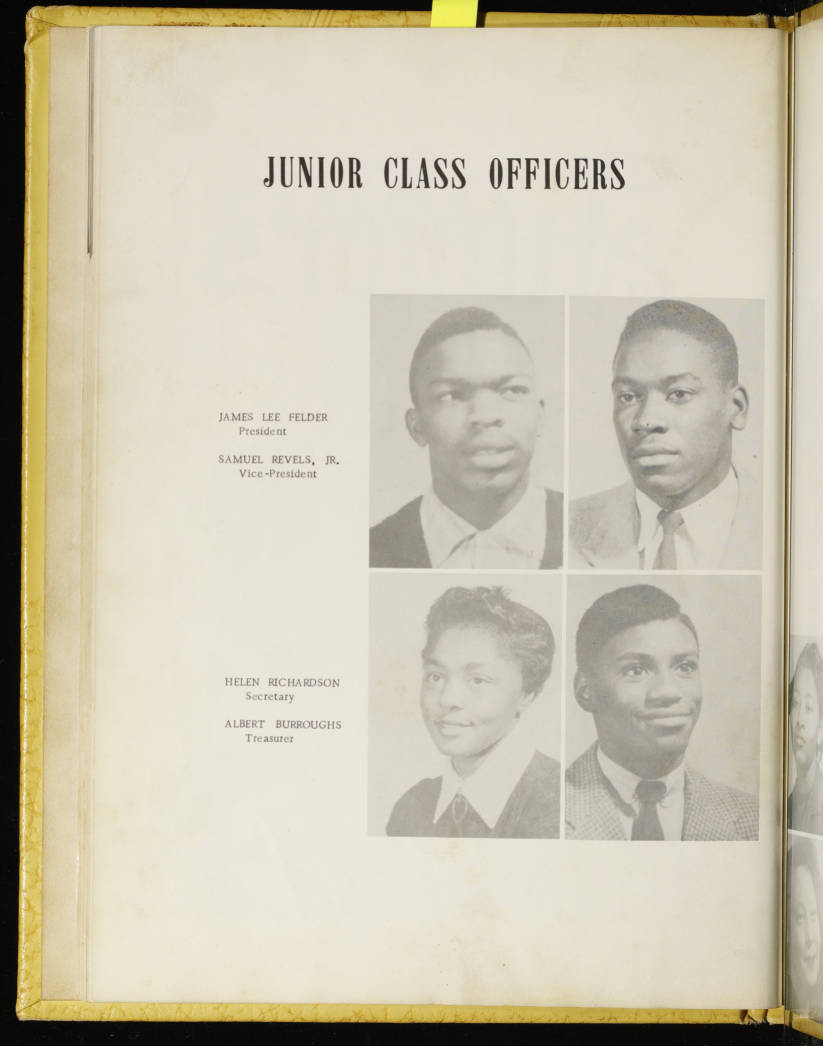
The Lincolnite 1955–1956, page 30, Junior Class officers. Featuring class president James Lee Felder, vice president Samuel Revels Jr., secretary Helen Richardson, and treasurer Albert Burroughs.

James L. Felder – A pioneering civil rights leader and political trailblazer, Felder played a key role in organizing student sit-ins in Atlanta during the 1960s while attending Clark College. As student body president, he worked alongside icons like Julian Bond and helped mobilize the Atlanta University Center. After graduating from Lincoln High School in 1957, Felder went on to become one of the first African Americans elected to the South Carolina state legislature since Reconstruction. As a part of his military service, he served as a pallbearer at President John F. Kennedy's funeral.

Leroy Bowman – An original Tuskegee Airman, 1st Lt. Bowman flew 36 combat missions over Europe in World War II with the 332nd Fighter Group, escorting bombers as part of the legendary "Red Tails," paving the way for racial integration in the U.S. military. Bowman earned degrees from Morris College and Hofstra University, becoming an educator and school administrator in New York. He was later honored with an Honorary Doctorate from Tuskegee University and awarded the Congressional Gold Medal by President George W. Bush in 2007.

Arthenia J. Bates Millican – A writer, scholar, and literary voice of the 20th century, Millican began publishing poetry while still a student at Lincoln High School. Her first poem appeared in The Sumter Daily Item at age 16. She later studied under Langston Hughes at Clark Atlanta University and became only the second Black woman to earn a Ph.D. in English from Louisiana State University. Millican's short stories and novels earned national acclaim, including a fellowship from the National Endowment for the Arts. Her work reflects the intersections of race, identity, and Southern life.

== Lincoln High School Preservation Alumni Association ==
The Lincoln High School Preservation Alumni Association was founded to preserve and promote the historical legacy of Lincoln High School. In 2009, the Association purchased the school building, facilitated by significant financial contributions, notably from donors George and Janet Miles. Their generous gift secured clear deed and title and supported the transformation of Lincoln High School into the Lurke Museum. Income helps fund the ongoing maintenance and restoration projects. The Association actively engages alumni and the wider Sumter community in preserving this important historical and cultural site.

== Legacy and Impact ==
Lincoln High School profoundly impacted the Sumter community, offering critical educational opportunities during segregation and serving as a cultural and social center. The school regularly hosted weekly dances, sporting events, parades, and its annual homecoming celebration. It also served as a venue for civic meetings, alumni gatherings, and holiday performances.

The school's alumni have made notable contributions to civil rights, literature, and education. Today, the Lincoln Museum & Heritage Complex, created through efforts led by the Lincoln High School Preservation Alumni Association, commemorates the school's rich heritage, documents the broader historical context of segregated education, and inspires future generations through exhibitions, cultural programs, and community engagement initiatives.

== See also ==
- National Register of Historic Places listings in Sumter County, South Carolina
