= Martha Priscilla Shaw =

American educator and politician

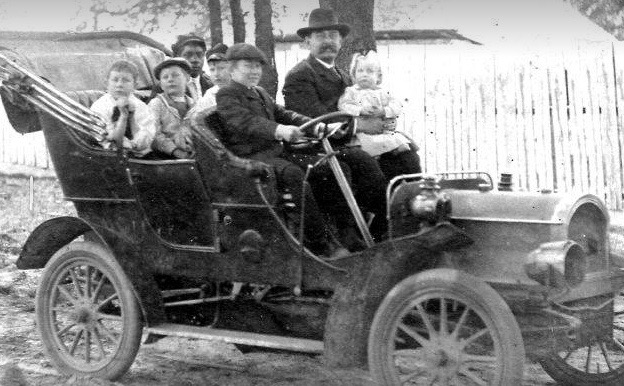
- in 1906 being driven by her brother whilst held by her father

Mayor of Sumter, South Carolina
- In office August 14, 1952 – August 23, 1956
- Preceded by: W. E. Bynum
- Succeeded by: S. A. Harvin

Personal details
- Born: August 29, 1904 Alcolu, South Carolina
- Died: February 9, 1981 (aged 76)
- Education: Agnes Scott College; Boston University

Martha Priscilla Shaw (August 29, 1904 – February 9, 1981) was an American educator and politician in the state of South Carolina. She served as mayor of Sumter, South Carolina between 1952 and 1956, thus becoming the first female mayor in South Carolina.

== Early life and education ==
Priscilla Shaw was born in 1904 in Alcolu, South Carolina, in Clarendon County to David Charles and Lula (Alderman) Shaw. Her maternal grandfather, D. W. Alderman, was a mill owner and founder of Alcolu.

She moved to Sumter in 1909, and she was educated in the Sumter Public Schools. She attended Agnes Scott College in Decatur, Georgia, for one year but ultimately graduated from the Sargent School of Physical Education, receiving her B.S. degree in 1925. She later did graduate work at Boston University in 1937.

== Career ==
Shaw taught physical education in the Sumter Public Schools from 1925 to 1939 and directed a summer camp for girls from 1929 to 1950.

Shaw became increasingly involved in service to her community and joined the Red Cross, the YWCA, and the Salvation Army, among others. Shaw was also a charter member of the local Junior Welfare League. In 1950, she was elected to the Sumter City Council, becoming the first woman to serve in that body. In 1952, she was elected Mayor of Sumter, succeeding W. E. Bynum and was sworn in on August 14, becoming the first female mayor in the entire state. She served in that position until August 23, 1956, and was succeeded by S.A Harvin In 1954, Shaw was one of three recipients of the national Mary Margaret McrBride award for women who have "expressed their Christian faith in active service for community improvement. She also served as a member of the Christian Social Relations Department of United Church Women.

In 1955 Mayor Shaw's invitation to all of the ministers of the community to attend a joint meeting in an effort to ease racial tensions in the city met with a formal rebuff from the white ministers, who, in a joint letter, called such a meeting "not wise." Most of white ministers did not attend.

== Personal life ==
Shaw died in 1981 at the age of 76. Her brother, Lt. Ervin David Shaw, was the namesake for Shaw Air Force Base.
