= Sumter County Courthouse =

Sumter County Courthouse may refer to:

- Sumter County Courthouse (Alabama), Livinston, Alabama
- Sumter County Courthouse (Florida), Bushnell, Florida
- Sumter County Courthouse (South Carolina), Sumter, South Carolina
