= Thomas McElveen =

American politician

Joseph Thomas McElveen, III

Member of the South Carolina Senate from the 35th district
- In office 2013–2024
- Preceded by: Phil P. Leventis
- Succeeded by: Jeffrey R. Graham

Personal details
- Born: February 17, 1978 (age 48) Sumter, South Carolina, U.S.
- Party: Democratic
- Parent: Joe McElveen
- Education: Davidson College; University of South Carolina
- Occupation: Attorney
- Website: Senator McElveen

Thomas McElveen (born February 17, 1978) is a former South Carolina state senator, representing the 35th district. He is a member of the Democratic Party.

== Personal life and education ==
McElveen earned a bachelor's degree from Davidson College in 2000 and a JD from the University of South Carolina in 2003. McElveen's father, Joe McElveen, is the mayor of Sumter, South Carolina.

== Career ==
McElveen served as both a prosecutor and public defender for Sumter County.

== Political career ==
McElveen served in the South Carolina Senate from 2012 to 2024. He served on the Senate Agriculture and Natural Resources, Corrections and Penology, Fish, Game and Forestry, Judiciary, and Rules committees.

In 2024, McElveen announced that he would not run for re-election. He was succeeded by Democrat Jeffrey R. Graham.
