= Joe McElveen =

American politician

Joseph McElveen Jr.

Mayor of Sumter, South Carolina
- In office November 2000 – November 2020
- Succeeded by: David Merchant

South Carolina House of Representatives
- In office 1986–1996

Personal details
- Born: October 19, 1946 (age 79) Sumter, South Carolina
- Spouse: Kathryn Watson
- Children: 2, including Thomas McElveen

Joseph T. McElveen, Jr. (born October 19, 1946) is an American politician and the former state representative from South Carolina. He was the mayor of Sumter, South Carolina who served for 20 years—from November 2000 to November 2020.

== Early life and education ==
McElveen was born in Sumter in 1946. He graduated from The Citadel (The Military College of South Carolina) in 1968. He earned a Juris Doctor degree at the University of South Carolina School of Law in 1971. McElvee served in the US Air Force until 1977, and received an honorable discharge.

== Career ==
McElveen served on the Sumter City council from 1984 to 1986 until he was elected in the South Carolina House of Representatives from 1986 to 1996. In November 2000, He was elected Mayor of Sumter, South Carolina. He announced in January 2020 he will not seek reelection in the November 2020 election.

== Personal life ==
McElveen is married to Kathryn (née Watson) McElveen since 1976, and they have two children, Thomas and Kate.
