= Elizabeth White House =

Historic house in South Carolina, United States

- U.S. National Register of Historic Places
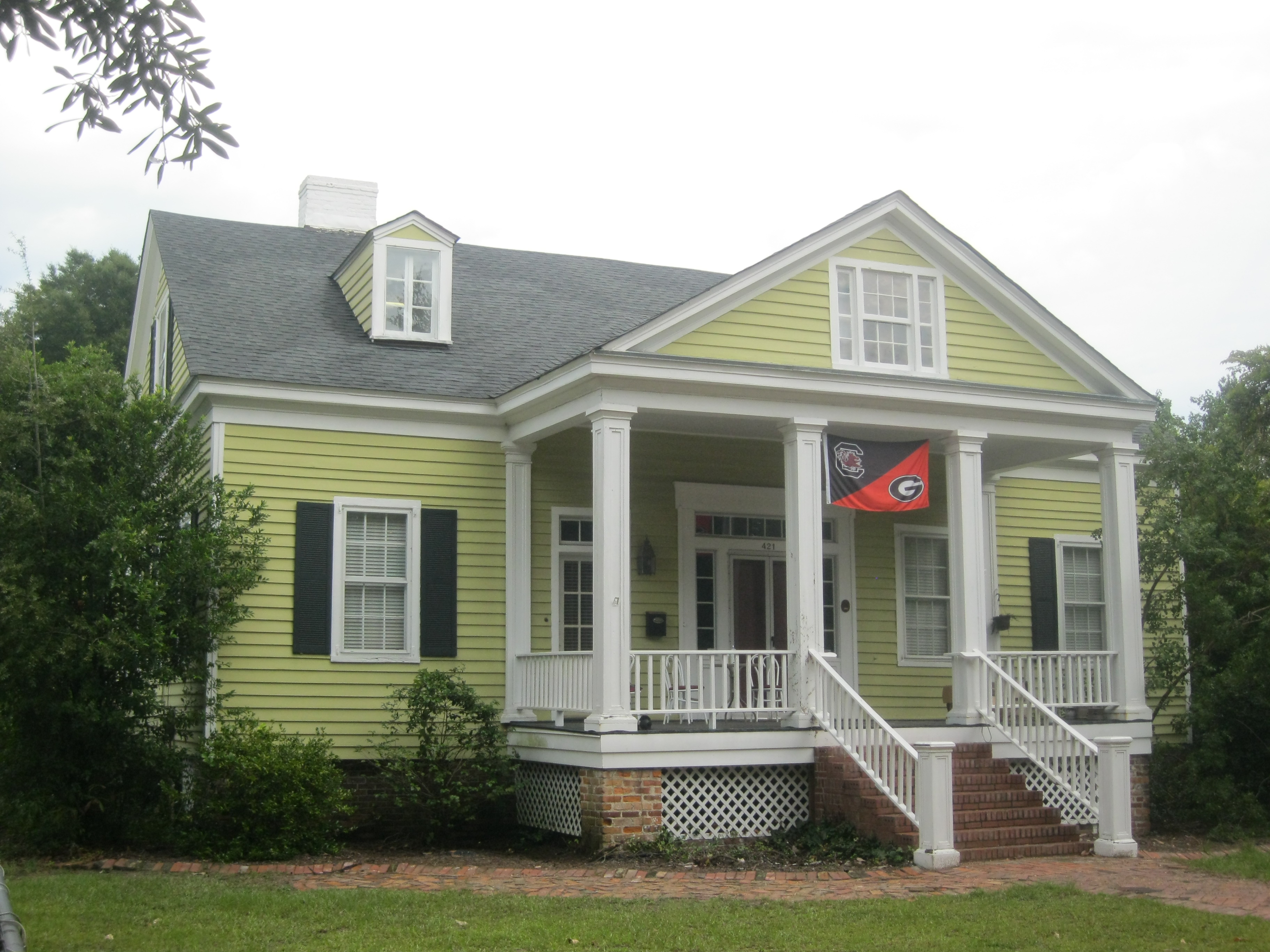

- Location within South Carolina Location within the United States
- Location: 421 N. Main St., Sumter, South Carolina
- Coordinates: 33°55′41″N 80°20′27″W
- Area: 3 acres (1.2 ha)
- Built: c. 1854
- Built by: John E. Brown
- Architectural style: Greek Revival
- NRHP reference No.: 78002531
- Added to NRHP: March 21, 1978

Elizabeth White House is a historic home in Sumter, Sumter County, South Carolina. It was built about 1854, and is a 1 1/2-story vernacular Greek Revival cottage. The front facade features a pedimented one-story portico supported by four square columns. It was the home of artist Elizabeth White (1883-1976). Under the provisions of White's will, the property was transferred to the Sumter Gallery of Art for use as an art gallery.

It was added to the National Register of Historic Places in 1978.
