= Bubba McElveen =

American politician

Wilson Ashby "Bubba" McElveen Jr. (1928 – November 9, 2006) was a politician and mayor of Sumter, South Carolina, United States.

McElveen first served on the city council in 1972. He was mayor from 1980 to 1988. Known as "Mayor Bubba", he moved the city council meetings from the mornings to the evenings so the public could attend. In 1986, he introduced single member districts to replace the at large elections that were previously used to elect the city council.

He was the first civilian to be named honorary Chief Master Sergeant of the US Air Force.
