= Carnegie Public Library (Sumter, South Carolina) =

- U.S. National Register of Historic Places
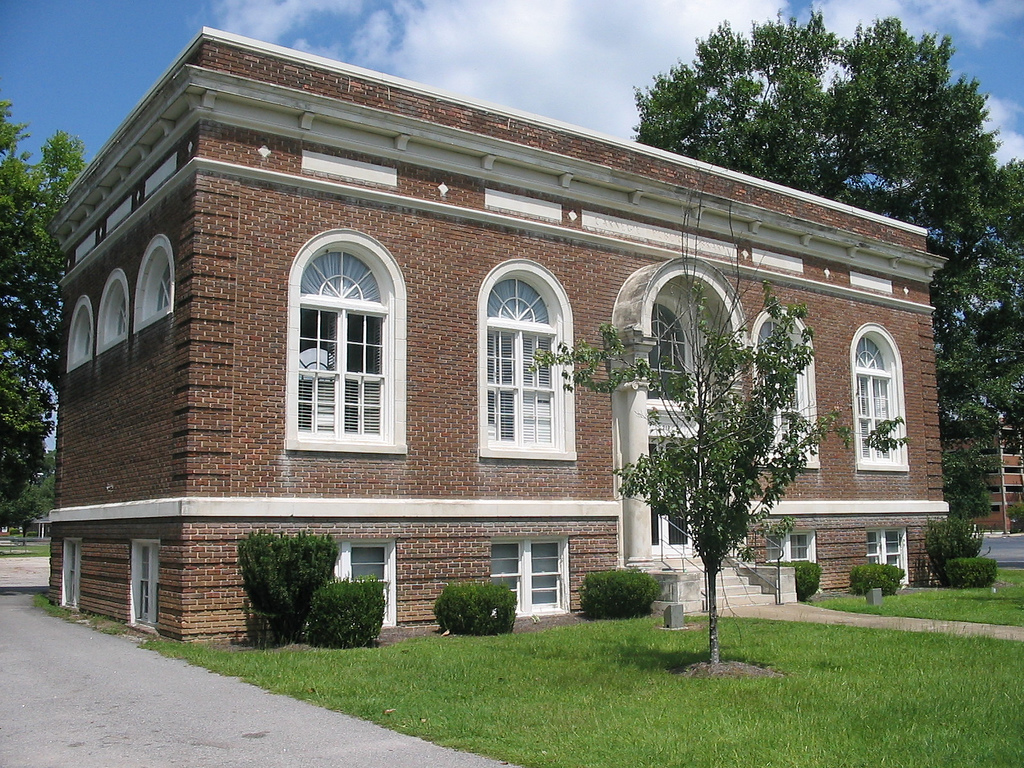

- Location within South Carolina Location within the United States
- Location: 219 W. Liberty St., Sumter, South Carolina
- Coordinates: 33°55′14″N 80°20′47″W
- Area: less than one acre
- Built: 1916-1917
- Architect: Johnson, J. Herbert; Walker, N.G.
- Architectural style: Beaux Arts
- NRHP reference No.: 94000814
- Added to NRHP: August 5, 1994

Carnegie Public Library is a historic Carnegie library building located at Sumter, Sumter County, South Carolina. It was built in 1916–1917, and is a two-story, brick Beaux-Arts style building. The front facade features four arched windows with limestone surrounds and the main entryway flanked by two Ionic order columns. It was one of the 1,679 public libraries built in the United States with funding from the Carnegie Corporation. The Sumter library was constructed with $10,000 provided by the Carnegie Corporation. It housed the public library until 1968, and afterwards housed a local genealogical society.

It was added to the National Register of Historic Places in 1994.

== See also ==
- Carnegie Public Library, located in Huntington, West Virginia
