= J. Clinton Brogdon House =

Historic house in South Carolina, United States

- U.S. National Register of Historic Places
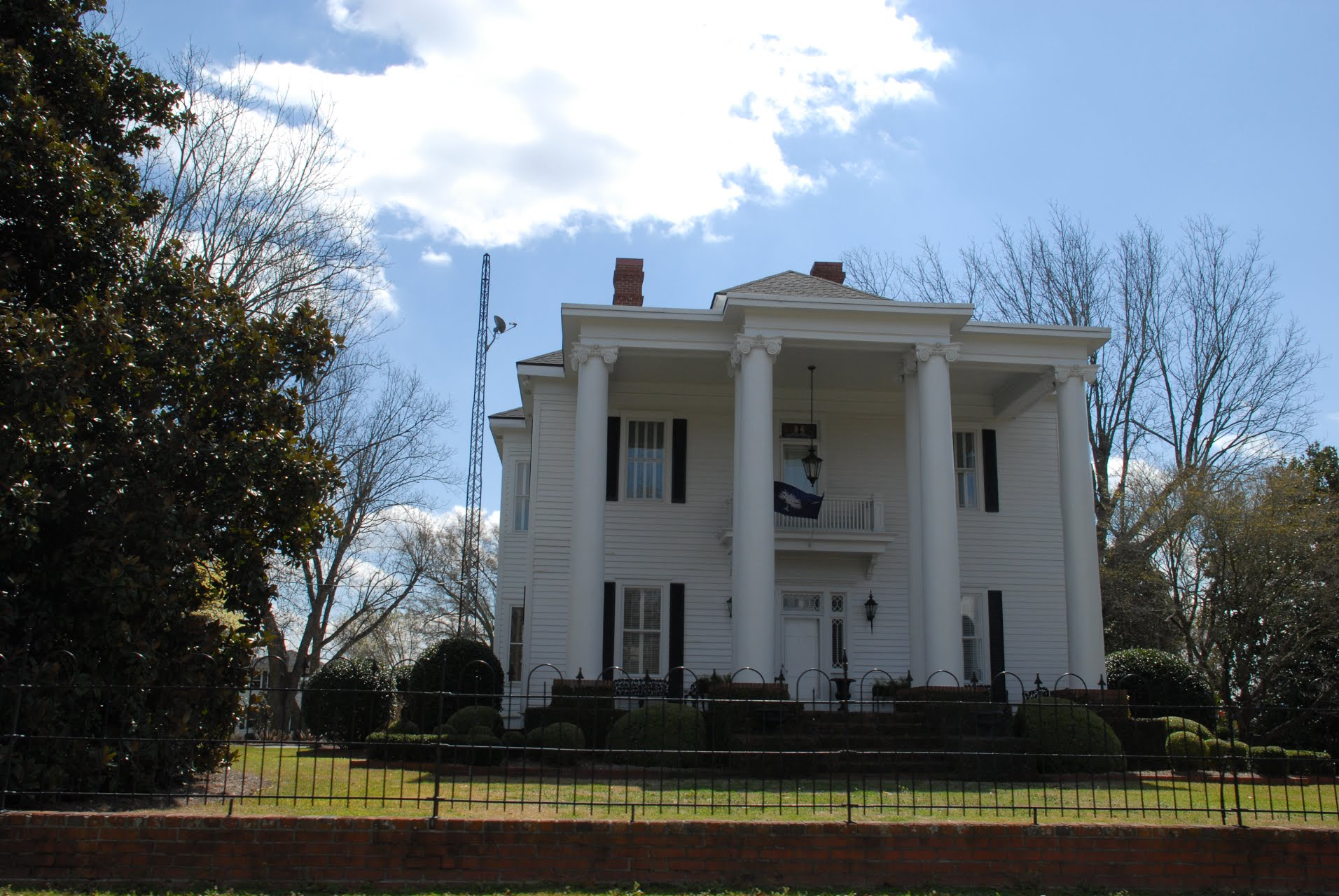

- Location within South Carolina Location within the United States
- Location: 3755 Boots Branch Rd., near Sumter, South Carolina
- Coordinates: 33°48′34″N 80°15′52″W
- Area: 1.5 acres (0.61 ha)
- Built: 1911
- Built by: Brogdon, J. Clinton
- Architectural style: Classical Revival
- NRHP reference No.: 93000585
- Added to NRHP: July 1, 1993

J. Clinton Brogdon House is a historic house located at 3755 Boots Branch Road near Sumter, Sumter County, South Carolina.

== Description and history ==
It was built in 1911, and is a two-story, three-bay, frame Neo-Classical style dwelling. It features a full façade front porch supported by six unfluted columns with Ionic order capitals. It may be a rare example of a mail order house in the area.

It was added to the National Register of Historic Places on July 1, 1993.
