= Myrtle Moor =

Historic house in South Carolina, United States

- U.S. National Register of Historic Places
- Nearest city: Sumter, South Carolina
- Area: 4.5 acres (1.8 ha)
- Architectural style: Greek Revival, Federal
- NRHP reference No.: 83002210
- Added to NRHP: January 13, 1983

Myrtle Moor is a historic plantation house located near Sumter, Sumter County, South Carolina. It was built about 1825–1840, and is a large, two-story, L-shaped frame farmhouse embellished with vernacular interpretations of the Federal and Greek Revival styles.. The front façade features a one-story full-shed-roof porch supported by six chamfered wooden posts. Also on the property are the contributing commissary, a barn, and a speculated servants' quarters/kitchen.

It was added to the National Register of Historic Places in 1983.
