= Sumter Town Hall-Opera House =

- U.S. National Register of Historic Places
- U.S. Historic district – Contributing property
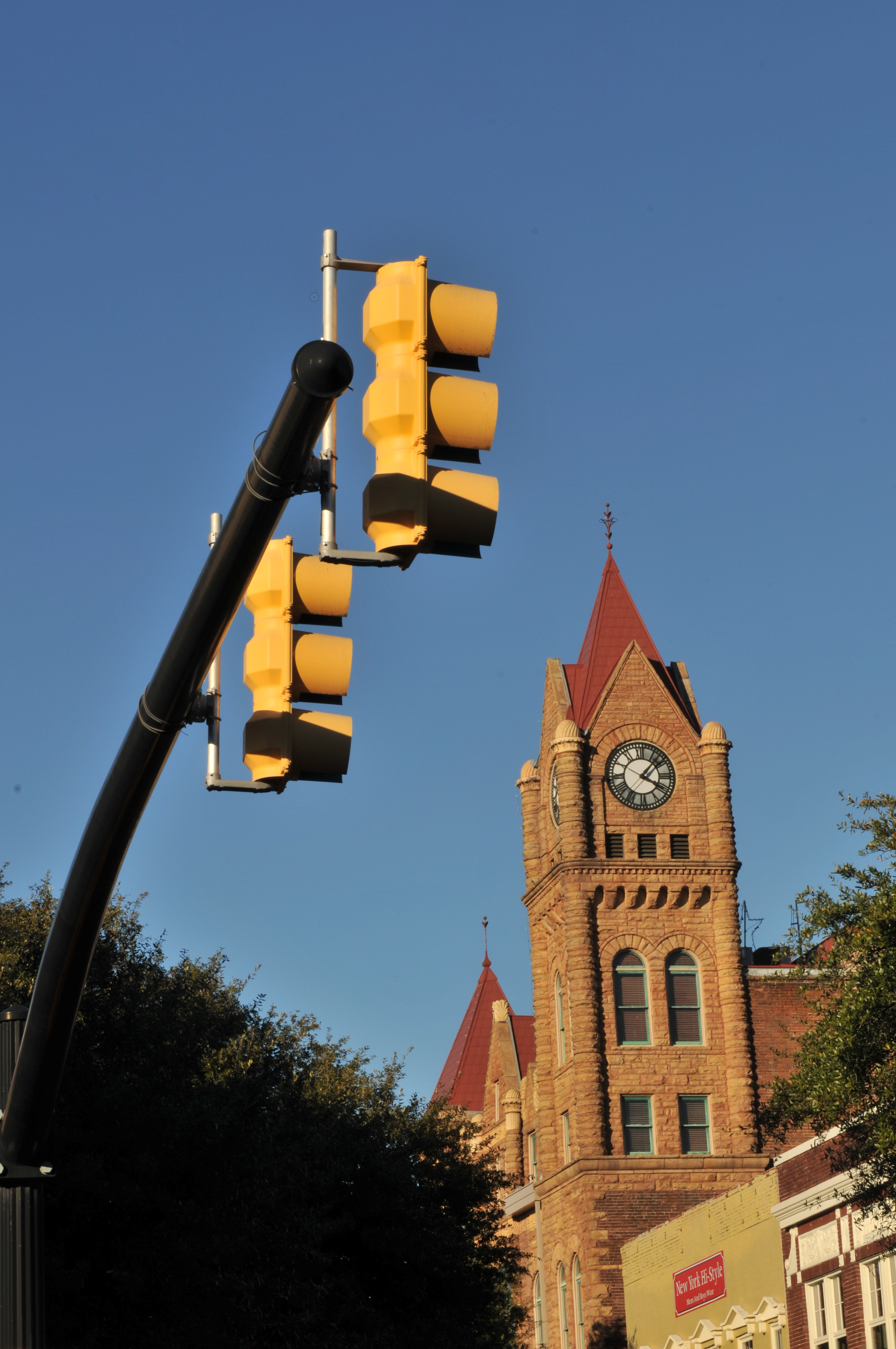
- Opera House clock tower, January 2013

- Location within South Carolina Location within the United States
- Location: N. Main St., Sumter, South Carolina
- Coordinates: 33°55′15″N 80°20′30″W
- Area: 1.3 acres (0.53 ha)
- Built: 1893
- Architectural style: Richardsonian Romanesque
- NRHP reference No.: 73001733
- Added to NRHP: May 24, 1973

Sumter Town Hall-Opera House, also known as the Sumter Academy of Music, is a historic town hall building located at Sumter, Sumter County, South Carolina. It was built in 1893, and is a four-story, ashlar brick Richardsonian Romanesque style building. It features a four-faced clock tower that serves as a focal point for the entire area. The building was remodeled internally in 1936, converting the first floor into a movie theater and the second floor opera house into offices.

It was added to the National Register of Historic Places in 1973. It is located in the Sumter Historic District.

The historic Opera House stands tall and proud in the heart of downtown Sumter, South Carolina and is known as one of Sumter’s Crown Jewels. Through the years this building has served a number of purposes and has seen a great deal of change. In 1987 with the reopening of this building, its past is remembered as its future is celebrated.

- 1872: On January 14, 1872, the cornerstone was laid on Main Street in Sumter for a town hall and marketplace. $2,307.45 had been raised when contractors R.J. Tuomey, mason, and Hiram Phillips, carpenter, were hired to construct the building. By June the exterior was completed and painted, but the interior was still incomplete. Unfortunately, all the money for this project had been spent, and it was necessary for the promoters to obtain credit to hire A.J. Moses to complete the job. Completed in December, it was a two-story wooden structure with two rooms on the ground floor a guardhouse and market in the rear, and an elegant theater upstairs. The theater had 500 seats that could be removed for dances and receptions.
- 1873: Originally the town hall was called the Opera House, but in 1873, it was renamed the Music Hall.
- 1886: Opera prima donnas Clara Louise Kellogg, born in Sumter in 1839, was the first nationally acclaimed performer to appear in an opera in the upstairs Music Hall, which was managed by D. J. Auld.
- 1888: Belva Ann Lockwood, who was known as the "Queen of the Bar" for being the first woman admitted to practice before the U.S. Supreme Court, gave a lecture for the citizens of Sumter. Ms. Lockwood was also the first woman candidate for presidency of the United States, nominated in 1884 and 1888 by the National Equal Rights Party. An unusually small crowd expressed Sumter*s disapproval of the speaker.
- 1889: Sumter City Council signed a three- year lease on the hall with J.A. Schwerin & Company at a rental rate of $300.00 a year. The name of the hall was changed to the Academy of Music.
- 1890: Renovations included the addition of fifty electric lights, an inclined floor, and seven tiers of noiseless opera chairs with hat racks. The remodeled stage featured a box on each side and a drop curtain, painted by Eugene Cramer of Columbia, South Carolina, which showed a view of Lake Como nestled among the hills of Italy. The total number of seats was increased to 700.
- 1892: On December 9, 1892, while Chick Company from New York City was giving a performance, fire broke out in a dressing room of the Music Hall. The audience exited safely, but most of the actors lost valuables as they escaped with only the costumes they were wearing. The entire Music Hall including the second-floor office where the town*s records were kept, was destroyed as well as several surrounding stores. Total loss was set at $70,000.
- 1893: Within months of the devastating fire a second cornerstone was laid for a new City Hall-Opera House. A new building made of Cumberland buff stone was constructed in the Richardsonian Romanesque style and featured a 100-foot tall, four-faced tower with a clock operated by weights. Name the Opera House, it was designed by architect J.C. Turner of Augusta, Georgia, and built by J.W. McKiever of Charleston, South Carolina, at a total cost of $35,000. The Town Council met at the Masonic Temple on Liberty Street and marched with the Masons to the dedication ceremony on Main Street where General Kennedy of Camden, South Carolina, gave the address. Music for the occasion was provided by the 2nd Regiment Band.
- 1936: The cornerstone was reset in May, and a $120,000 renovation transformed the Opera House into a moving-picture theater. This project also provided jobs for 300 workers in the midst of the Great Depression. The premier picture shown at this Sumter Theater was Earthworm Tractor starring comedian Joe E. Brown. The admission price was .35 cents for adults and .10 cents for children.
- 1973: Through efforts spearheaded by Councilwoman Colleen Yates, the Opera House was officially listed on the National Register of Historical Places.
- 1982: The Sumter Theater closed its doors after 46 years of operation, thus sealing the doors of the Opera House. The future of this historical building was uncertain.
- 1984: The City of Sumter, needing more office space than was available in the City-County Complex, and sensitive to the needs of downtown, decided to relocate on Main Street in the Opera House. General Obligation Bonds in the amount of $1,800,000 were approved and sold to the First National Bank of South Carolina. The architecture firm Drakeford-Jackson & Associates was authorized to begin renovation plans.
- 1985: Mayor W.A. McElveen, Jr., city councilmen, and officials opened the Opera House cornerstone on September 18 as the renovation and expansion project was begun. The copper cornerstone box revealed coins from the 1700s, documents from the 1800s, and letters and newspapers from 1936. Unfortunately, the contents of the 1893 cornerstone were found to have been ruined by moisture.
- 1987: The renovation of the Opera House was completed. The 75th anniversary of the Council-Manager form of government which originated in Sumter in 1912 is celebrated.

Today, City administration occupies the upper levels of the Opera House as the center of city government for Sumter. On the first floor the auditorium continues to be in demand and used for concerts (by such groups as the Sumter Community band and celebrities such as Nancy Griffith), school events, and other local happenings. The Opera House stands today not only as a symbol of the past but also as an active sign of the ongoing progressive spirit of the people of Sumter.

The Sumter Opera House has hosted Starship in 2018, Tiffany in 2019, and The 5th Dimension in 2022.
