= O'Donnell House (Sumter, South Carolina) =

- U.S. National Register of Historic Places
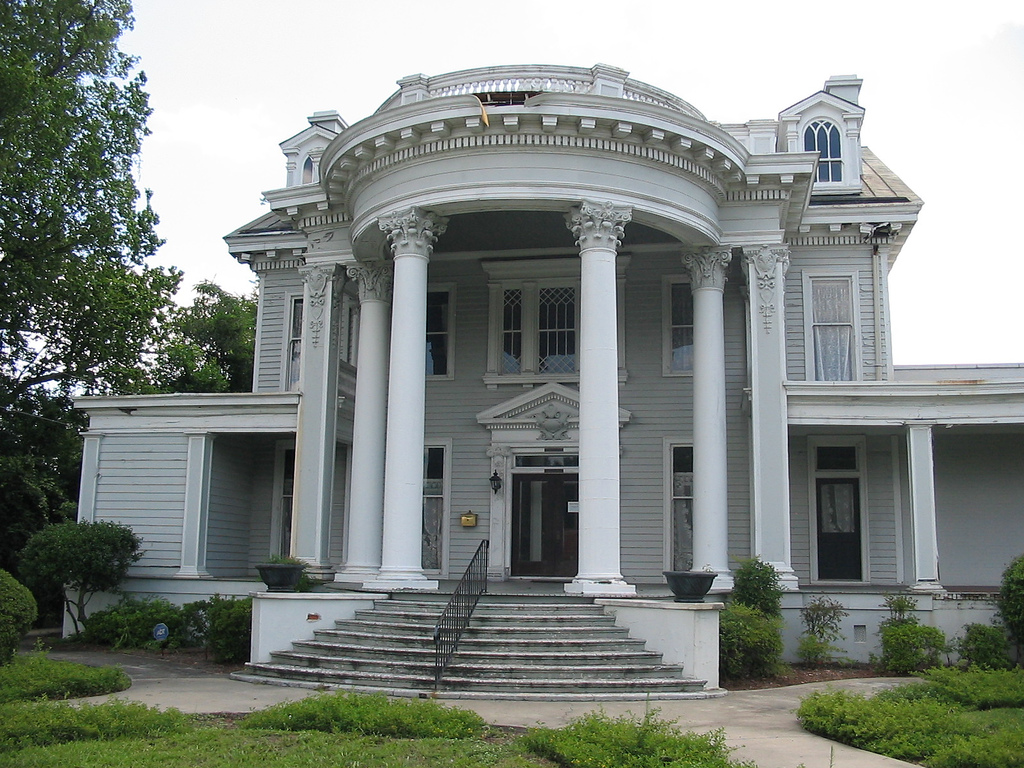

- Location within South Carolina Location within the United States
- Location: 120 E. Liberty St., Sumter, South Carolina
- Coordinates: 33°55′10″N 80°20′21″W
- Area: 2.4 acres (0.97 ha)
- Built: 1840
- Architect: Frank Pierce Milburn
- Architectural style: Classical Revival
- NRHP reference No.: 96000407
- Added to NRHP: April 25, 1996

The O’Donnell House, also known as Haynsworth-Bogin-O'Donnell House or Shelley-Brunson Funeral Home, was built in Sumter, South Carolina in 1840. The house was originally located on South Main Street. It was moved three blocks to East Liberty Street in 1891. In 1905, Frank Pierce Milburn, a prominent architect in the southeast in the late-19th to early-20th centuries, renovated the house. The house is named after the O’Donnell family, of which Neill O'Donnell served as president of First National Bank in Sumter from 1910-1930. The house was listed on the National Register of Historic Places in 1996. It is currently used as an event venue.

== History ==
In 1832, William M. DeLorme, a local merchant, purchased a 90-acre tract of land in Sumter, South Carolina for $5 ($186 in 2025). In 1840, what is now known as the O’Donnell House, was built on the purchased land, on South Main Street in Sumter. Delorme’s sister, Mary M. H. Haynsworth lived in the house until her death in 1858.

On March 9, 1860, Mary M.H. Haynsworth’s executors sold the house to William Bogin, a local shop owner, for $2,500 ($96,000 in 2025). William Bogin’s daughter, Kate, married Neill O’Donnell, a local businessman who eventually served as president of First National Bank in Sumter. The couple moved into the house after William Bogin's death in 1887. Neill O'Donnell was originally from Ireland, and he and his wife, Kate, were both Catholics.

In 1891, the O’Donnell House was disassembled from its original location on South Main Street, and reassembled three blocks away on East Liberty Street. The moving process took “a few weeks”. The house was rebuilt near St Anne’s Catholic Church, in an area called “Little Dublin”, due to its high population of Irish Catholics.

Tight-knit Irish communities were common in the Southern United States during the mid-19th century and beyond. Irish immigrants in the United States shared feelings of exile due to the Great Famine and British oppression. They also felt alienated by the South’s strong Protestant culture. These shared feelings caused many Irish communities and neighborhoods to form in the Southern United States.

In 1905, the O’Donnells hired American architect Frank Pierce Milburn to renovate their house for $10,000 ($363,000 in 2025). Milburn’s designs include South Carolina’s State House in Columbia, South Carolina, the old Florida State Capitol, as well as many railroad stations and other buildings for the Southern Railway Company.

In 1937, after the passing of both Kate and Neill O'Donnell, the couple's executors gave the house to The Sisters of Charity of Our Lady of Mercy, a sisterhood associated with St. Anne’s Catholic Church. The nuns lived in the upper floors, and operated a kindergarten on the bottom floor.

In 1961, A. Kell Brunson purchased the property for use as a funeral home, until it was listed for sale in 1988.

In 1993, the property was to be sold to Bi-Lo, an American supermarket chain, who intended to demolish the house to build a store and parking lot. However, a local group of citizens, nicknamed "C.O.P.S." (Crazy Old People of Sumter) by the would-be developer, attempted to find an alternative to demolishing the house. The "C.O.P.S." were able to purchase the property through a cooperative loan from private citizens. The house then became the offices for Santee Senior Services, a private non-profit group, which assisted the elderly population in Sumter.

In 1996, the house was listed on the National Register of Historic Places.

In 2004, Santee Senior Services relocated their offices from the house. In 2005, the house served as the temporary location for the Sumter County Library while the main location was renovated.

In 2009, Wayne and Wanda Hunter purchased the house to convert it into an event venue.

== Architecture ==
When the house was first built in 1840, it was a two-story Italianate style house, containing two brick chimneys and built on a brick foundation. The roof was flat, and the house had a two-story wrought iron front porch.

After its 1905 renovation by Frank Pierce Milburn, the O’Donnell House had the appearance of a Neo-Classical Revival style building. A gable-end roof was added, which created a third story. The portico in the front was supported by four new Corinthian columns, as well as square columns closer to the house. The front door was replaced with a full-length glass set of double doors, leading to a new foyer inside.

When the house became a funeral home in 1961, a one-story brick chapel was added to the western side. Another addition was added to the rear wing of the house.

== Current Use ==
Since 2009, the house has served as a venue for corporate and social events, including weddings and receptions. To accommodate these events, the west wing chapel was transformed into a ballroom. The current owners plan to restore the 2nd and 3rd floors of the house to be used as a bed and breakfast.
