= Sumter, South Carolina =

City in Sumter County, South Carolina, United States

Sumter
- City
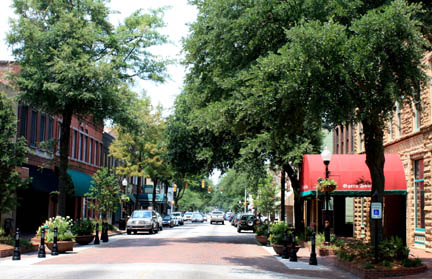
- Downtown Sumter

- Seal Logo
- Nickname(s): The Gamecock City, King City of the East Midlands
- Mottoes: "Uncommon Patriotism, Progressive Spirit" "Invest. Invite. Serve."
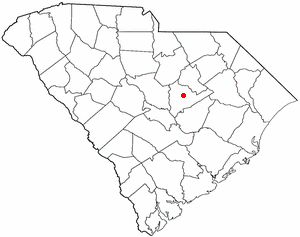
- Location in South Carolina
- Coordinates: 33°55′14″N 80°22′30″W
- Country: United States
- state: South Carolina
- county: Sumter
- Incorporated: 1845
- Named for: Thomas Sumter

Area
  - City: 33.06 sq mi (85.62 km^{2})
  - Land: 32.86 sq mi (85.11 km^{2})
  - Water: 0.20 sq mi (0.51 km^{2}) 0.60%
- Elevation: 154 ft (47 m)

Population (2020)
  - City: 43,463
  - Rank: SC: 8th
  - Density: 1,322.6/sq mi (510.66/km^{2})
  - Urban: 68,825 (US: 406th)
  - Urban density: 1,194/sq mi (460.9/km^{2})
- Time zone: UTC−5 (EST)
  - Summer (DST): UTC-4 (EDT)
- ZIP code: 29150, 29151, 29153, 29154
- Area codes: 803, 839
- FIPS code: 45-70405
- GNIS feature ID: 2405546
- Website: www.sumtersc.gov

Sumter (/ˈsʌmtər/ SUM-tər) is a city in and the county seat of Sumter County, South Carolina, United States. The city makes up the Sumter, SC Metropolitan Statistical Area. Sumter County, along with Clarendon and Lee counties, form the core of Sumter–Lee–Clarendon tri-county (or East Midlands) area of South Carolina that includes three counties straddling the border of the Sandhills (or Midlands), Pee Dee, and Lowcountry regions. The population was 43,463 at the 2020 census, making it the 9th-most populous city in the state.

== History ==
Incorporated as Sumterville in 1845, the city's name was shortened to Sumter in 1855. It has grown and prospered from its early beginnings as a plantation settlement. The city and county of Sumter bear the name of General Thomas Sumter, the "Fighting Gamecock" of the American Revolutionary War.

During the Civil War, the town was an important supply and railroad repair center for the Confederacy. After the war, Sumter grew and prospered, using its large railroad network to supply cotton, timber, and by the start of the 20th century, tobacco to the region.

During the 20th century, Sumter grew into a major industrial center. Still a unique business founded in 1923, Palmetto Pigeon Plant has grown into one of the largest producers of squab, poussin (chicken), cornish game hen, and silkie chickens in the world. Starting with the opening of Shaw Air Force Base (now home to the 9th Air Force, 20th Fighter Wing, and United States Army Central) in 1941, industry grew, especially after World War II. Sumter became increasingly known for textiles, manufacturing, biotech industries, special chemistry (Branch of Swiss-based Ems-Chemie), thriving retail environment, and medical center of its region in addition to agricultural products, which makes it a hub for business in the east-central portion of South Carolina.

Local and nearby sites listed on the National Register of Historic Places include:

- Carnegie Public Library
- Charles T. Mason House
- Elizabeth White House
- Goodwill Parochial School
- Henry Lee Scarborough House
- Heriot-Moise House
- J. Clinton Brogdon House
- Lincoln High School
- Myrtle Moor
- O'Donnell House
- Rip Raps Plantation
- Salem Black River Presbyterian Church
- Singleton's Graveyard
- Stateburg Historic District
- Sumter County Courthouse
- Sumter Historic District
- Sumter Town Hall-Opera House
- Temple Sinai

On September 17, 2024, the National Park Service announced that the City of Sumter and Sumter County were jointly named a World War II Heritage City.

== Geography ==
Interactive map of Sumter

Known as the Gamecock City, Sumter lies near the geographic center of the state of South Carolina at 33°55′37″N 80°21′49″W (33.926942, -80.363541). Sumter is 100 miles west of Myrtle Beach's Grand Strand and 175 miles east of the Blue Ridge Mountains. Columbia, the state capital, is about 45 miles to the west, and Charleston is around 100 miles to the south. According to the United States Census Bureau, the city has a total area of 33.06 square miles (85.6 km^{2}), of which 32.86 square miles (85.1 km^{2}) is land and 0.20 square miles (0.52 km^{2}) (0.60%) is water.

=== Climate ===
Sumter has a humid subtropical climate (Köppen: Cfa) with long, hot summers and short, mild winters.

Climate data for Sumter, South Carolina (1991–2020 normals, extremes 1901–1906, 1929–present)
| Month | Jan | Feb | Mar | Apr | May | Jun | Jul | Aug | Sep | Oct | Nov | Dec | Year |
|---|---|---|---|---|---|---|---|---|---|---|---|---|---|
| Record high °F (°C) | 83 (28) | 86 (30) | 97 (36) | 94 (34) | 104 (40) | 103 (39) | 105 (41) | 105 (41) | 102 (39) | 100 (38) | 90 (32) | 84 (29) | 105 (41) |
| Mean maximum °F (°C) | 73.6 (23.1) | 76.5 (24.7) | 82.9 (28.3) | 87.0 (30.6) | 92.0 (33.3) | 96.0 (35.6) | 97.6 (36.4) | 96.7 (35.9) | 93.1 (33.9) | 86.2 (30.1) | 79.6 (26.4) | 74.8 (23.8) | 99.0 (37.2) |
| Mean daily maximum °F (°C) | 55.1 (12.8) | 58.5 (14.7) | 66.3 (19.1) | 74.7 (23.7) | 81.2 (27.3) | 87.3 (30.7) | 90.2 (32.3) | 88.5 (31.4) | 83.4 (28.6) | 74.4 (23.6) | 64.8 (18.2) | 57.4 (14.1) | 73.5 (23.0) |
| Daily mean °F (°C) | 43.9 (6.6) | 46.7 (8.2) | 53.6 (12.0) | 62.2 (16.8) | 69.5 (20.8) | 76.6 (24.8) | 79.9 (26.6) | 78.5 (25.8) | 73.2 (22.9) | 62.6 (17.0) | 52.4 (11.3) | 46.2 (7.9) | 62.1 (16.7) |
| Mean daily minimum °F (°C) | 32.8 (0.4) | 35.0 (1.7) | 40.9 (4.9) | 49.6 (9.8) | 57.8 (14.3) | 65.9 (18.8) | 69.6 (20.9) | 68.4 (20.2) | 62.9 (17.2) | 50.9 (10.5) | 40.0 (4.4) | 35.0 (1.7) | 50.7 (10.4) |
| Mean minimum °F (°C) | 17.8 (−7.9) | 21.9 (−5.6) | 25.7 (−3.5) | 34.4 (1.3) | 44.8 (7.1) | 57.3 (14.1) | 63.4 (17.4) | 61.0 (16.1) | 52.3 (11.3) | 36.2 (2.3) | 26.3 (−3.2) | 22.2 (−5.4) | 15.9 (−8.9) |
| Record low °F (°C) | 2 (−17) | 4 (−16) | 11 (−12) | 25 (−4) | 36 (2) | 43 (6) | 52 (11) | 50 (10) | 38 (3) | 24 (−4) | 16 (−9) | 8 (−13) | 2 (−17) |
| Average precipitation inches (mm) | 3.78 (96) | 3.47 (88) | 3.67 (93) | 3.40 (86) | 3.78 (96) | 5.05 (128) | 5.75 (146) | 4.92 (125) | 4.36 (111) | 3.88 (99) | 2.94 (75) | 3.83 (97) | 48.83 (1,240) |
| Average snowfall inches (cm) | 0.3 (0.76) | 0.0 (0.0) | 0.0 (0.0) | 0.0 (0.0) | 0.0 (0.0) | 0.0 (0.0) | 0.0 (0.0) | 0.0 (0.0) | 0.0 (0.0) | 0.0 (0.0) | 0.0 (0.0) | 0.0 (0.0) | 0.3 (0.76) |
| Average precipitation days (≥ 0.01 in) | 10.8 | 9.9 | 9.2 | 8.3 | 9.3 | 11.7 | 11.1 | 11.4 | 8.7 | 7.5 | 8.2 | 10.6 | 116.7 |
| Average snowy days (≥ 0.1 in) | 0.2 | 0.0 | 0.0 | 0.0 | 0.0 | 0.0 | 0.0 | 0.0 | 0.0 | 0.0 | 0.0 | 0.0 | 0.2 |
Source: NOAA

== Demographics ==
Historical population
| Census | Pop. | Note | %± |
|---|---|---|---|
| 1850 | 1,356 | | — |
| 1860 | 1,119 | | −17.5% |
| 1870 | 1,807 | | 61.5% |
| 1880 | 2,011 | | 11.3% |
| 1890 | 3,865 | | 92.2% |
| 1900 | 5,673 | | 46.8% |
| 1910 | 8,109 | | 42.9% |
| 1920 | 9,508 | | 17.3% |
| 1930 | 11,780 | | 23.9% |
| 1940 | 15,874 | | 34.8% |
| 1950 | 20,185 | | 27.2% |
| 1960 | 23,062 | | 14.3% |
| 1970 | 24,435 | | 6.0% |
| 1980 | 24,921 | | 2.0% |
| 1990 | 41,943 | | 68.3% |
| 2000 | 39,643 | | −5.5% |
| 2010 | 40,524 | | 2.2% |
| 2020 | 43,463 | | 7.3% |
| 2025 (est.) | 43,094 | | −0.8% |
U.S. Decennial Census; 2020

=== Racial and ethnic composition ===
Sumter, South Carolina – Racial and ethnic composition Note: the U.S. census treats Hispanic/Latino as an ethnic category. This table excludes Latinos from the racial categories and assigns them to a separate category. Hispanics/Latinos may be of any race.
| Race / Ethnicity (NH = Non-Hispanic) | Pop 2000 | Pop 2010 | Pop 2020 | % 2000 | % 2010 | % 2020 |
|---|---|---|---|---|---|---|
| White alone (NH) | 19,300 | 17,777 | 17,428 | 48.68% | 43.87% | 40.10% |
| Black or African American alone (NH) | 18,256 | 19,755 | 21,001 | 46.05% | 48.75% | 48.32% |
| Native American or Alaska Native alone (NH) | 78 | 101 | 97 | 0.20% | 0.25% | 0.22% |
| Asian alone (NH) | 503 | 647 | 891 | 1.27% | 1.60% | 2.05% |
| Pacific Islander alone (NH) | 28 | 48 | 40 | 0.07% | 0.12% | 0.09% |
| Other race alone (NH) | 79 | 47 | 132 | 0.20% | 0.12% | 0.30% |
| Mixed race or Multiracial (NH) | 461 | 682 | 1,767 | 1.16% | 1.68% | 4.07% |
| Hispanic or Latino (any race) | 938 | 1,467 | 2,107 | 2.37% | 3.62% | 4.85% |
| Total | 39,643 | 40,524 | 43,463 | 100.00% | 100.00% | 100.00% |

=== 2020 census ===
As of the 2020 census, Sumter had a population of 43,463 and 9,925 families. The median age was 35.3 years; 24.2% of residents were under the age of 18 and 16.7% of residents were 65 years of age or older. For every 100 females there were 88.4 males, and for every 100 females age 18 and over there were 84.4 males.

98.8% of residents lived in urban areas, while 1.2% lived in rural areas.

There were 17,437 households in Sumter, of which 32.3% had children under the age of 18 living in them. Of all households, 37.2% were married-couple households, 19.8% were households with a male householder and no spouse or partner present, and 38.0% were households with a female householder and no spouse or partner present. About 32.7% of all households were made up of individuals and 13.6% had someone living alone who was 65 years of age or older.

There were 19,475 housing units, of which 10.5% were vacant. The homeowner vacancy rate was 1.9% and the rental vacancy rate was 7.7%.

Racial composition as of the 2020 census
| Race | Number | Percent |
|---|---|---|
| White | 17,939 | 41.3% |
| Black or African American | 21,168 | 48.7% |
| American Indian and Alaska Native | 128 | 0.3% |
| Asian | 908 | 2.1% |
| Native Hawaiian and Other Pacific Islander | 41 | 0.1% |
| Some other race | 852 | 2.0% |
| Two or more races | 2,427 | 5.6% |
| Hispanic or Latino (of any race) | 2,107 | 4.8% |

=== 2010 census ===
At the 2010 census, 40,541 people, 16,232 households, and 10,049 families resided in the city. The population density was 575.6 people/km^{2} (1,491 people/mi^{2}). The 16,032 housing units averaged 232.8 units/km^{2} (603 units/mi^{2}). The racial makeup of the city was 47.07% Caucasian, 47.03% Black, 0.23% Native American, 1.27% Asian, 0.07% Pacific Islander, 1.12% from other races, and 1.41% from two or more races. Hispanics or Latinos of any race were 2.37% of the population.

Of the 14,564 households, 35.6% had children under the age of 18 living with them, 46.0% were married couples living together, 19.3% had a female householder with no husband present, and 31.0% were not families. About 27.3% of all households were made up of individuals, and 11.7% had someone living alone who was 65 years of age or older. The average household size was 2.57 and the average family size was 3.14.

In the city, the population was distributed as 27.8% under the age of 18, 12.5% from 18 to 24, 28.2% from 25 to 44, 17.9% from 45 to 64, and 13.5% who were 65 years of age or older. The median age was 32 years. For every 100 females, there were 89.2 males. For every 100 females age 18 and over, there were 83.9 males.

The median income for a household in the city was $31,590, and for a family was $38,668. Males had a median income of $27,078 versus $22,002 for females. The per capita income for the city was $16,949. About 13.0% of families and 16.6% of the population were below the poverty line, including 21.8% of those under age 18 and 15.3% of those age 65 or over.

== Government and law ==
Sumter
- Crime rates* (2022)

Violent crimes
- Homicide: 14.0
- Rape: 23.4
- Robbery: 56.1
- Aggravated assault: 790.5
- Total violent crime: 884.1

Property crimes
- Burglary: 432.7
- Larceny-theft: 2,561.0
- Motor vehicle theft: 261.9
- Arson: 11.7
- Total property crime: 3,267.3
- Note: Reported crimes per 100,000 population Source: 2022 FBI UCR Data

Sumter adopted the council–manager form of government on June 11, 1912. The city council appoints a city manager to serve as chief administrative officer to run the day-to-day business of the city. This individual serves at the pleasure of the council. A mayor is elected to serve as the chairman of the city council; both the mayor and the councilmen serve four-year terms.

Six councilmen, who are not subject to term limits, are elected by ward, whereas the mayor is elected at-large. Sumter City Council is responsible for making policies and enacting laws, rules, and regulations to provide for future community and economic growth. The council is also responsible for providing the necessary support for the orderly and efficient operation of city services.

Martha Priscilla Shaw, who was Sumter's first female mayor from 1952 to 1956, was also the first woman to serve as a mayor in South Carolina.

== Education ==
There is one school district—Sumter School District—which serves both the City of Sumter and the rest of Sumter County.

Sumter is home to Crestwood High School, Lakewood High School, and Sumter High School. Each public school is accredited by the Southern Association of Colleges and Schools and the State Department of Education. The area also includes the private institutions of Thomas Sumter Academy, Wilson Hall, Sumter Christian School, St. Anne Catholic School, St. Francis Xavier High School, Berea Junior Academy, and Westside Christian Academy.

=== Higher education ===
Sumter is home to several collegiate institutions. The area is served by Morris College (a historically black (HBCU) private, four-year liberal arts college); Central Carolina Technical College (a public two-year technical college); and the University of South Carolina Sumter.

=== Library ===
Sumter has a public library system that includes three branches of the Sumter County Library network.

== Shaw Air Force Base ==
Sumter is home to Shaw Air Force Base, headquarters of the United States Air Forces Central Command, United States Army Central, 15th Air Force, the 20th Fighter Wing, and many other tenant units. Since World War II, it has been a major source of federal and civilian employment in the area.

Shaw's fighter planes consist of the F-16 Fighting Falcon, which is a versatile multirole fighter. F-16s dispatched from Shaw were the primary fighters used in the Gulf War. In response to the city's service, presidents from Dwight D. Eisenhower through Barack Obama have visited the city and base. The base was named in honor of 1st Lt. Ervin David Shaw, one of the early Americans to fly combat missions in World War I.

== Mass transit ==
The Santee-Wateree Regional Transit Authority (SWRTA) is responsible for operating mass transit in greater Sumter area. The transit department is in connection with Shaw Air Force Base. SWRTA operates express shuttles and a bus service serving Sumter and the communities within the county. The authority was established in October 2002 after SCANA released ownership of public transportation back to the City of Sumter. Since 2003, SWRTA provides transportation for more than 10,000 passengers, has expanded route services, and introduced 15 new ADA accessible buses offering a safer, more comfortable means of transportation. In recent years, SWRTA added natural gas-powered buses to its small fleet, and has plans to expand.

== Roads and highways ==
=== Interstates ===
- I-95

=== US routes ===
- US 15
- US 76
- US 76 Bus.
- US 378
- US 401
- US 521
- US 521 Conn.

=== South Carolina state highways ===
- SC 120
- SC 261
- SC 441
- SC 763

== Swan Lake Iris Gardens ==
Swan Lake Iris Gardens is the only public park in the United States containing all eight known species of swan. The lake is dotted with islands and wildlife. The park is also home to some of the nation's most intensive plantings of Japanese Iris, which bloom yearly in mid to late May and last until the beginning of June. The garden is also planted with camellias, azaleas, day lilies, and Japanese magnolias. A Braille Trail enables the sight-impaired to enjoy the scents and sensations of the gardens.

This area was first developed in 1927 as a private fishing retreat by Hamilton Carr Bland, a local businessman. At the same time he was developing the 30 acres (12 ha) of swamp on what is now the north side of West Liberty Street, he was landscaping the grounds of his home with Japanese iris. They failed miserably, and after consulting expert horticulturists from as far away as New York, he ordered his gardener to dig up the bulbs and dump them at the swamp. The following spring, they burst into bloom.

The park is host to events and festivals throughout the year, including the annual "Iris Festival" which is held every Memorial Day weekend in May. The gardens also host a Christmas event with the nighttime Fantasy of Lights display, featuring more than 1,000,000 varicolored lights. It also hosts an annual Earth Day celebration.

== Sports ==
Riley Park is a 2,000-seat stadium primarily used for baseball, and was the home of the Sumter Braves, a Single A Atlanta Braves affiliate that competed in the South Atlantic League. Riley Park was home to the Braves from 1985 until 1990, when the team left Sumter for Macon, Georgia. Notable Sumter Braves who went on to Major League success include Tom Glavine, David Justice, Kevin Brown (right-handed pitcher), Mark Wohlers, Ryan Klesko, and Vinny Castilla. The Braves were replaced by the Sumter Flyers in 1991, a Single A Montreal Expos affiliate. The Flyers, however, left Sumter after one season. No professional baseball team has competed in Sumter since the end of the 1991 season.

Riley continues to be the home of the P-15s, an American Legion baseball team with a long history of success. The P-15s have won 15 state titles including in 1940, 1950, 1952, 1962, 1977, 1991, 1992, 1993, 1994, 1999, 2005, 2006, 2008, 2009, and 2011. They advanced to the 2006 American Legion World Series in Cedar Rapids, Iowa where they finished fourth nationally. The P-15s made a return trip to the American Legion World Series hosted by Shelby, NC in 2008 and 2009.

Palmetto Tennis Center is a new state-of-the-art tennis court in Palmetto Park. The tennis center has 24 official size tennis courts. It hosts numerous youth, collegiate, and professional tournaments each year. Sumter Memorial Stadium is home to Sumter High School's Gamecocks, Marvin Montgomery Field at Donald L. Crolley Memorial Stadium is home to the Crestwood High School Knights, and Dr. J. Frank Baker Stadium is home to the Lakewood High School Gators.

In the 1950s, Sumter was very strong in table tennis state champions, and in 1951, produced an All-American Table Tennis Tournament national men's champion Oliver Hoyt Stubbs.

New York Yankees former second baseman Bobby Richardson is from Sumter. The town built and named a youth baseball park in his honor. Sumter is also the home of pro basketball star Ray Allen, who had an 18-year career in the NBA.

Jordan Blackmon Montgomery (born December 27, 1992), nicknamed "Gumby", is an American professional baseball pitcher for the New York Yankees of Major League Baseball (MLB). He made his MLB debut in 2017. Before his professional career, Montgomery played college baseball for the South Carolina Gamecocks of the University of South Carolina.

== Notable people ==
Artists

- Jasper Johns, painter, sculptor, and printmaker.
- Grainger McKoy, artist in wood and metal sculpture.

Athletics/Competition

- Ray Allen, professional basketball player, 10-time NBA All-Star.
- Art Baker, collegiate football coach.
- Justin Bethel, NFL defensive back.
- Ronnie Burgess, NFL defensive back.
- Pete Chilcutt, played basketball for University of North Carolina and NBA from 1991 to 2000.
- Buck Flowers (Allen Ralph Flowers Jr., football player.
- Nicole Gamble, track and field triple jump champion.
- Terry Kinard, NFL player, first-round draft pick of New York Giants, played in 1986 Super Bowl.
- Wayne Mass, Edmunds High School player, All American at Clemson & then played in the NFL.
- Bob Montgomery, former lightweight boxing champion.
- Jordan Montgomery, Major League Baseball pitcher for the St. Louis Cardinals.
- Ja Morant, professional basketball player, was the 2nd overall pick in the 2019 NBA draft by the Memphis Grizzlies.
- Cleveland Pinkney, professional football player, Tampa Bay Buccaneers, Carolina Panthers and Detroit Lions.
- Jason Ratcliff, NASCAR crew chief for Matt Kenseth at Joe Gibbs Racing.
- Bobby Richardson, second baseman, three-time World Series champion with New York Yankees, baseball coach at South Carolina.
- Wally Richardson, former starting quarterback for Penn State.
- JP Sears (baseball), Major League Baseball pitcher for the Oakland Athletics.
- Freddie Solomon, NFL wide receiver, Miami Dolphins and San Francisco 49ers.
- John Stefero, former catcher for the Baltimore Orioles.
- Derrick Witherspoon. NFL, running back & return specialist.

Aviation & Space

- David A. King, former director of NASA Marshall Space Flight Center, Huntsville, Alabama

Beauty Pageant Winners

- Shawn Weatherly, Miss South Carolina USA, Miss USA, and Miss Universe (1980).

Business

- Samuel R. Allen, chairman and CEO of John Deere.
- Thomas Wilson (Industrialist), born in Scotland & becoming a prominent businessman, he was the wealthiest man in S. C. when he died.
- O.L. Williams, president of Williams Furniture Company.

Criminal Accusations

- Mark Orrin Barton, perpetrator of the 1999 Atlanta day trading firm shootings; a Sumter High School class of 1973 graduate.
- Robert Henry Best, Nazi broadcaster convicted of treason in 1948 and sentenced to life imprisonment.
- William Pierce confessed (and was convicted) to the 1970 murder of the daughter ("Peg" Cuttino) of state senator, James Cuttino Jr.; but "Pee Wee" Gaskins (Donald Henry Gaskins) also claimed that he killed her.
- "Pee Wee" Gaskins' (Donald Henry Gaskins) court case was held at the Sumter County courthouse on June 2, 1977. He pleaded guilty to killing "Peg" Cuttino.
- George Stinney, youngest American at 14 to be executed. He was African-American, and wrongfully convicted of murdering two white girls.

Education/Scholarship

- Glen Browder, history professor, former Alabama Congressman, and co-author of the 2018 book, South Carolina's Turkish People.
- Emilie Virginia Haynsworth, mathematician, known for the Haynsworth inertia additivity formula.
- Gloria Conyers Hewitt, mathematician.
- William Ephraim Mikell (1868–1944), dean of the University of Pennsylvania Law School.

Heroism

- Clarke Bynum (and Gifford M. Shaw) saved 300+ lives thwarting a passenger attempt to crash British Airways Flight 2069 12/29/2000.
- Robert F. Morel, II, recipient of Carnegie Medal for heroism award in 1990 for rescuing a police officer.

Military

- Charles J. Girard, brigadier general, one of highest ranking American officers to die in battle during the Vietnam War.
- The Citadel Cadet George Edward "Tuck" Haynsworth, who fired the first shot of the American Civil War, was born and raised in Sumter and is buried there.
- Major General George L. Mabry Jr., Medal of Honor recipient, second-most decorated soldier of World War II.
- Emile P. Moses, major general in the Marine Corps.
- Lt. Ervin David Shaw, WWI pilot and namesake of Shaw Air Force Base.

Motion Picture, Acting & TV

- Ryan Buell, founder of Penn State Paranormal Research Society; has a reality series on A&E, Paranormal State.
- Virginia Capers, Tony Award-winning actress.
- O'Neal Compton, actor, writer, photographer, commercial filmmaker.
- Nancy O'Dell, television personality, anchor of Entertainment Tonight.
- Jay Ellis, actor, Top Gun: Maverick.
- Kenya Pleaser, drag queen, competed on season 18 of RuPaul's Drag Race

Music

- Lee Brice, country music singer-songwriter.
- Rob Crosby, country music artist, singer, and songwriter.
- Ray "Stingray" Davis, founding member of The Parliaments, Parliament and Funkadelic.
- Clara Louise Kellogg, opera singer.

Law and Politicians

- Charlotta Bass, first black female to run for VP with the Progressive Party in 1952 & born in Sumter.
- Frank Bradford, politician and lawyer
- Jim Clyburn, politician, U.S. Representative House Majority Whip for 110th Congress.
- Marcia G. Cooke, U.S. District Court judge
- James Felder, state legislator and civil rights activist
- Charles Alexander Harvin, state legislator.
- Bubba McElveen, Sumter mayor and the first civilian to be named honorary chief master sergeant of the U.S. Air Force.
- Joe McElveen, Sumter's longest-serving mayor (2000–2020).
- Thomas McElveen, South Carolina State Senator (2012–2024)
- Lou-Ann Preble, congresswoman from Tucson, Arizona (1993–2002).
- Ramon Schwartz Jr., member of South Carolina Legislature and some years as Speaker of the South Carolina House of Representatives.
- Martha Priscilla Shaw, mayor of Sumter (1952–1956), first female mayor in South Carolina.
- Angelica Singleton Van Buren, acting First Lady of the United States during the presidency of Martin Van Buren.

Religion

- Rosa Horn, Pentecostal preacher and church leader

== Sister cities ==
- Taichung City, Taiwan

== See also ==
- List of municipalities in South Carolina
