= Sumter County Courthouse (South Carolina) =

- U.S. National Register of Historic Places
- U.S. Historic district – Contributing property
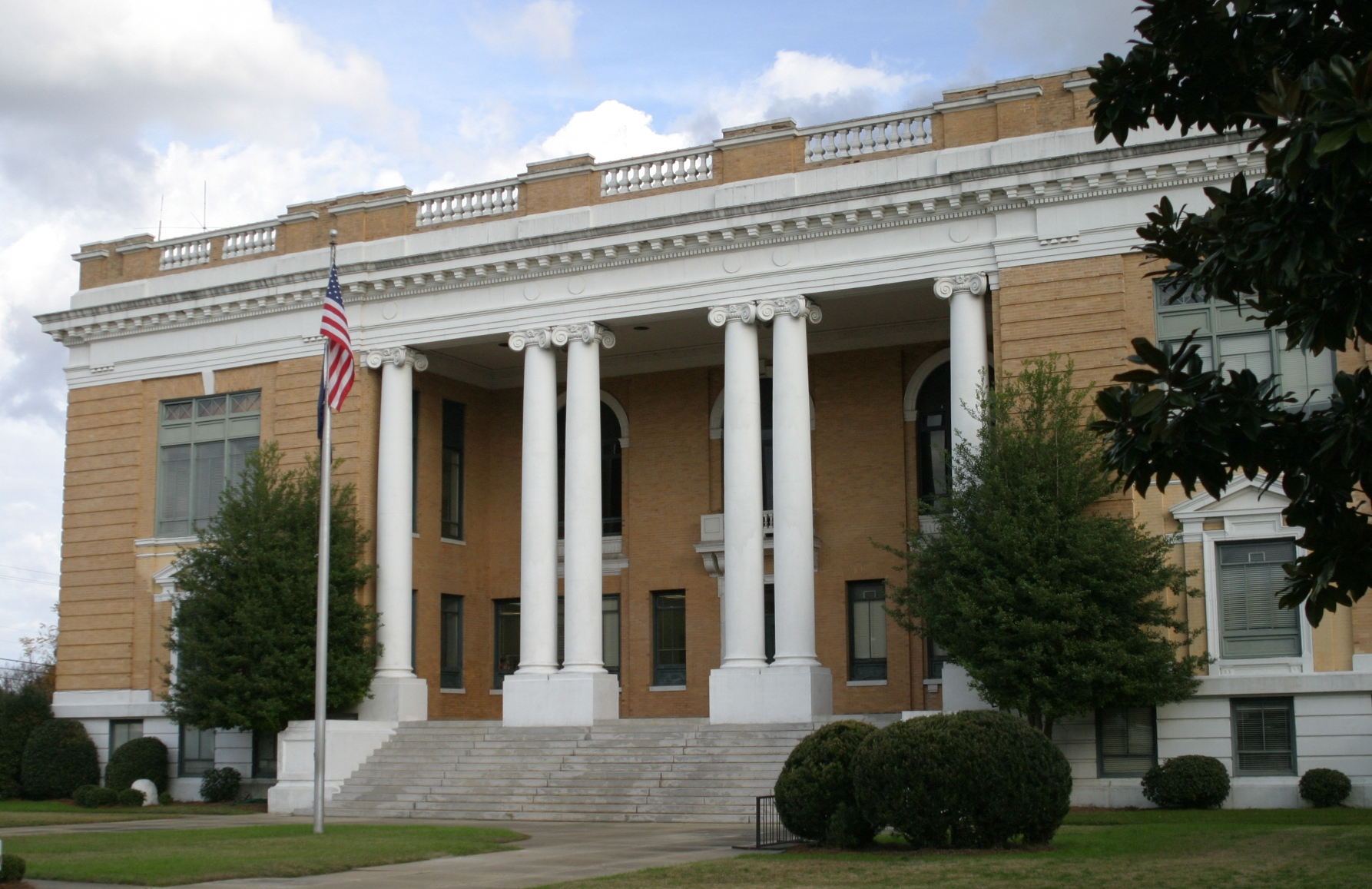
- Sumter County Courthouse

- Location within South Carolina Location within the United States
- Location: Sumter, South Carolina
- Coordinates: 33°55′28″N 80°20′29″W
- Area: 1.6 acres (0.65 ha)
- Built: 1907
- Architect: William Augustus Edwards; Frank C. Walter
- Architectural style: Beaux Arts
- MPS: Courthouses in South Carolina Designed by William Augustus Edwards TR
- NRHP reference No.: 04000619

The Sumter County Courthouse, built in 1907, is an historic courthouse located at 141 North Main Street in the city of Sumter in Sumter County, South Carolina. It was designed in the Beaux Arts style by Darlington native William Augustus Edwards who designed eight other South Carolina courthouses as well as academic buildings at 12 institutions in Florida, Georgia and South Carolina. It was built in an I-shape. In the early 1960s it was enlarged and remodeled. On June 16, 2004, it was added to the National Register of Historic Places. It is located in the Sumter Historic District.

== See also ==
- List of Registered Historic Places in South Carolina
- Sumter County Courthouse (disambiguation)

== Gallery ==
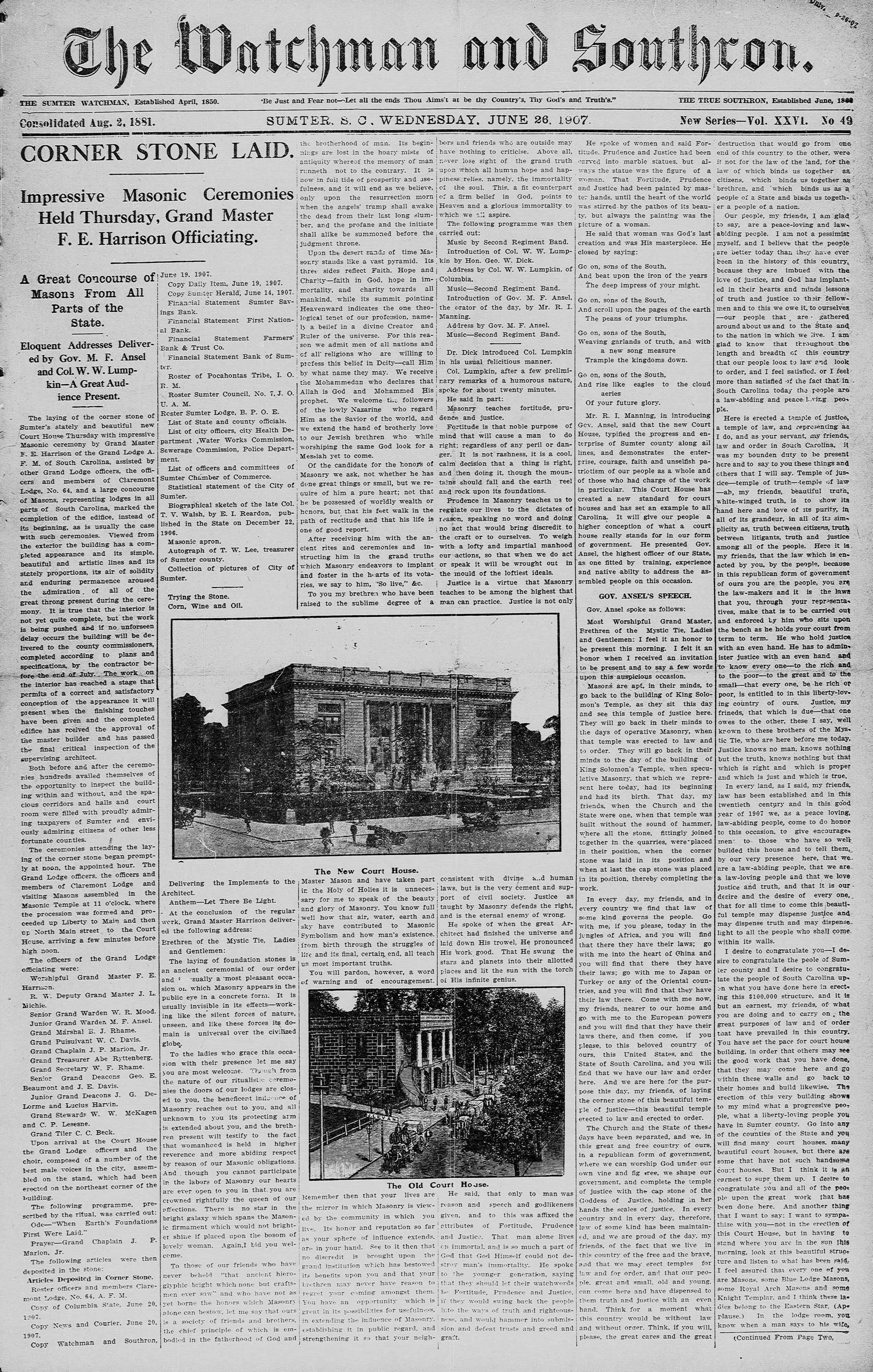
"Corner Stone Laid," Watchmen and Southron, June 26, 1907, p. 1

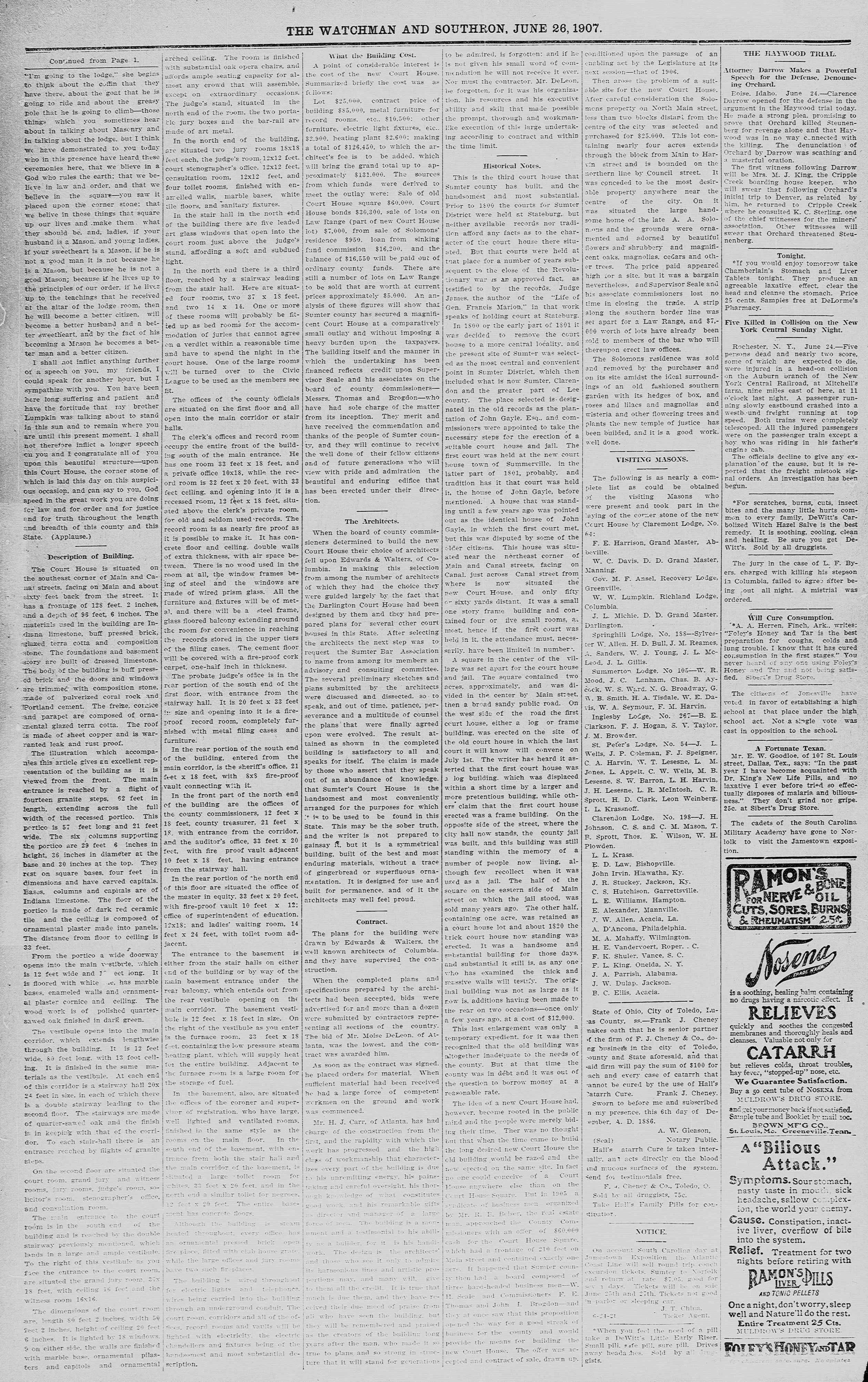
"Corner Stone Laid," Watchmen and Southron, June 26, 1907, p. 2
