= Henry Lee Scarborough House =

Historic house in South Carolina, United States

- U.S. National Register of Historic Places
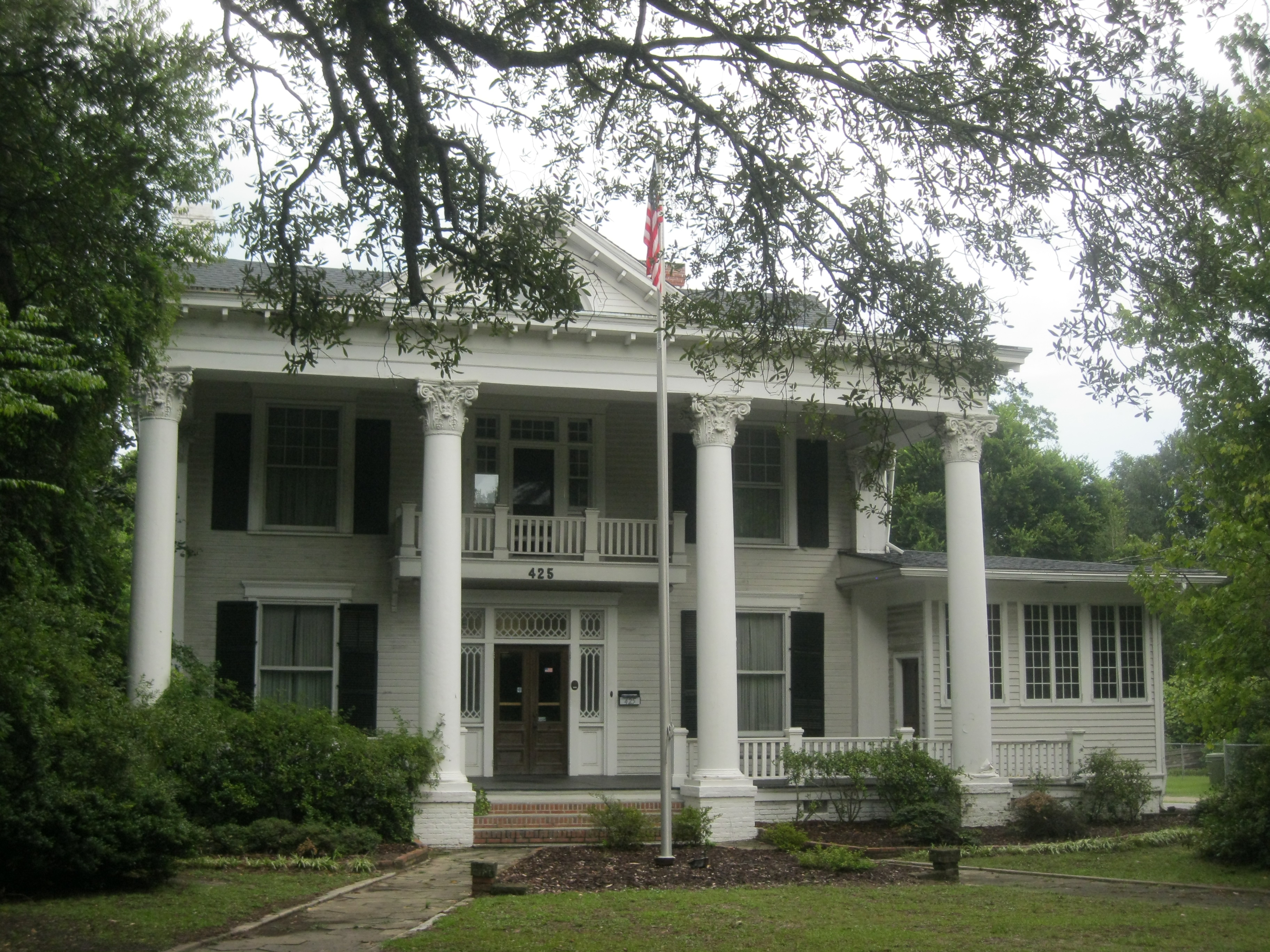

- Location within South Carolina Location within the United States
- Location: 425 N. Main St., Sumter, South Carolina
- Coordinates: 33°55′42″N 80°20′26″W
- Area: less than one acre
- Built: 1908-1909
- Built by: Scarborough, Henry Lee
- Architectural style: Classical Revival
- NRHP reference No.: 94001560
- Added to NRHP: January 20, 1995

Henry Lee Scarborough House, also known as Scarborough Homeplace, is a historic home located at Sumter, Sumter County, South Carolina. It was built in 1908–1909, and is a two-story, three-bay, frame Neo-Classical style dwelling. It features a full height portico supported by four massive columns with Corinthian order capitals.

It was added to the National Register of Historic Places in 1995.

This home was acquired in 2015 by attorney Willie H. Brunson. It is the current location of the Brunson Law Firm, LLC.
