= Heriot-Moise House =

Historic house in South Carolina, United States

- U.S. National Register of Historic Places
- U.S. Historic district
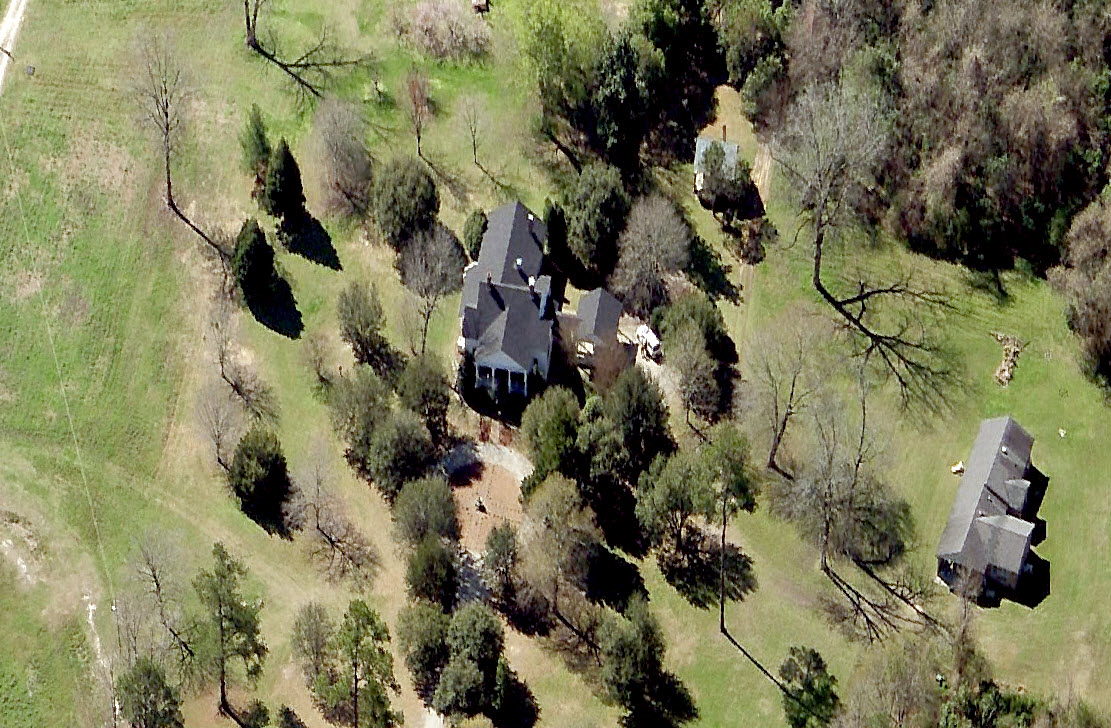
- Aerial view of the house

- Location within South Carolina Location within the United States
- Nearest city: Sumter, South Carolina
- Coordinates: 33°57′36″N 80°18′28″W
- Area: 45.5 acres (18.4 ha)
- Built: 1850
- Architectural style: Greek Revival
- NRHP reference No.: 89002149
- Added to NRHP: December 21, 1989

The Heriot-Moise House, also known as Ingleside, is an historic plantation house located on Brewington Road at Oswego Highway U.S Highway 401 north of Sumter in Sumter County, South Carolina. It is "significant for its illustration of evolving architectural forms and influences from ca. 1790 into the twentieth century, as altered from an essentially vernacular hall-and-parlor house to a residence with Early Classical revival and Greek revival influences. Extant features from the original house and the ca. 1800, ca. 1830, ca. 1850, and later alterations show how succeeding owners adapted the house to their changing needs and circumstances. It is also significant as a basically intact nineteenth and early twentieth century farm complex."

The earliest part of the main house was built around 1790 by a man named Pleasant Tisdale, who had taken title to the surrounding 340 acres (140 ha) in 1787. Around 1850, John Ouldfield Heriot substantially expanded the house to its present appearance. In 1920, the property was acquired by Francis Marion Moise (1893–1968) who adapted it to the needs of his family.

In 1986 Air Force Lt. Col. Eric McConnell and his wife Jeannie McConnell acquired the property from the Moise family, but waited for two years before they started renovations to the house so they could make it their home. In July 1989 they were able to move in with their two children, but within two months Hurricane Hugo caused extensive damage, which necessitated repairs. Later in December 1991 approximately $37,000 (~$75,738 in 2024) worth of damage was done to the interior furnishings by vandals.

On December 21, 1989, the Heriot-Moise House was added to the National Register of Historic Places. The designation includes the surrounding property and several outbuildings including a log slave house which dates to the 1790s and a small house which dates to the early 19th century.
