= Charles T. Mason House =

Historic house in South Carolina, United States

- U.S. National Register of Historic Places
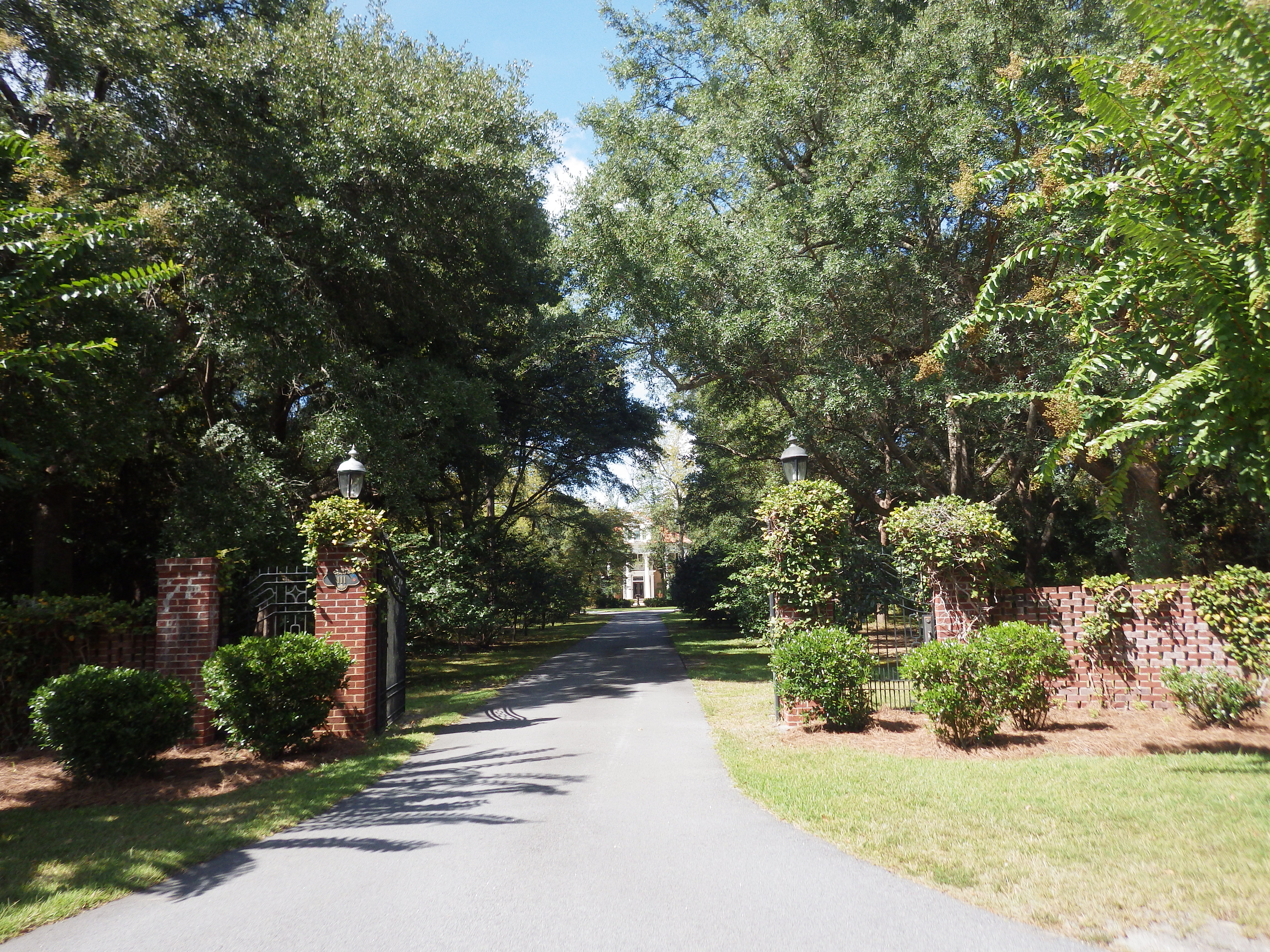
- The house from the front of its driveway

- Location within South Carolina Location within the United States
- Location: 111 Mason Croft, Sumter, South Carolina
- Coordinates: 33°55′50″N 80°21′39″W
- Area: 10.5 acres (4.2 ha)
- Built: 1905
- Architectural style: Classical Revival
- NRHP reference No.: 97000745
- Added to NRHP: July 3, 1997

Charles T. Mason House, also known as Mason Croft, is a historic home located at Sumter, Sumter County, South Carolina. It was built about 1904, and is a two-story, brick Neo-Classical style dwelling. It features a full height portico supported by six fluted columns with Corinthian order capitals. Also on the property are a contributing playhouse and garage.

It was added to the National Register of Historic Places in 1997.
