= Sumter Historic District =

Historic district in South Carolina, United States

- U.S. National Register of Historic Places
- U.S. Historic district
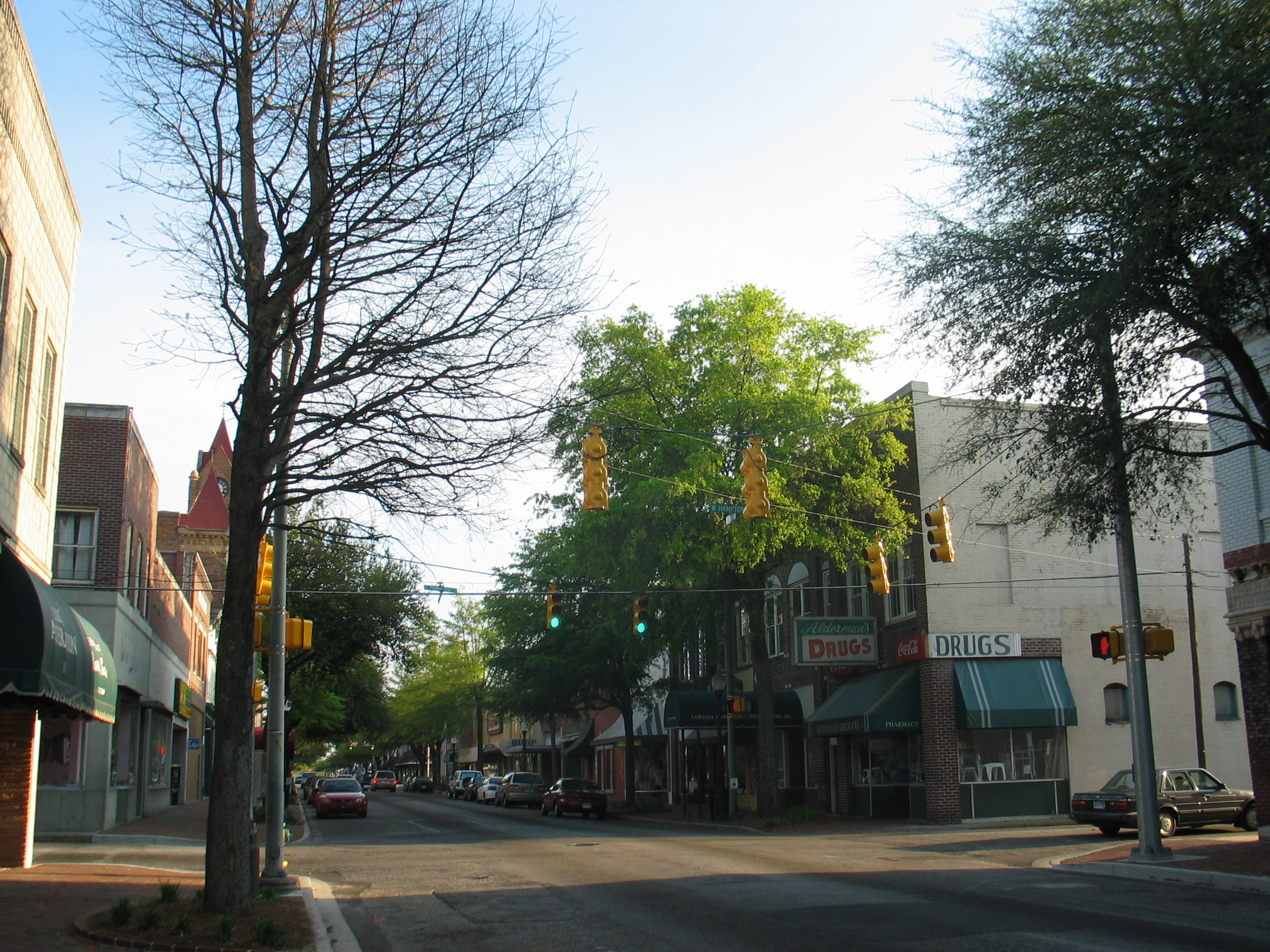
- Sumter Historic District, April 2007

- Location within South Carolina Location within the United States
- Location: Commercial area centered around Main and Liberty Sts., Sumter, South Carolina
- Coordinates: 33°55′13″N 80°20′30″W
- Area: 35 acres (14 ha)
- Architect: Solomon, A.A.
- Architectural style: Classical Revival, Romanesque, Richardsonian Romanesque
- NRHP reference No.: 75001707
- Added to NRHP: April 21, 1975

Sumter Historic District is a national historic district located at Sumter, Sumter County, South Carolina. It encompasses 62 contributing buildings in the central business district of Sumter. It includes buildings that primarily date from 1880 to 1912. They are typical of turn-of-the-20th century commercial buildings, using materials such as pressed tin, limestone, and brick. Notable buildings include the Sumter County Courthouse, Sumter Town Hall-Opera House, Lee and Moise Building, Bultman Brothers' Boots and Shoes, Bank of Sumter, and Burns Hardware.

It was added to the National Register of Historic Places in 1975.
