= Goodwill Parochial School =

- U.S. National Register of Historic Places
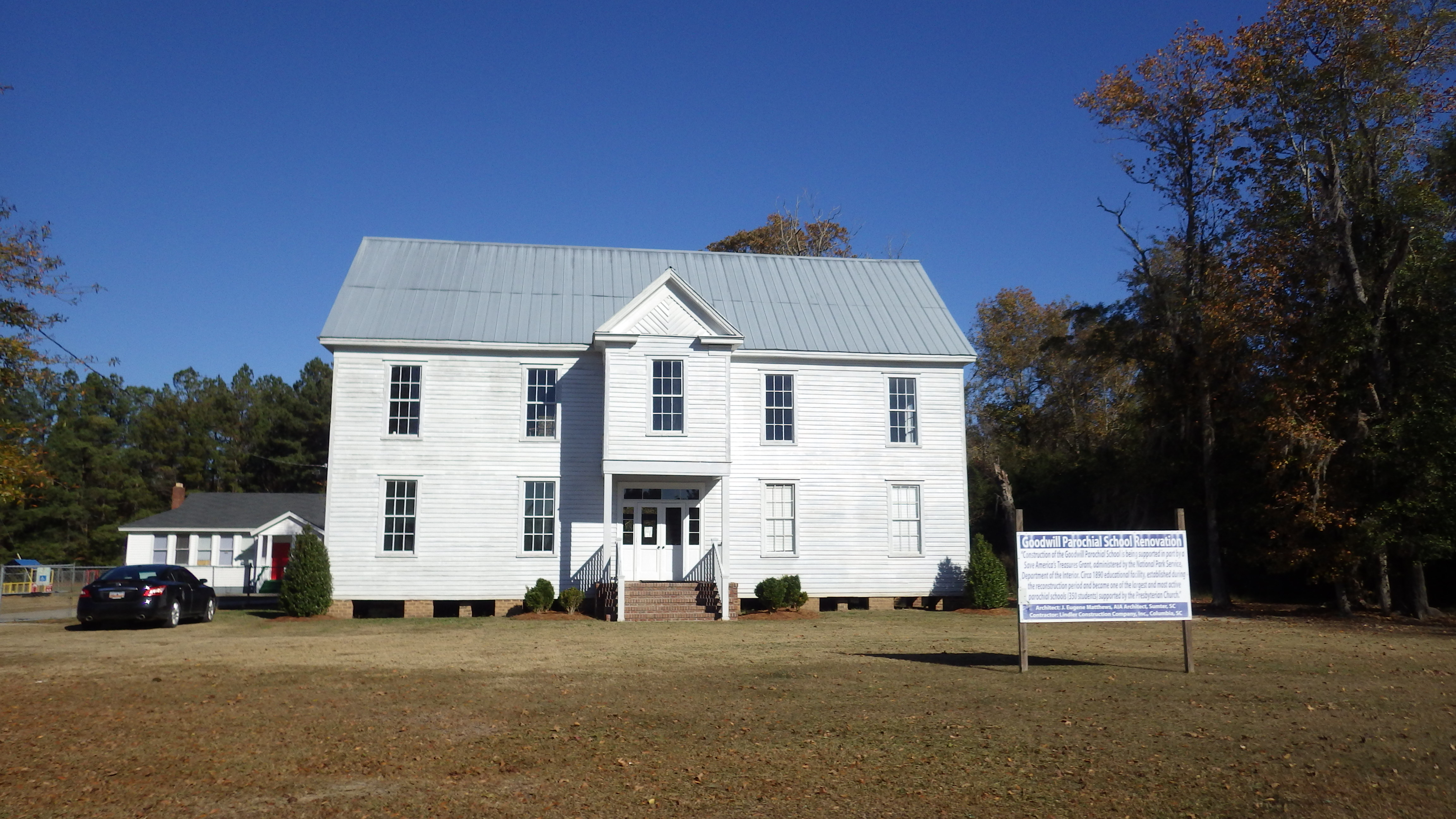

- Location within South Carolina Location within the United States
- Location: 295 N. Brick Church Rd., near Mayesville, South Carolina
- Coordinates: 33°54′44″N 80°8′57″W
- Area: less than one acre
- Built: c. 1890
- NRHP reference No.: 97000523
- Added to NRHP: May 30, 1997

Goodwill Parochial School, also known as Goodwill Day School, was a parochial school for African American children located near Mayesville, Sumter County, South Carolina. It was added to the National Register of Historic Places in 1997.

About 1890, a vernacular two-story, frame building was constructed for the school. It is sheathed in weatherboard and set upon a brick pier foundation. The school was sponsored and supported by the Presbyterian Church in the U.S.A. until 1933. From 1933 it was supported by Goodwill Presbyterian Church until 1960 when it was consolidated with the public schools.
