= Singleton's Graveyard =

- U.S. National Register of Historic Places
- Location within South Carolina Location within the United States
- Nearest city: Wedgefield, South Carolina
- Coordinates: 33°49′52.5″N 80°33′14.8″W
- Area: 2.1 acres (0.85 ha)
- Architect: Ottaviano Gori
- NRHP reference No.: 76001713
- Added to NRHP: May 13, 1976

Singleton's Graveyard is an historic plantation cemetery located off SC 261 in the High Hills of Santee, 6 miles south of Wedgefield, South Carolina. On May 13, 1976, it was added to the National Register of Historic Places.

== History ==
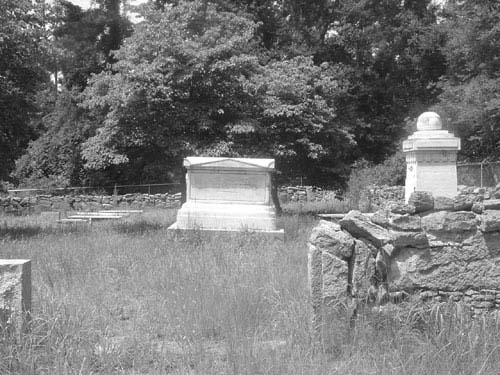
The main entrance of Singleton's Graveyard, facing east

Singleton's Graveyard was the family cemetery for the wealthy and prominent Singleton family descended from Col. Matthew Singleton (1728–1787), who settled in the area in the mid-18th century. It is located on Melrose Plantation built in 1760, one of the family's many plantations. All that remains of Melrose, though, is the graveyard. The 43 known graves date from 1794 to 1944. Many are Singleton family members, including Matthew Singleton himself. The most notable grave marker is that for Governor George McDuffie (1790–1851), husband of Mary Rebecca Singleton, daughter of Col. Richard Singleton. It was designed by noted sculptor Ottaviano Gori of New York City. William Tennant (1740-1777], noted Presbyterian minister and politician, is believed to be buried here, since his widow recorded in their family Bible that he died at "Captain Singleton's High Hills of Santee, August 11, 1777 ...".

== Singleton - Van Buren connection ==
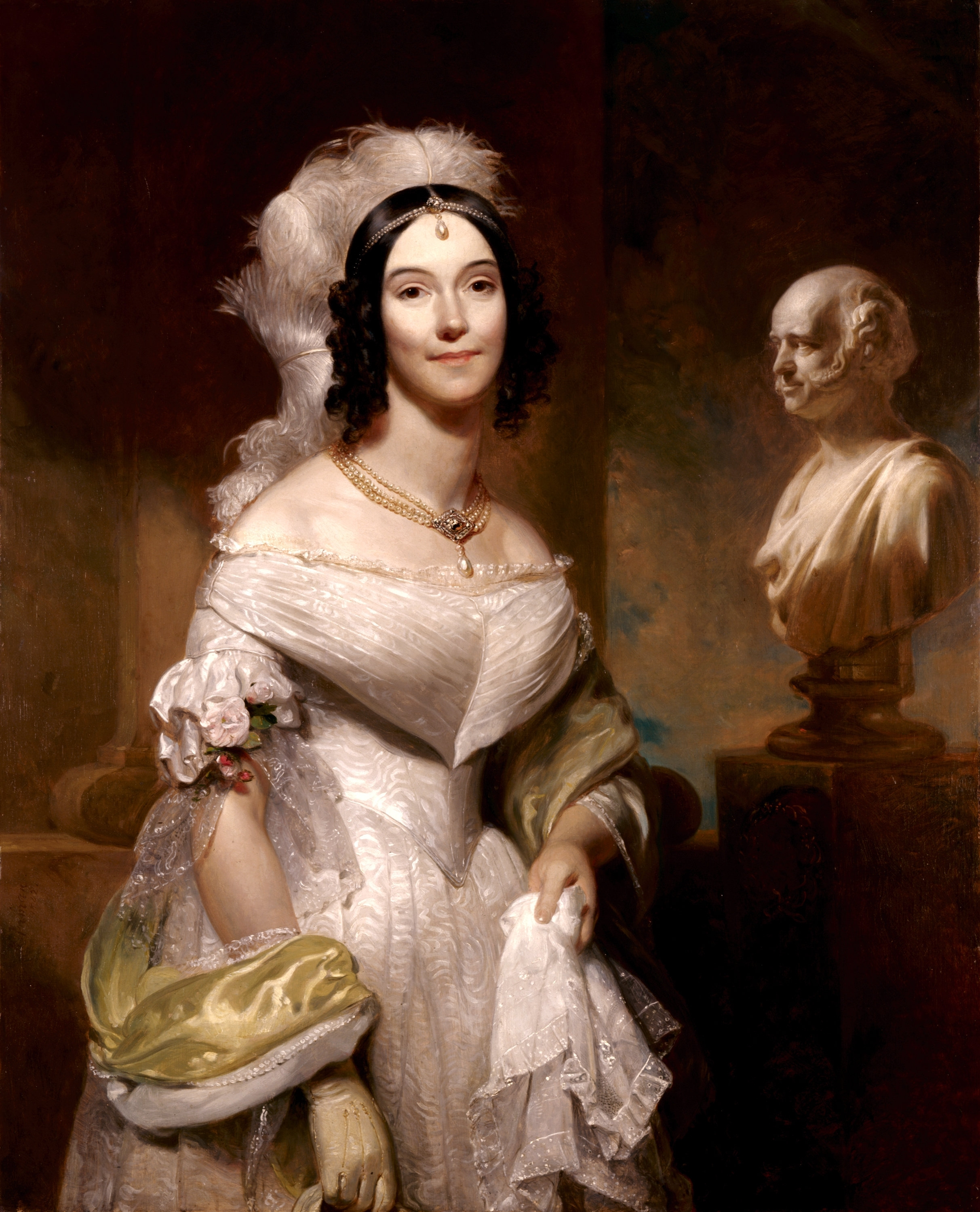
Portrait of Sarah Angelica Singleton Van Buren by Henry Inman (1842)

Sarah Angelica Singleton, daughter of Col. Richard Singleton and his wife, Rebecca Travis Coles, married Abraham Van Buren on November 27, 1838, at her parents’ home in Wedgefield. Her father-in-law, Martin Van Buren, was then eighth President of the United States and she served as First Lady during the rest of his time in the White House.

== See also ==
- List of Registered Historic Places in South Carolina
