= Mayesville Historic District =

Historic district in South Carolina, United States

- U.S. National Register of Historic Places
- U.S. Historic district
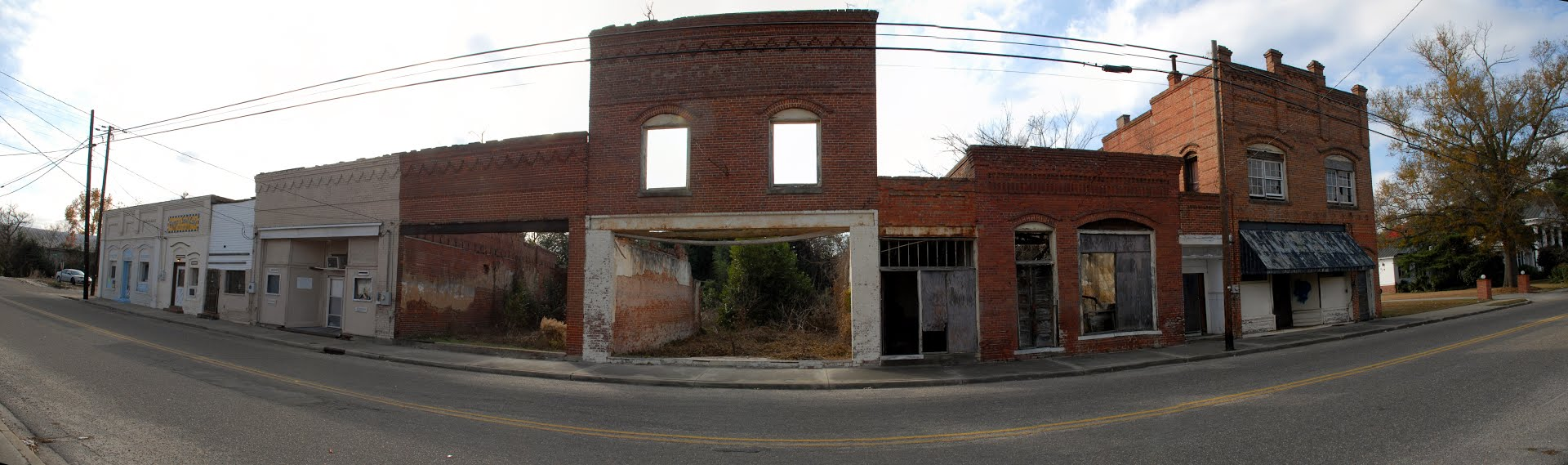

- Location within South Carolina Location within the United States
- Location: Irregular pattern along Lafayette St., Mayesville, South Carolina
- Coordinates: 33°59′8″N 80°12′26″W
- Area: 180 acres (73 ha)
- Architectural style: Greek Revival, Neo-classical
- NRHP reference No.: 79002395
- Added to NRHP: July 16, 1979

Mayesville Historic District is a national historic district located at Mayesville, Sumter County, South Carolina. It encompasses 62 contributing buildings in the western half of the town of Mayesville. It includes a broad range of late-19th and early-20th century vernacular architectural design, including commercial, residential (majority), and religious buildings. The district includes representative examples of the Neo-Classical, Victorian, Queen Anne, Colonial Revival, Greek Revival, and Bungalow. Notable buildings include the Town Hall, Kineen Hotel, Bland Stables, Granit Building, Davis Store, J. W. Rhodes House, and R. J. Mayes House.

It was added to the National Register of Historic Places in 1979.
