= Governor Manning =

Governor Manning may refer to:

- John Lawrence Manning (1816–1889), 65th Governor of South Carolina
- Richard Irvine Manning I (1789–1836), 50th Governor of South Carolina
- Richard Irvine Manning III (1859–1931), 92nd Governor of South Carolina
- William Manning (colonial governor) (1863–1932), 23rd Governor of British Ceylon
