= C. Vann Woodward =

American historian (1908–1999)

- Born: Comer Vann Woodward; November 13, 1908; Vanndale, Arkansas, U.S.
- Died: December 17, 1999 (aged 91); Hamden, Connecticut, U.S.
- Education: Emory University (BA); Columbia University (MA); University of North Carolina, Chapel Hill (PhD)
- Awards: Bancroft Prize (1952); Pulitzer Prize for History (1982)
- Scientific career
- Workplaces: Yale University; Johns Hopkins University
- Doctoral advisor: Howard K. Beale
- Doctoral students: John W. Blassingame
- Other notable students: Barbara J. Fields; Sheldon Hackney; Steven Hahn; Richard J. Jensen; James M. McPherson; Edward L. Ayers

Comer Vann Woodward (November 13, 1908 – December 17, 1999) was an American historian who focused primarily on the American South and race relations. He was long a supporter of the approach of Charles A. Beard, stressing the influence of unseen economic motivations in politics.

Woodward was on the left end of the history profession in the 1930s. By the 1950s he was a leading liberal and supporter of civil rights. His book The Strange Career of Jim Crow makes the case that racial segregation was an invention of the late 19th century rather than an inevitable post-Civil-War development. After attacks on him by the New Left in the late 1960s, he moved to the right politically. He won a Pulitzer Prize for History for his annotated edition of Mary Chestnut's Civil War diaries.

== Early life and education ==
C. Vann Woodward was born in Vanndale, Arkansas, a town named after his mother's family and the county seat from 1886 to 1903. It was in Cross County in eastern Arkansas. Woodward attended high school in Morrilton, Arkansas. He attended Henderson-Brown College, a small Methodist school in Arkadelphia, for two years. In 1930, he transferred to Emory University in Atlanta, Georgia, where his uncle was dean of students and professor of sociology. After graduating, he taught English composition for two years at Georgia Tech in Atlanta. There he met Will W. Alexander, head of the Commission on Interracial Cooperation, and J. Saunders Redding, a historian at Atlanta University.

Woodward enrolled in graduate school at Columbia University in 1931 and received his M.A. from that institution in 1932. In New York, Woodward met, and was influenced by, W. E. B. Du Bois, Langston Hughes, and other figures who were associated with the Harlem Renaissance movement. After receiving his master's degree in 1932, Woodward worked for the defense of Angelo Herndon, a young African-American Communist Party member who had been accused of subversive activities. He also traveled to the Soviet Union and Germany in 1932.

He did graduate work in history and sociology at the University of North Carolina. He was granted a Ph.D. in history in 1937, using as his dissertation the manuscript he had already finished on Thomas E. Watson. Woodward's dissertation director was Howard K. Beale, a Reconstruction specialist who promoted the Beardian economic interpretation of history that deemphasized ideology and ideas and stressed material self-interest as a motivating factor.

In World War II, Woodward served in the Navy, assigned to write the history of major battles. His The Battle for Leyte Gulf (1947) became the standard study of the titular battle, the largest naval battle in history.

== Career ==
Woodward, starting out on the left politically, wanted to use history to explore dissent. He approached W. E. B. Du Bois about writing about him, and thought of following his biography of Watson with one of Eugene V. Debs. He picked Georgia politician Tom Watson, who in the 1890s was a populist leader focusing the anger and hatred of poor whites against the establishment, banks, railroads and businessmen. Watson in 1908 was the presidential candidate of the Populist Party, but this time was the leader in mobilizing the hatred of the same poor whites against blacks, and a promoter of lynching.

=== The Strange Career of Jim Crow ===
Woodward's most influential book was The Strange Career of Jim Crow (1955), which explained that segregation was a relatively late development and was not inevitable. After the Supreme Court's decision in Brown v. Board of Education, in spring 1954, Woodward gave the Richards Lectures at the University of Virginia. The lectures were published in 1955 as The Strange Career of Jim Crow. Popular myth holds that Martin Luther King Jr. called The Strange Career "the historical Bible of the Civil Rights Movement" in a speech at Montgomery, Alabama on March 23, 1956, though he did not do so; he did cite the book and aver that it proved racial segregation was "a political stratagem", in King's words, and not a natural state of American society. It reached a large popular audience and helped shape the civil rights movement of the 1950s and 1960s.

Jim Crow laws, Woodward argued, were not part of the immediate aftermath of Reconstruction; they came later and were not inevitable. Following the Compromise of 1877, into the 1880s there were localized informal practices of racial separation in some areas of society along with what he termed "forgotten alternatives" in others. Finally the 1890s saw white southerners "capitulate to racism" to create "legally prescribed, rigidly enforced, state-wide Jim Crowism."

=== Origins of the New South, 1877–1913 ===
Origins of the New South, 1877–1913 was published in 1951 by Louisiana State University Press as a multivolume history of the South. It combined the Beardian theme of economic forces shaping history and the Faulknerian tone of tragedy and decline. He insisted on the discontinuity of the era and rejected both the romantic antebellum popular images of the Lost Cause school and the overoptimistic business boosterism of the New South Creed. Sheldon Hackney, a Woodward student, hailed the book.

=== Appointments, teaching and awards ===
Woodward was elected to the American Academy of Arts and Sciences in 1958 and the American Philosophical Society in 1959.

Woodward taught at Johns Hopkins University from 1946 to 1961. He became Sterling Professor of History at Yale from 1961 to 1977, where he taught both graduate students and undergraduates. He did extensive writing but little original research at Yale, frequently writing essays for such outlets as the New York Review of Books. He directed 25 PhD dissertations, including those by

- John W. Blassingame, former chair of the African American studies program at Yale
- James M. McPherson, Professor of History at Princeton University
- J. Morgan Kousser, Professor of History at California Institute of Technology
- J. Mills Thornton, Professor of History at University of Michigan
- Patricia Nelson Limerick, Professor of History at the University of Colorado at Boulder
- Lawrence N. Powell, Professor of History at Tulane University
- Michel Wayne, Professor of History at the University of Toronto
- Steven Hahn, Professor of History at the New York University
- John Herbert Roper, Richardson Chair of American History at Emory & Henry College
- Barbara Fields, Professor of History at Columbia University

In April 1974, following the Watergate scandal, John Doar of the U.S. House Committee on the Judiciary asked Woodward for an historical study on presidential misconduct to inform the impeachment process against Richard Nixon. Woodward and fourteen other historians submitted a complete 400-page report in late June, titled "Responses of the Presidents to Charges of Misconduct". However, Nixon resigned a few weeks later, and the report entered public domain. In 2019, the study was republished as "Presidential Misconduct" with additional coverage leading up to and including Barack Obama.

In 1978, the National Endowment for the Humanities selected Woodward for the Jefferson Lecture, the federal government's highest honor for achievement in the humanities. His lecture, entitled "The European Vision of America", was later incorporated into his book The Old World's New World.

Woodward won the Pulitzer Prize in 1982 for Mary Chesnut's Civil War, an edited version of Mary Chesnut's Civil War diary. He won the Bancroft Prize for Origins of the New South.

== Move to the right ==
Peter Novick stated, "Vann Woodward was always very conflicted about the 'presentism' of his work. He alternated between denying it, qualifying it, and apologizing for it." The British historian Michael O'Brien, the editor of Woodward's letters in 2013, says that by the 1970s

He became greatly troubled by the rise of the black power movement, disliked affirmative action, never came to grips with feminism, mistrusted what came to be known as "theory", and became a strong opponent of multiculturalism and "political correctness".

In 1969, as president of the American Historical Association, Woodward led the fight to defeat a proposal by New Left historians to politicize the organization. He wrote his daughter afterwards, "The preparations paid off and I had pretty well second-guessed the Rads on every turn."

In 1975–76 Woodward led the unsuccessful fight at Yale to block the temporary appointment of the communist historian Herbert Aptheker to teach a course. Radicals denounced his actions but a joint committee of the Organization of American Historians and the American Historical Association exonerated the process and found that there was no evidence that political criteria had been used. In 1987 he joined the conservative scholars who made up the National Association of Scholars, a group that explicitly opposes the academic left. Woodward wrote a favorable review in the New York Review of Books of Dinesh D'Souza's Illiberal Education: The Politics of Race and Sex on Campus. It said that Duke University used racial criteria when it hired John Hope Franklin, who publicly feuded with Woodward. Hackney stated, "Woodward became an open critic of political correctness and in other ways appeared to have shifted his seat at the political table."

== Death and legacy ==
C. Vann Woodward died December 17, 1999, in Hamden, Connecticut, at the age of 91.

Woodward cautioned that the academicians had themselves abdicated their role as storytellers:

Professionals do well to apply the term "amateur" with caution to the historian outside their ranks. The word does have deprecatory and patronizing connotations that occasionally backfire. This is especially true of narrative history, which nonprofessionals have all but taken over. The gradual withering of the narrative impulse in favor of the analytical urge among professional academic historians has resulted in a virtual abdication of the oldest and most honored role of the historian, that of storyteller. Having abdicated... the professional is in a poor position to patronize amateurs who fulfill the needed function he has abandoned.

The Southern Historical Association has established the C. Vann Woodward Dissertation Prize, awarded annually to the best dissertation on Southern history. There is a Peter V. and C. Vann Woodward Chair of History at Yale; it is now held by southern historian Glenda Gilmore. (Peter was Woodward's son, who died at the age of 26 in 1969.)

He was a Charter member of the Fellowship of Southern Writers.

== Works ==
=== Books ===
- Tom Watson, Agrarian Rebel (1938)
- The Battle for Leyte Gulf (1947, new ed. 1965) online
- Origins of the New South, 1877–1913 (1951) borrow for 14 days
- Reunion and Reaction: The Compromise of 1877 and the End of Reconstruction (1951, rev. edn 1991)
- The Strange Career of Jim Crow. (1st edn February 1955; 2nd edn August 1965; 3rd edn NY: Oxford University Press, 1974). ISBN 978-0-19-501805-9. borrow for 14 days
- The Age of Reinterpretation (1961), pamphlet
- The Burden of Southern History (1955; 3rd edn 1993)
- The Comparative Approach to American History (1968), editor
- American Counterpoint (1971), essays
- Mary Chesnut's Civil War (1981), editor. Pulitzer Prize.
- Oxford History of the United States (1982–2018), series editor.
- The Private Mary Chestnut: The Unpublished Civil War Diaries (1984), edited with Elizabeth Muhlenfeld. online
- Thinking Back: The Perils of Writing History (Louisiana State University Press, 1986). memoirs
- The Old World's New World (1991), lectures online
- The Letters of C. Vann Woodward, ed. Michael O'Brien (Yale University Press, 2013)
- The Lost Lectures of C. Vann Woodward. Oxford University Press. (2020).

=== Major journal articles ===
- "Tom Watson and the Negro in Agrarian Politics". Journal of Southern History, Vol. 4, No. 1 (February 1938), pp. 14–33.
- "The Irony of Southern History". Journal of Southern History, Vol. 19, No. 1 (February 1953), pp. 3–19.
- "The Political Legacy of Reconstruction". Journal of Negro Education, Vol. 26, No. 3, The Negro Voter in the South (Summer 1957), pp. 231–240.
- "The Age of Reinterpretation". American Historical Review, Vol. 66, No. 1 (October 1960), pp. 1–19.
- "Seeds of Failure in Radical Race Policy". Proceedings of the American Philosophical Society, Vol. 110, No. 1 (February 18, 1966), pp. 1–9.
- "History and the Third Culture". Journal of Contemporary History, Vol. 3, No. 2, Reappraisals (April 1968), pp. 23–35.
- "The Southern Ethic in a Puritan World". William and Mary Quarterly, Vol. 25, No. 3 (July 1968), pp. 344–370.
- "Clio With Soul". Journal of American History, Vol. 56, No. 1 (June 1969), pp. 5–20.
- "The Future of the Past". American Historical Review, Vol. 75, No. 3 (February 1970), pp. 711–726.
- "The Erosion of Academic Privileges and Immunities". Daedalus, Vol. 103, No. 4, (Fall 1974), pp. 33–37.
- "The Aging of America". American Historical Review, Vol. 82, No. 3 (June 1977), pp. 583–594.
- "The Fall of the American Adam". Bulletin of the American Academy of Arts and Sciences, Vol. 35, No. 2 (November 1981), pp. 26–34.
- "Strange Career Critics: Long May they Persevere". Journal of American History, Vol. 75, No. 3 (December 1988), pp. 857–868.
- "Look Away, Look Away". Journal of Southern History, Vol. 59, No. 3 (August 1993), pp. 487–504.

== Sources ==
- Cobb, James C. (2022). C. Vann Woodward: America's Historian. University of North Carolina Press. ISBN 978-1-4696-7021-8.
