= Atlantic and Mexican Gulf Canal Company =

The Atlantic and Mexican Gulf Canal Company was a canal project approved February 23, 1876 and owned by Joseph E. Johnston, General Lafayette McLaws and Joseph Shepard of Georgia, and others. The purpose was constructing a canal from the St. Marys river in Georgia, across the Okeefinokee Swamp, and thence westward by the most direct and practicable route, as the company may determine, to connect with the waters of the Gulf of Mexico on the coast of Florida, for the purpose of transporting from the Atlantic to the Gulf along the route indicated, and to market on either side, the timber, lumber and other products of the country, and other commercial products as may be offered, and the convenience of the route may determine of may attract to it.

American politician, journalist and industrialist Duff Green also worked with the Gulf Canal Company, hoping to connect the Savannah River with St. Marys and Suwannee Rivers to the Gulf of Mexico.

Florida state law chapter 3500, approved March 1, 1883, gave the company, together with George F. Drew, Jesse J. Finley and George Rainsford Fairbanks of Florida and James S. Bailey of Georgia authority to build the canal in Florida and to extend it along the Gulf coast as far as the western limits of the State, and to connect with any water way which would communicate with Mobile or New Orleans. The company was promised land grants along its line, provided it selected the route within one year, ten miles were finished within two years, and the canal was completed within ten years.

Florida state law chapter 3647, approved February 16, 1885, amended the list of owners to remove George R. Fairbanks and James S. Bailey and add S. A. Swann of Florida and S. L. Burns, Alex Curtis and William Rogers of Savannah, Georgia. Time limits were extended to three years, four years, and ten years.
