= John Lawrence Manning =

American politician

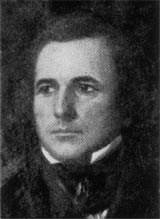

United States Senator-elect from South Carolina
- In office Not seated
- Preceded by: James Chesnut; James Hammond
- Succeeded by: Thomas Robertson; Frederick Sawyer

65th Governor of South Carolina
- In office December 9, 1852 – December 11, 1854
- Lieutenant: James Irby
- Preceded by: John Means
- Succeeded by: James Adams

Personal details
- Born: John Lawrence Manning; January 29, 1816 Clarendon County, South Carolina, U.S.
- Died: October 24, 1889 (aged 73) Camden, South Carolina, U.S.
- Resting place: Trinity Episcopal Cathedral
- Party: Democratic
- Spouse(s): Susan Frances Hampton; Sally Bland Clarke
- Education: Princeton University; University of South Carolina (BA)

Military service
- Allegiance: Confederate States
- Branch/service: Confederate States Army
- Rank: Colonel
- Battles/wars: American Civil War

John Lawrence Manning (sometimes spelled John Laurence Manning) (January 29, 1816 – October 24, 1889) was the 65th governor of South Carolina, from 1854 to 1856, and, though elected to the U.S. Senate in 1865, was refused a seat there because of his former Confederate allegiance.

== Background and career ==
He was born in Clarendon County, son of Richard Irvine Manning and Elizabeth Peyre (Richardson) Manning. His father was the Governor of South Carolina from 1824 to 1826. John Manning attended Princeton University and obtained a degree from South Carolina College, where he was a member of the Euphradian Society. A Democrat, he was a member of the South Carolina House of Representatives from 1842 to 1846 and of the South Carolina Senate from 1846 to 1852. After his single term as governor, the state constitution made him ineligible for immediate re-election. He was a signer of South Carolina's ordinance of secession in 1860. During the American Civil War, while serving again in the South Carolina Senate from 1861 to 1865, Manning was also a colonel on the staff of P.G.T. Beauregard, a Confederate general. In 1865, after the war, the state General Assembly elected him to the United States Senate but, because of his prominent role in South Carolina's secession and the ensuing war, the Senate refused him a seat. He served again in the state house of representatives from 1865 to 1867 and, after the withdrawal of Union troops, in the state senate from 1877 to '78.

In an elite planter society that prided itself on its social grace, Manning was noted for his appealing appearance and demeanor, which possessed one observer to ask, "Who that has ever met him can be indifferent to the charms of manner and of personal appearance, which render the ex-Governor of the state so attractive?" In her famous diary, Mary Chesnut called Manning "the handsomest man alive."

== Marriages and children ==
In 1838, John L. Manning married Susan Frances Hampton (1816–1845), daughter of General Wade Hampton I and his wife, Mary Cantey, and half-sister of Colonel Wade Hampton II, who though he alone inherited their father's considerable fortune, shared it equally with her and another sister. She died giving birth to their third child. In 1848 Manning married Sally Bland Clarke and had four children by her. During his term in office, he resided at the Preston C. Lorick House.

== Millford Plantation ==
John Manning and his wife, Susan, had Millford Plantation built in 1839 near Pinewood, South Carolina. It is now a National Historic Landmark.

== Slave owner ==
According to the 1860 United States Slave Census Schedule, John Manning owned 670 enslaved African-Americans.

== Burial ==
He is interred in the churchyard at Trinity Episcopal Church in Columbia, South Carolina.

== Honors ==
The town of Manning, South Carolina was named for him.

Political offices
Preceded by John Means	Governor of South Carolina; 1852–1854	Succeeded by James Adams
U.S. Senate
Preceded by James Chesnut; James Hammond	U.S. Senator-elect from South Carolina; 1866; Served alongside: Benjamin Perry (elect)	Succeeded by Thomas Robertson; Frederick Sawyer
