= Joseph E. Johnston =

Confederate Army general (1807–1891)

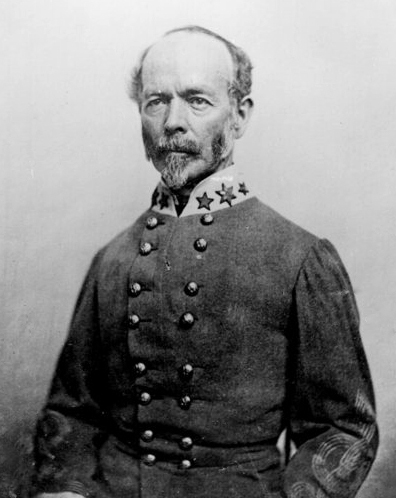
- Johnston in uniform, c. 1862

Member of the U.S. House of Representatives from Virginia's 3rd district
- In office March 4, 1879 – March 4, 1881
- Preceded by: Gilbert Carlton Walker
- Succeeded by: George D. Wise

Personal details
- Born: Joseph Eggleston Johnston; February 3, 1807 Farmville, Virginia, U.S.
- Died: March 21, 1891 (aged 84) Washington, D.C., U.S.
- Resting place: Green Mount Cemetery, Baltimore, Maryland, U.S.
- Party: Democratic
- Spouse: Lydia McLane Johnston
- Education: United States Military Academy
- Nickname: Joe

Military service
- Allegiance: United States; Confederate States
- Branch/service: United States Army; Confederate States Army
- Years of service: 1829–1861 (USA); 1861–1865 (CSA)
- Rank: Brigadier General (USA); General (CSA)
- Commands: Army of the Shenandoah (1861); Army of Northern Virginia (1861–1862); Department of the West (1862–1863); Army of Tennessee (1863–1864); Department of South Carolina, Georgia, and Florida (1865); Department of North Carolina and Southern Virginia (1865)
- Battles/wars: Seminole Wars; First Battle of the Loxahatchee; Mexican–American War; Battle of Cerro Gordo; Battle of Chapultepec; American Civil War; First Battle of Bull Run; Peninsula Campaign; Siege of Yorktown; Battle of Seven Pines (WIA); Vicksburg Campaign; Atlanta campaign; Battle of Bentonville

Joseph Eggleston Johnston (February 3, 1807 – March 21, 1891) was an American military officer and politician who served in the United States Army during the Mexican–American War and in the Seminole Wars. After Virginia declared secession from the United States in 1861, he entered the Confederate States Army as one of its most senior general officers during the American Civil War.

Johnston was trained as a civil engineer at the United States Military Academy at West Point, New York, graduating in the same class as Robert E. Lee. He later saw frontier service in Florida, Texas, and Kansas and by 1860 he achieved the rank of brigadier general as Quartermaster General of the U.S. Army.

Johnston's effectiveness in the American Civil War was undercut by tensions with Confederate president Jefferson Davis. Victory eluded him in most campaigns he personally commanded. He was the senior Confederate commander at the First Battle of Bull Run in July 1861, but the victory is usually credited to his subordinate, P. G. T. Beauregard. Johnston defended the Confederate capital of Richmond, Virginia, during the 1862 Peninsula Campaign, withdrawing under the pressure of George B. McClellan's superior force. He suffered a severe wound at the Battle of Seven Pines and was replaced by Robert E. Lee.

In 1863, Johnston was placed in command of the Department of the West. In 1864, he commanded the Army of Tennessee against William Tecumseh Sherman in the Atlanta campaign. In the war's final days, Johnston was returned to command of the few remaining forces in the Carolinas campaign. U.S. Army generals Ulysses S. Grant and Sherman praised his actions in the war and became friends with Johnston afterward.

After the war, Johnston served as an executive in the railroad and insurance businesses. He was elected as a Democrat in the United States House of Representatives, serving a single term. He was appointed as the federal commissioner of railroads under Grover Cleveland. Johnston died of pneumonia one month after attending Sherman's funeral.

== Early years ==
Johnston was born at Longwood House in "Cherry Grove", near Farmville, Virginia, on February 3, 1807. (Longwood House later burned down. The rebuilt house was the birthplace in 1827 of Charles S. Venable, an officer on the staff of Robert E. Lee. It is now used as the residence of the president of Longwood University.) His grandfather, Peter Johnston, emigrated to Virginia from Scotland in 1726. Joseph was the seventh son of Judge Peter Johnston Jr. (1763–1831) and Mary Valentine Wood (1769–1825), a daughter of Patrick Henry's sister, Lucy Wood. He was named for Major Joseph Eggleston, under whom his father served in the American Revolutionary War, in the command of Henry Lee III. His brother Charles Clement Johnston served as a U.S. congressman, and his nephew John Warfield Johnston was a U.S. senator; both represented Virginia. In 1811, the Johnston family moved to Abingdon, Virginia, a town near the Tennessee border, where his father Peter built a home he named Panecillo.

Johnston attended the United States Military Academy, nominated by John C. Calhoun in 1825 while he was Secretary of War. He was moderately successful in academics and received only a small number of disciplinary demerits. He graduated in 1829, ranking 13th of 46 cadets, and was appointed a second lieutenant in the 4th U.S. Artillery. He would become the first West Point graduate to be promoted to a general officer in the regular army, reaching a higher rank in the U.S. Army than did his 1829 classmate, Robert E. Lee (2nd of 46).

== U.S. Army service ==
Johnston resigned from the Army in March 1837 and studied civil engineering. During the Second Seminole War, he was a civilian topographic engineer aboard a ship led by William Pope McArthur. On January 12, 1838, at Jupiter, Florida, the sailors who had gone ashore were attacked. Johnston said there were "no less than 30 bullet holes" in his clothing, and one bullet creased his scalp, leaving a scar he had for the rest of his life. Having encountered more combat activities in Florida as a civilian than he had previously as an artillery officer, Johnston decided to rejoin the Army. He departed for Washington, D.C., in April 1838 and was appointed a first lieutenant of topographic engineers on July 7; on that same day, he received a brevet promotion to captain for the actions at Jupiter Inlet and his explorations of the Florida Everglades.

On July 10, 1845, in Baltimore, Johnston married Lydia Mulligan Sims McLane (1822–1887), the daughter of Louis McLane and his wife. Her father was the president of the Baltimore and Ohio Railroad, a prominent politician (congressman and senator from Delaware, minister to London, and a member of President Andrew Jackson's cabinet). They had no children.

Johnston was enthusiastic about the outbreak of the Mexican–American War. He served on the staff of Lt. Gen. Winfield Scott in the Siege of Veracruz, having been chosen by Scott to be the officer carrying the demand for surrender beforehand to the provincial governor. He was in the vanguard of the movement inland under Brig. Gen. David E. Twiggs and was severely wounded by grapeshot performing reconnaissance before the Battle of Cerro Gordo. He was appointed a brevet lieutenant colonel for his actions at Cerro Gordo. After recovering in a field hospital, he rejoined the army at Puebla. During the advance toward Mexico City, he was second in command of the "U.S. Regiment of Voltigeurs", a unit composed of light infantry or skirmishers. He distinguished himself at Contreras and Churubusco, was wounded again at Chapultepec, and received two brevet promotions for the latter two engagements, ending the war as a brevet colonel of volunteers. (After the end of hostilities, he reverted to his peacetime rank of captain in the topographical engineers.) Winfield Scott humorously remarked, "Johnston is a great soldier, but he had an unfortunate knack of getting himself shot in nearly every engagement." Johnston's greatest anguish during the war was the death of his nephew, Preston Johnston. When Robert E. Lee informed Johnston that a Mexican artillery shell had killed Preston at Contreras, both officers wept, and Johnston grieved for the remainder of his life.

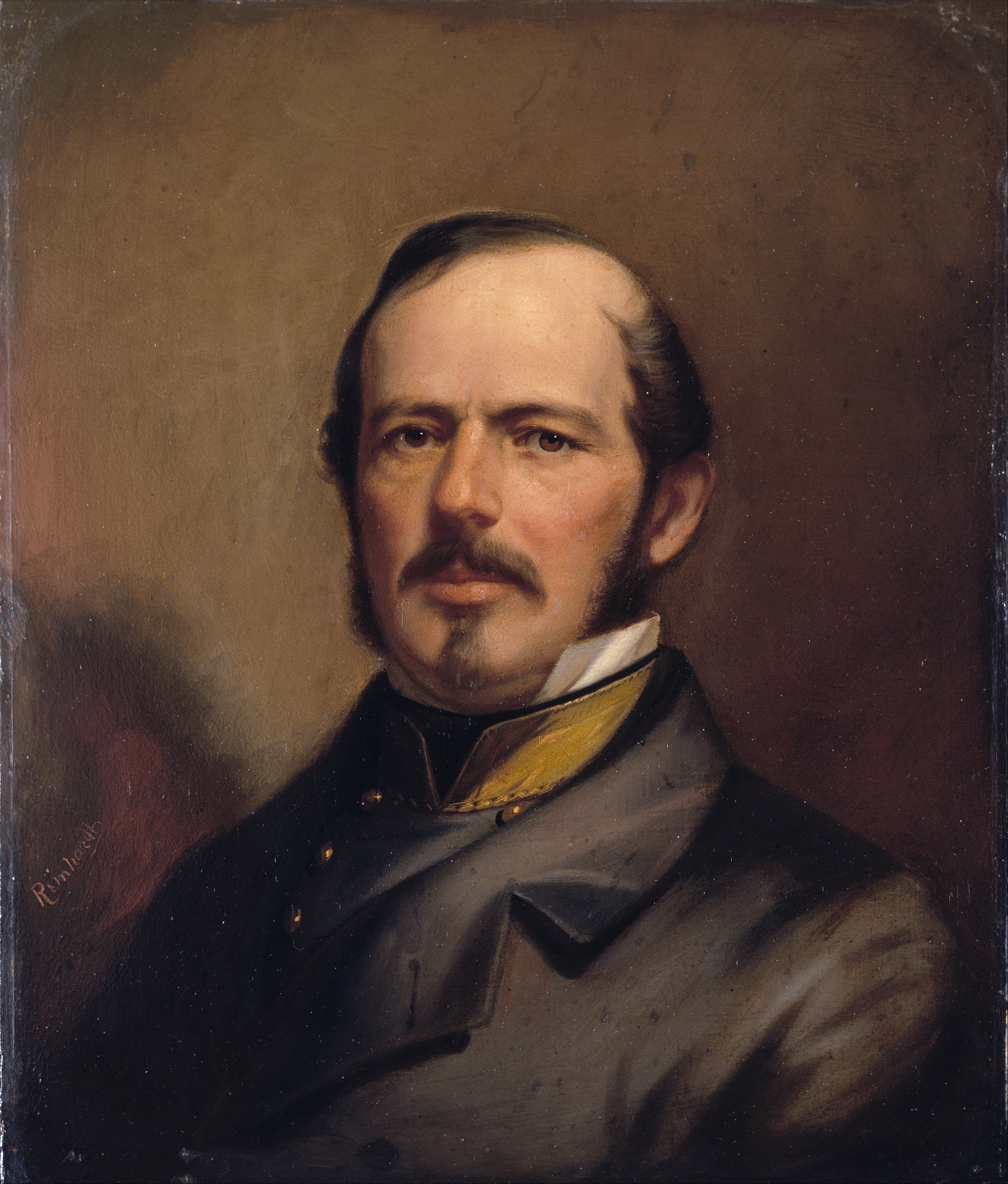
Portrait by Benjamin Franklin Reinhart (c. 1860)

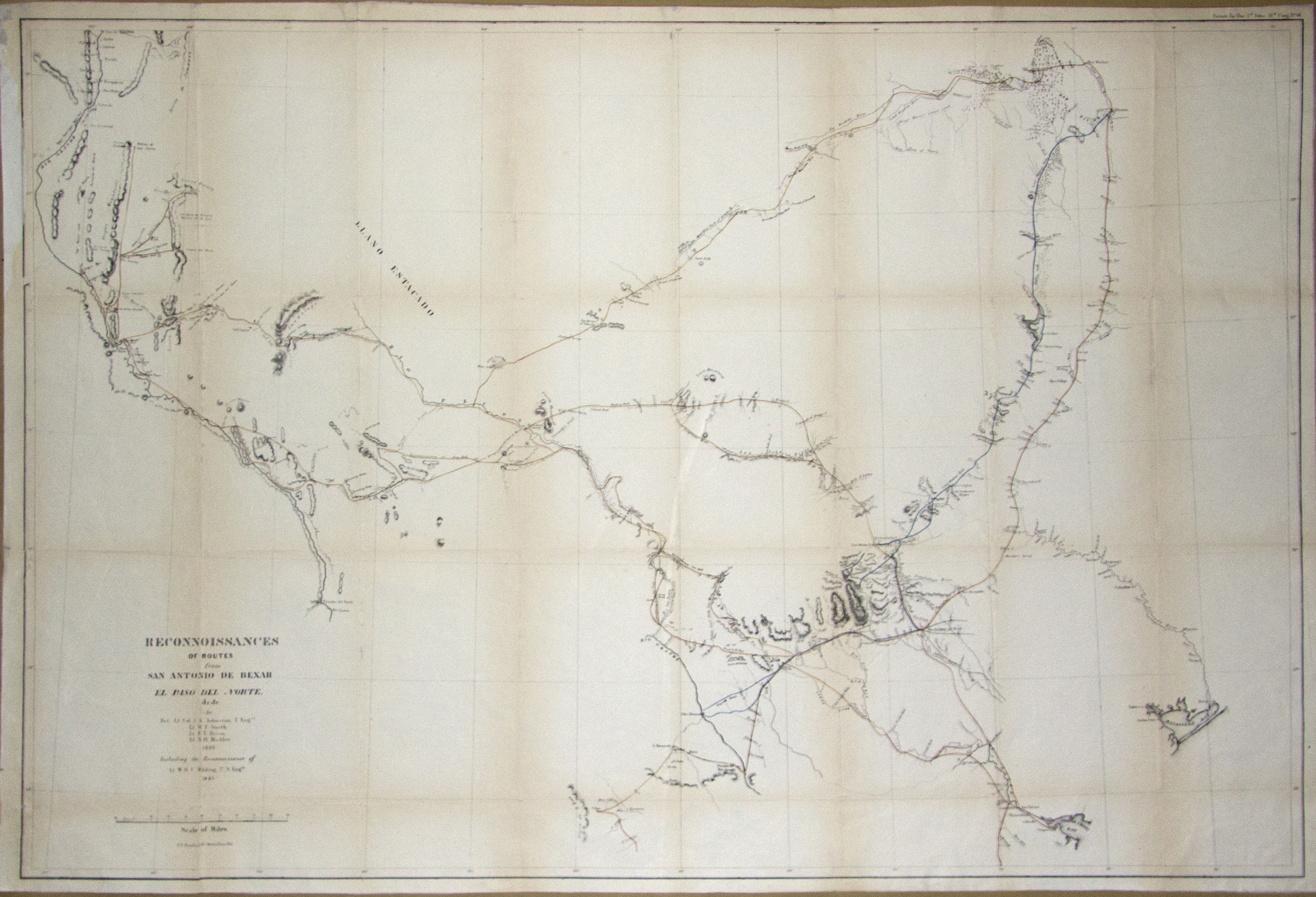
Johnston's map Reconnoissances [sic.] of Routes from San Antonio de Bexar to El Paso del Norte, 1849

Johnston was an engineer on the Texas-United States boundary survey in 1841; he returned to the area, was appointed chief topographical engineer of the Department of Texas and served from 1848 to 1853.

During the 1850s, he sought his previous rank, sending letters to the War Department suggesting that he should be returned to a combat regiment with his wartime rank of colonel. Secretary of War Jefferson Davis, an acquaintance of Johnston's from West Point, rebuffed these suggestions, as he did later during the Civil War, much to Johnston's irritation. Despite this disagreement, Davis thought enough of Johnston to appoint him lieutenant colonel in one of the newly formed regiments, the 1st U.S. Cavalry at Fort Leavenworth, Kansas, under Col. Edwin V. "Bull" Sumner, on March 1, 1855. At this same time, Robert E. Lee was appointed lieutenant colonel of the 2nd U.S. Cavalry under Col. Albert Sidney Johnston (no relation). In this role, Johnston participated in actions against the Sioux in the Wyoming Territory and in the violence over slavery in the future state, known as Bleeding Kansas. He developed a mentor relationship and close friendship with one of his junior officers, Capt. George B. McClellan, who would later command the U.S. Army against Johnston.

In the fall of 1856, Johnston was transferred to a depot for recruits at Jefferson Barracks, Missouri. In 1857 he led surveying expeditions to determine the Kansas border, including a corner monument that would later lead to a Supreme Court case. Later that year, Davis was replaced as Secretary of War by John B. Floyd, a native of Abingdon and a cousin of Johnston's by marriage. He had been a former guardian of Preston Johnston. Floyd made Johnston a brevet colonel for his actions at Cerro Gordo, a promotion that caused grumbling within the Army about favoritism. In 1859, President James Buchanan named Johnston's brother-in-law, Robert Milligan McLane, as minister to Mexico, and Johnston accompanied him on a journey to visit Benito Juárez's government in Veracruz. He was also ordered to inspect possible military routes across the country in case of further hostilities.

Brig. Gen. Thomas Jesup, the Quartermaster General of the U.S. Army, died on June 10, 1860. Winfield Scott was responsible for naming a replacement, but instead of one name, he offered four possibilities: Joseph E. Johnston, Albert Sidney Johnston (no relation), Robert E. Lee, and Charles F. Smith. Although Jefferson Davis, now a member of the Senate Military Affairs Committee, favored Albert Sidney Johnston, Secretary of War Floyd chose Joseph E. Johnston for the position.

Johnston was promoted to brigadier general on June 28, 1860. Johnston did not enjoy the position, preferring field command to administration in Washington. In addition, he suffered from the pressures of the imminent sectional crisis and the ethical dilemma of administering war matériel that might prove useful to his native South. He did not yield to temptation, however, as Secretary of War Floyd was accused of doing.

== Civil War ==
=== Manassas and first friction with President Davis ===
When his native state, Virginia, declared secession from the United States in 1861, Johnston resigned his commission as a brigadier general in the regular army, the highest-ranking U.S. Army officer to do so. He would go on to state, "I believed like most others, that the division of the country would be permanent; and that ... the revolution begun was justified by the maxims so often repeated by Americans, that Free government is founded on the consent of the governed, and that every community strong enough to establish and maintain its independence, has a right to assert it. Having been educated in such opinions, I naturally determined to return to the State of which I was a native, join the people among whom I was born, and live with my kindred, and if necessary, fight in their defense."

He was initially commissioned as a major general in the Virginia militia on May 4, but the Virginia Convention decided two weeks later that only one major general was required in the state army and Robert E. Lee was their choice. Johnston was then offered a state commission as a brigadier general, which he declined, accepting instead a commission as a brigadier general in the Confederate States Army on May 14. Johnston relieved Colonel Thomas J. "Stonewall" Jackson of command at Harpers Ferry in May and organized the Army of the Shenandoah in July.

In the First Battle of Bull Run (First Manassas), July 21, 1861, Johnston rapidly moved his small army from the Shenandoah Valley to reinforce that of Brig. Gen. P. G. T. Beauregard, but he lacked familiarity with the terrain and ceded tactical planning of the battle to the more junior Beauregard as a professional courtesy. At midday, while Beauregard was still unclear about his U.S. opponent's direction in the battle, Johnston decided that the critical point was to the north of his headquarters (the Lewis house, "Portici"), at Henry House Hill. He abruptly announced, "The battle is there. I am going." Beauregard and the staffs of both generals followed his lead and rode off. Johnston encountered a scattered unit, the 4th Alabama, whose field-grade officers had all been killed, and personally rallied the men to reinforce the Confederate line. He consoled the despairing Brig. Gen. Barnard Bee and urged him to lead his men back into the fight. (General Bee's exhortation to his men inspired Stonewall Jackson's nickname.) Beauregard then convinced Johnston that he would be more valuable in organizing the arrival of reinforcements for the remainder of the battle than in providing at-the-front tactical leadership. Although Beauregard claimed the majority of public credit, Johnston's behind-the-scenes role was critical to the Confederate victory. After Bull Run, Johnston assisted Beauregard and William Porcher Miles in the design and production of the Confederate Battle Flag. It was Johnston's idea to make the flag square.

It [the ranking of senior generals] seeks to tarnish my fair fame as a soldier and a man, earned by more than thirty years of laborious and perilous service. I had but this, the scars of many wounds, all honestly taken in my front and in the front of battle, and my father's Revolutionary sword. It was delivered to me from his venerated hand, without a stain of dishonor. Its blade is still unblemished as when it passed from his hand to mine. I drew it in the war, not for rank or fame, but to defend the sacred soil, the homes and hearths, the women and children; aye, and the men of my mother Virginia, my native South.

— Johnston's letter to Jefferson Davis, September 12, 1861

In August, Johnston was promoted to full general—what is called a four-star general in the modern U.S. Army—but was not pleased that three other men he had outranked in the "old Army" now outranked him, even though Davis backdated his promotion to July 4. Johnston felt that, since he was the senior officer to leave the U.S. Army and join the Confederacy, he should not be ranked behind Samuel Cooper, Albert Sidney Johnston, and Robert E. Lee. Only Beauregard was placed behind Johnston on the list of five new generals. This led to much bad blood between Johnston and Jefferson Davis, lasting throughout the war. The crux of Davis's counterargument was that Johnston's U.S. commission as a brigadier general was as a staff officer and that his highest line commission was as a lieutenant colonel; both Sidney Johnston and Lee had been full colonels. Johnston sent an intemperately worded letter to Davis, who was offended enough to discuss its tone with his cabinet.

Johnston was placed in command of the Department of the Potomac and the Confederate Army of the Potomac on July 21, 1861, and the Department of Northern Virginia on October 22. From July to November 1861, he was headquartered at the Conner House in Manassas. The winter of 1861–62 was relatively quiet for Johnston in his Centreville headquarters, concerned primarily with organization and equipment issues, as the principal Northern army, also named Army of the Potomac, was being organized by George B. McClellan. McClellan perceived Johnston's army as overwhelmingly strong in its fortifications, prompting him to plan an amphibious movement around Johnston's flank. In early March, learning of U.S. offensive preparations, Johnston withdrew his army to Culpeper Court House. This movement had repercussions on both sides. President Davis was surprised and disappointed by the unannounced move, which he considered a "precipitate retreat." At about this time, Davis moved to restrict Johnston's authority by bringing Robert E. Lee to Richmond as his military adviser. He began issuing direct orders to some of the forces under Johnston's ostensible command. On the Northern side, McClellan was publicly embarrassed when it was revealed that the Confederate position had not been nearly as strong as he had portrayed. But more importantly, it required him to replan his spring offensive, and instead of an amphibious landing at his preferred target of Urbanna, he chose the Virginia Peninsula, between the James and York Rivers, as his avenue of approach toward Richmond.

=== Peninsula Campaign ===
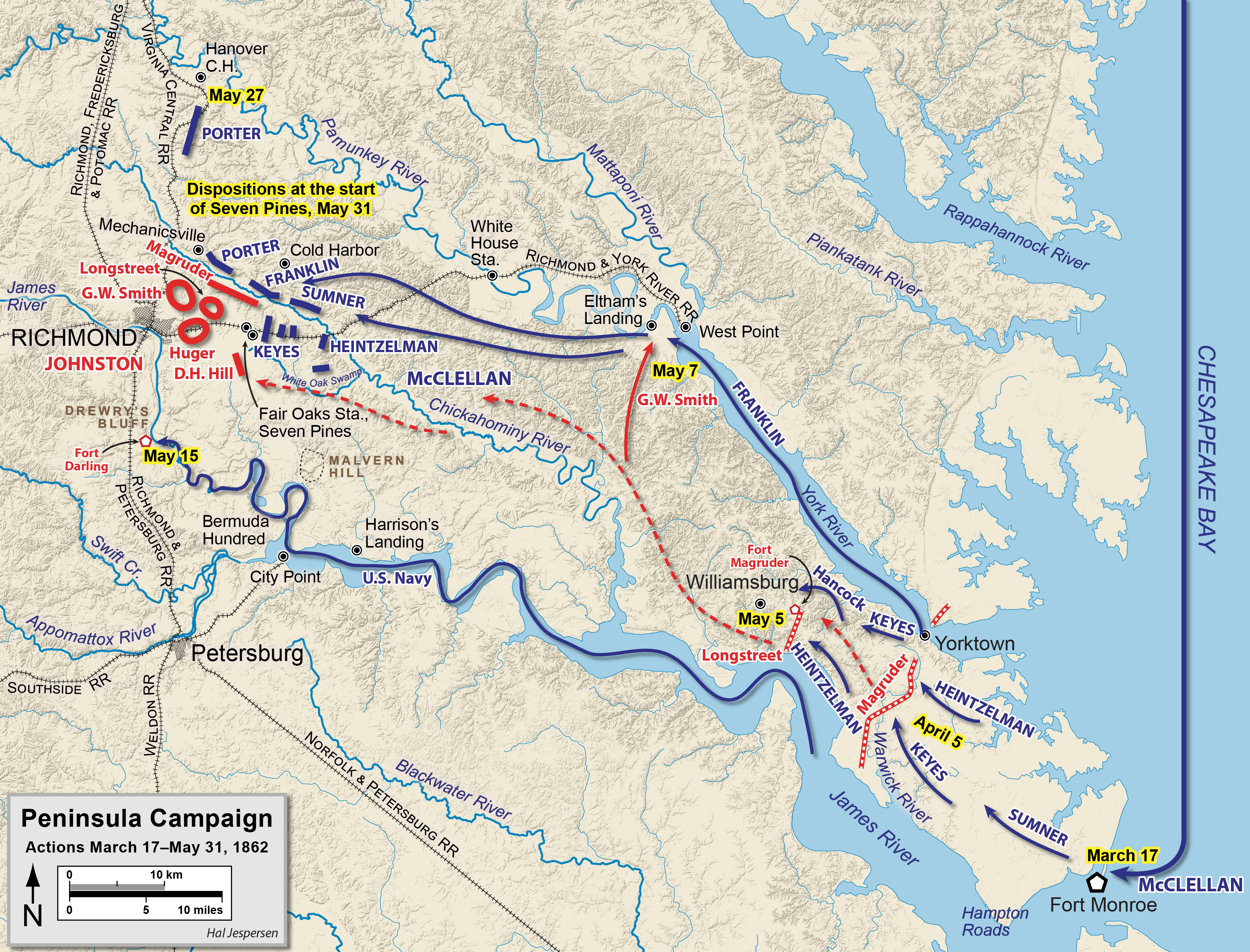
Map of the Peninsula Campaign up to the Battle of Seven Pines Confederate Union

In early April 1862, McClellan, having landed his troops at Fort Monroe at the tip of the Virginia Peninsula, began to move slowly toward Yorktown. Johnston's plan for the defense of the Confederate capital was controversial. Knowing that his army was half the size of McClellan's and that the U.S. Navy could directly support McClellan from either river, Johnston attempted to convince Davis and Lee that the best course would be to concentrate on fortifications around Richmond. He was unsuccessful in persuading them and deployed most of his force on the Peninsula. Following lengthy siege preparations by McClellan at Yorktown, Johnston withdrew and fought a sharp defensive fight at Williamsburg (May 5) and turned back an attempt at an amphibious turning movement at Eltham's Landing (May 7). By late May, the U.S. Army was within six miles (10 km) of Richmond.

Realizing that he could not defend Richmond forever from the U.S. Army's overwhelming numbers and heavy siege artillery and that McClellan's army was divided by the rain-swollen Chickahominy River, Johnston attacked south of the river on May 31 in the Battle of Seven Pines or Fair Oaks. His plan was aggressive but too complicated for his subordinates to execute correctly, and he failed to ensure they understood his orders in detail or to supervise them closely. The battle was tactically inconclusive, but it stopped McClellan's advance on the city and would be the high-water mark of his invasion. More significant, however, was that Johnston was wounded in his shoulder and chest by an artillery shell fragment near the end of the first day of the battle. G.W. Smith commanded the army during the second day of the battle before Davis quickly turned over command to the more aggressive Robert E. Lee, who would lead the Army of Northern Virginia for the rest of the war. Lee began by driving McClellan from the Peninsula during the Seven Days Battles of late June and beating a U.S. army a second time near Bull Run in August.

=== Appointment to the Western Theater and Vicksburg ===
Johnston was prematurely discharged from the hospital on November 24, 1862, and appointed to command the Department of the West, the principal command of the Western Theater, which gave him titular control of Gen. Braxton Bragg's Army of Tennessee and Lt. Gen. John C. Pemberton's Department of Mississippi and East Louisiana. (The other major force in this area was the Trans-Mississippi Department, commanded by Lt. Gen. Theophilus H. Holmes, stationed principally in Arkansas. Johnston argued throughout his tenure that Holmes's command should be combined with Pemberton's under Johnston's control, or at least to reinforce Pemberton with troops from Holmes's command, but he was unable to convince the government to take either of these steps.)

The strategic challenges faced by Joe Johnston in Tennessee and Mississippi during the campaign were multifaceted. Johnston's command was complicated by the presence of a Federal army, which had already taken control of key cities like Nashville, New Orleans, and Memphis. The Confederate forces were spread out, with significant gaps in leadership and resources. Johnston's decision-making was often influenced by his relationship with C.S.A President Davis, who held him responsible for the strategic decisions made during the Vicksburg campaign. Despite Johnston's efforts to maintain a mobile army and coordinate with his subordinates, the strategic problems he faced were complex and required careful planning and execution to succeed.

The first issue facing Johnston in the west was the fate of Braxton Bragg. The Confederate government was displeased with Bragg's performance at the Battle of Stones River, as were many of Bragg's senior subordinates. Jefferson Davis ordered Johnston to visit Bragg and determine whether he should be replaced. Johnston realized that if he recommended Bragg's replacement, he would be the logical choice to succeed him. He considered a field army command more desirable than his current, mostly administrative post. Still, his sense of honor prevented him from achieving this personal gain at Bragg's expense. After interviewing Bragg and several of his subordinates, he produced a generally positive report and refused to relieve the army commander. Davis ordered Bragg to a meeting in Richmond and designated Johnston to take command in the field, but Bragg's wife was ill, and he was unable to travel. Furthermore, in early April, Johnston was forced to bed with lingering problems from his Peninsula wound, and the attention of the Confederates shifted from Tennessee to Mississippi, leaving Bragg in place.

Vicksburg Campaign

The major crisis facing Johnston was defending Confederate control of Vicksburg, Mississippi, which was threatened by U.S. Maj. Gen. Ulysses S. Grant, first in a series of unsuccessful maneuvers during the winter of 1862–63 to the north of the fortress city, but followed in April 1863 with an ambitious campaign that began with Grant's army crossing the Mississippi River southwest of Vicksburg. Catching Lt. Gen. Pemberton by surprise, the U.S. army waged a series of successful battles as it moved northeast toward the state capital of Jackson. On May 9, the Confederate Secretary of War directed Johnston to "proceed at once to Mississippi and take chief command of the forces in the field." Johnston informed Richmond that he was still medically unfit but would obey the order. When he arrived in Jackson on May 13 from Middle Tennessee, he learned that two U.S. Army corps were advancing on the city and that only 6,000 Confederate troops were available to hold it. Johnston ordered a fighting evacuation (the Battle of Jackson, May 14) and retreated with his force north. Grant captured the city and then faced to the west to approach Vicksburg.

Johnston began to move his force west to join Pemberton when he heard of that general's defeat at Champion Hill (May 16) and Big Black River Bridge (May 17). The survivors retreated to the fortifications of Vicksburg. Johnston urged Pemberton to avoid being surrounded by abandoning the city and to join forces with Johnston's troops, outnumbering Grant. Still, Davis had ordered Pemberton to defend the city as his highest priority. Grant launched two unsuccessful assaults against the fortifications and settled in for a siege. The soldiers and civilians in the surrounded city waited in vain for Johnston's small force to rescue them. By late May, Johnston had accumulated about 24,000 men but wanted additional reinforcements before moving forward. He considered ordering Bragg to send these reinforcements but was concerned that this could result in the loss of Tennessee. He also bickered with President Davis about whether the order sending him to Mississippi could be construed as removing him from theater command; historian Steven E. Woodworth judges that Johnston "willfully misconstrued" his orders out of resentment of Davis's interference. Pemberton's army surrendered on July 4, 1863. Along with the capture of Port Hudson a week later, the loss of Vicksburg gave the United States complete control of the Mississippi River and cut the Confederacy in two. President Davis wryly ascribed the strategic defeat to a "want of provisions inside and a general outside [Johnston] who would not fight."

The relationship between Johnston and Davis, difficult since the early days of the war, became bitter as recriminations were traded publicly about who was to blame for Vicksburg. That Johnston never wanted this theater command in the first place, difficulty in effectively moving troops due to lack of direct rail lines and the vast distances involved, lack of assistance from subordinate commanders, Pemberton's refusal to abandon Vicksburg as suggested, and President Davis' habit of communicating directly to Johnston's subordinates (which meant Johnston was often not aware of what was going on) all contributed to this defeat. Davis considered firing Johnston, but he remained a popular officer and had many political allies in Richmond, most notably Sen. Louis Wigfall. Instead, Bragg's army was removed from Johnston's command, leaving him in control of only Alabama and Mississippi.

The President detests Joe Johnston for all the trouble he has given him, and General Joe returns the compliment with compound interest. His hatred of Jeff Davis amounts to a religion. With him it colors all things.

— Diarist Mary Chesnut

While Vicksburg was falling, U.S. Maj. Gen. William S. Rosecrans was advancing against Bragg in Tennessee, forcing him to evacuate Chattanooga. Bragg achieved a significant victory against Rosecrans in the Battle of Chickamauga (September 19–20), but Ulysses S. Grant defeated him in the Battles for Chattanooga in November. Bragg resigned from his command of the Army of Tennessee and returned to Richmond as military adviser to the president. Davis offered the position to William J. Hardee, the senior corps commander, who refused. He considered P.G.T. Beauregard, another general with whom he had poor personal relations, and Robert E. Lee. Lee, reluctant to leave Virginia, first recommended Beauregard, but sensing Davis's discomfort, he changed his recommendation to Johnston. After much agonizing, Davis appointed Johnston to command the Army of Tennessee in Dalton, Georgia, on December 27, 1863.

=== Atlanta Campaign ===
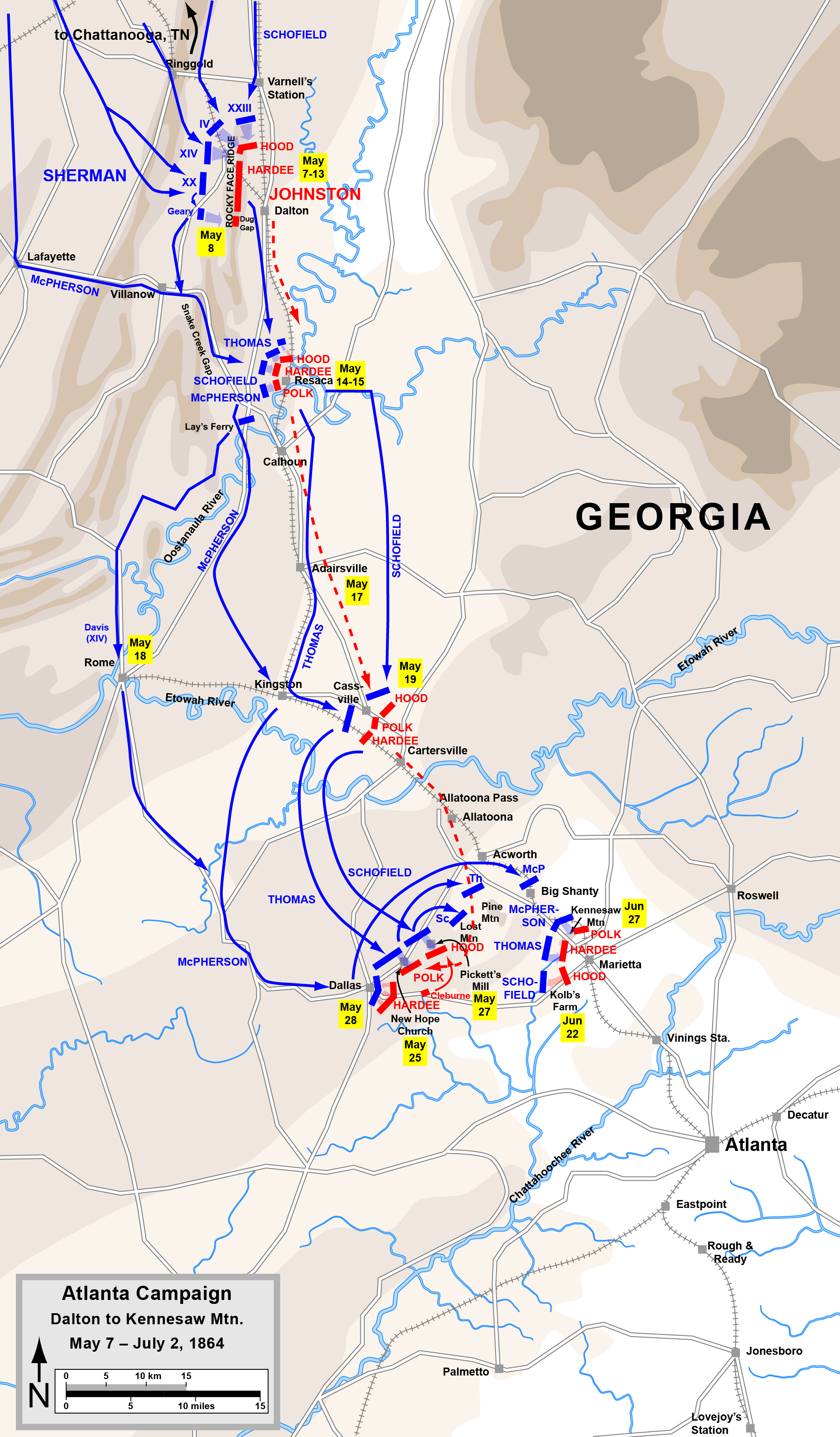
The Atlanta Campaign from Dalton to Kennesaw Mountain

Faced with Maj. Gen. William T. Sherman's advance from Chattanooga to Atlanta in the spring of 1864, Johnston conducted a series of withdrawals that appeared similar to his Peninsula Campaign strategy. He repeatedly prepared strong defensive positions, only to see Sherman maneuver around them in expert turning movements, causing him to fall back in the general direction of Atlanta. Johnston saw the preservation of his army as the most crucial consideration and conducted a very cautious campaign. He handled his army well, slowing the U.S. advance and inflicting heavier losses than he sustained. He pursued a strategy designed to exploit the overextension of Union General William T. Sherman’s forces. Johnston’s plan involved enticing Sherman to move further south from Chattanooga, stretching his supply lines thin, and then using cavalry raids to attack those vulnerable lines, potentially slowing or halting the Union advance. This strategy leveraged maneuver warfare and logistical targeting, reflecting Johnston’s cautious approach to preserve his forces while threatening Union operations. However, Johnston faced significant obstacles. His cavalry forces were too small to create the decisive strikes against Union supply trains that his plan required. The limited numbers meant that even if Sherman advanced as hoped, Johnston could not simultaneously block or harass all critical supply routes. To aggravate the situation, Johnston requested reinforcements from Richmond, but these were denied. One factor contributing to this denial was inaccurate intelligence reports suggesting that the Army of Tennessee was larger and more capable than it actually was, leading Confederate leadership to underestimate the urgency of reinforcing Johnston’s force.

Sherman began his Atlanta campaign on May 4. Johnston's Army of Tennessee fought defensive battles against the Federals at the approaches to Dalton, which was evacuated on May 13, then retreated 12 miles (19 km) south to Resaca and constructed defensive positions. However, after a brief battle, Johnston again yielded to Sherman and retreated from Resaca on May 15. Johnston assembled the Confederate forces for an attack at Cassville. As his troops advanced, an enemy force of unknown strength appeared unexpectedly on his right flank. A skirmish ensued, forcing the corps commander, Lt. Gen. John Bell Hood, to halt his advance and reposition his troops to face the threat. Faced with this unexpected threat, Johnston abandoned his attack and renewed his retreat. On May 20, they again retreated 8 miles (13 km) further south to Cartersville. The month of May 1864 ended with Sherman's forces attempting to move away from their railroad supply line with another turning movement, but became bogged down by the Confederates' fierce defenses at the Battle of New Hope Church on May 25, the Battle of Pickett's Mill on May 27, and the Battle of Dallas on May 28.

In June, Sherman's forces continued maneuvers around the northern approaches to Atlanta. The Battle of Kolb's Farm ensued on June 22, followed by Sherman's first (and only) attempt at a massive frontal assault in the Battle of Kennesaw Mountain on June 27, which Johnston vigorously repulsed. However, U.S. forces were within 17 miles (27 km) of Atlanta by this time, threatening the city from the west and north. Johnston had yielded over 110 miles (177 km) of mountainous, and thus more easily defensible, territory in just two months, while the Confederate government became increasingly frustrated and alarmed. When Johnston retreated across the Chattahoochee River, the final significant barrier before Atlanta, President Davis lost his patience.

In early July, Davis sent Gen. Braxton Bragg to Atlanta to assess the situation. After several meetings with local civilian leaders and Johnston's subordinates, Bragg returned to Richmond and urged President Davis to replace Johnston. Davis removed Johnston from command on July 17, 1864, just outside Atlanta. "The fate of Atlanta, from the Confederate standpoint, was all but decided by Johnston." His replacement, Lt. Gen. Hood, was left with the "virtually impossible situation" of defending Atlanta, which he was forced to abandon in September. Davis's decision to remove Johnston was one of the most controversial of the war.

=== North Carolina and surrender at Bennett Place ===
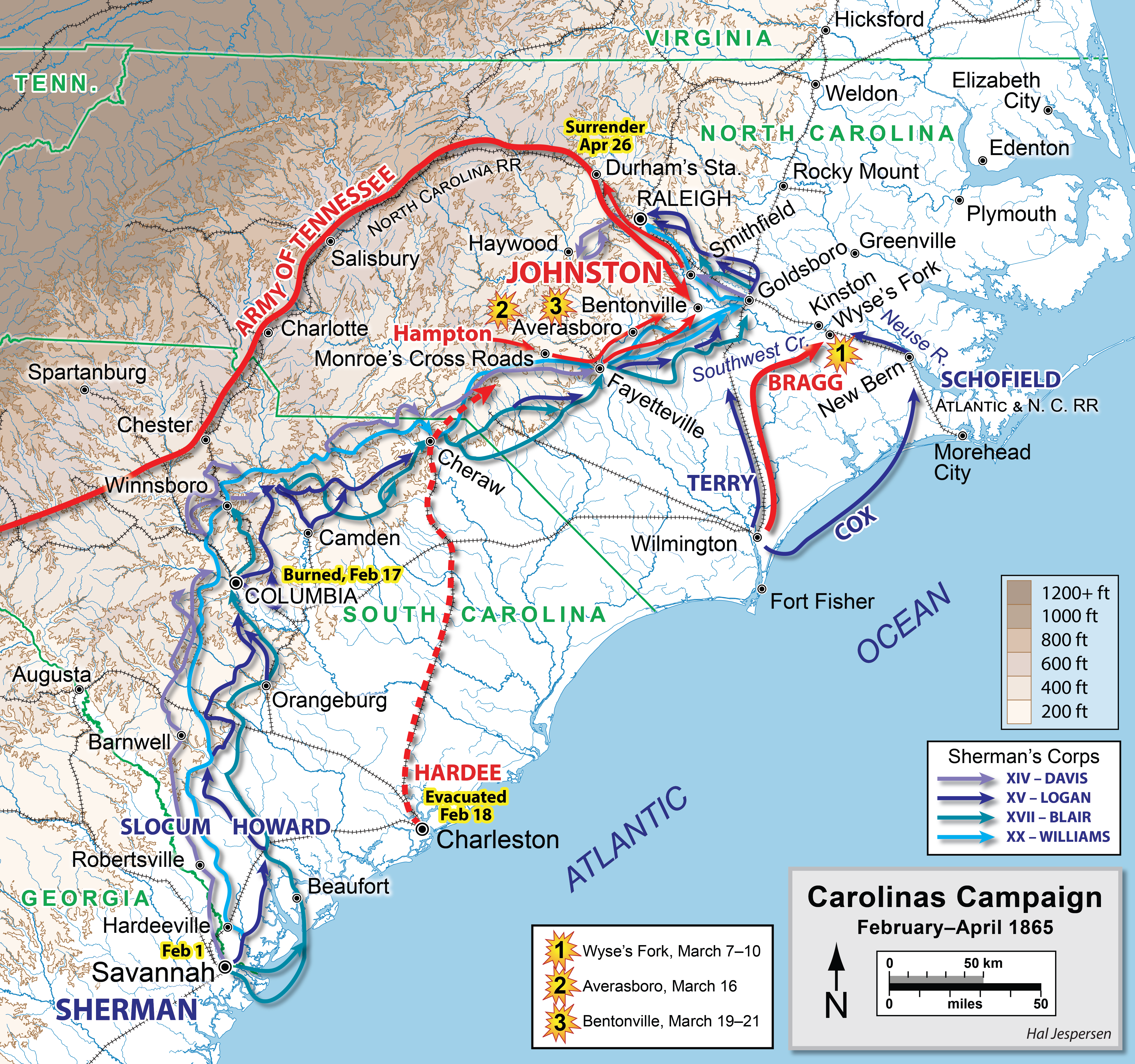
Carolinas campaign

After his relief, Johnston remained near Macon, Georgia, to recover from a stress-induced case of shingles. Between bouts, Johnston wrote his campaign report, which he shared privately with his allies in Richmond. In mid-November 1864, Johnson moved his wife closer to family at Columbia, South Carolina where he lingered in a state of virtual retirement. However, as the Confederacy became increasingly concerned about Sherman's March to the Sea across Georgia and then north through the Carolinas, the public clamored for Johnston's return. The general in charge of the Western Theater, P.G.T. Beauregard, was making little progress against the advancing U.S. force. Political opponents of Jefferson Davis, such as Sen. Louis Wigfall, added to the pressure in Congress. Diarist Mary Chesnut wrote, "We thought this was a struggle for independence. Now it seems it is only a fight between Joe Johnston and Jeff Davis." In January 1865, the Congress passed a law authorizing Robert E. Lee the powers of general in chief, and recommending that Johnston be reinstated as the commander of the Army of Tennessee. Davis immediately appointed Lee to the position, but refused to restore Johnston. In a lengthy unpublished memo, Davis wrote, "My opinion of General Johnston's unfitness for command has ripened slowly and against my inclinations into a conviction so settled that it would be impossible for me again to feel confidence in him as the commander of an army in the field." Vice President Alexander H. Stephens and 17 senators petitioned Lee to use his new authority to appoint Johnston, bypassing Davis, but the general in chief declined. Instead, he recommended the appointment to Davis.

Despite his serious misgivings, Davis restored Johnston to active duty on February 25, 1865. His new command comprised two military departments: the Department of South Carolina, Georgia, and Florida, and the Department of North Carolina and Southern Virginia; he assumed command of the latter department on March 6. These commands included three Confederate field armies, including the remnants of the once-formidable Army of Tennessee, but they were armies in name only. The Tennessee army had been severely depleted at Franklin and Nashville, lacked sufficient supplies and ammunition, and the men had not been paid for months; only about 6,600 traveled to South Carolina. Johnston also had available 12,000 men under William J. Hardee, who had been unsuccessfully attempting to resist Sherman's advance, Braxton Bragg's force in Wilmington, North Carolina, and 6,000 cavalrymen under Wade Hampton.

Johnston, severely outnumbered, hoped to combine his force with a detachment of Robert E. Lee's army from Virginia, jointly defeat Sherman, and then return to Virginia for an attack on Ulysses S. Grant. Lee initially refused to cooperate with this plan. (Following the fall of Richmond in April, Lee attempted to escape to North Carolina to join Johnston, but it was too late.) Recognizing that Sherman was moving quickly, Johnston planned to consolidate his small armies to land a blow against an isolated portion of Sherman's army, advancing in two separate columns. On March 19, 1865, Johnston was able to catch the left wing of Sherman's army by surprise at the Battle of Bentonville and briefly gained some tactical successes before superior numbers forced him to retreat to Raleigh, North Carolina. Unable to secure the capital, Johnston's army withdrew to Greensboro.

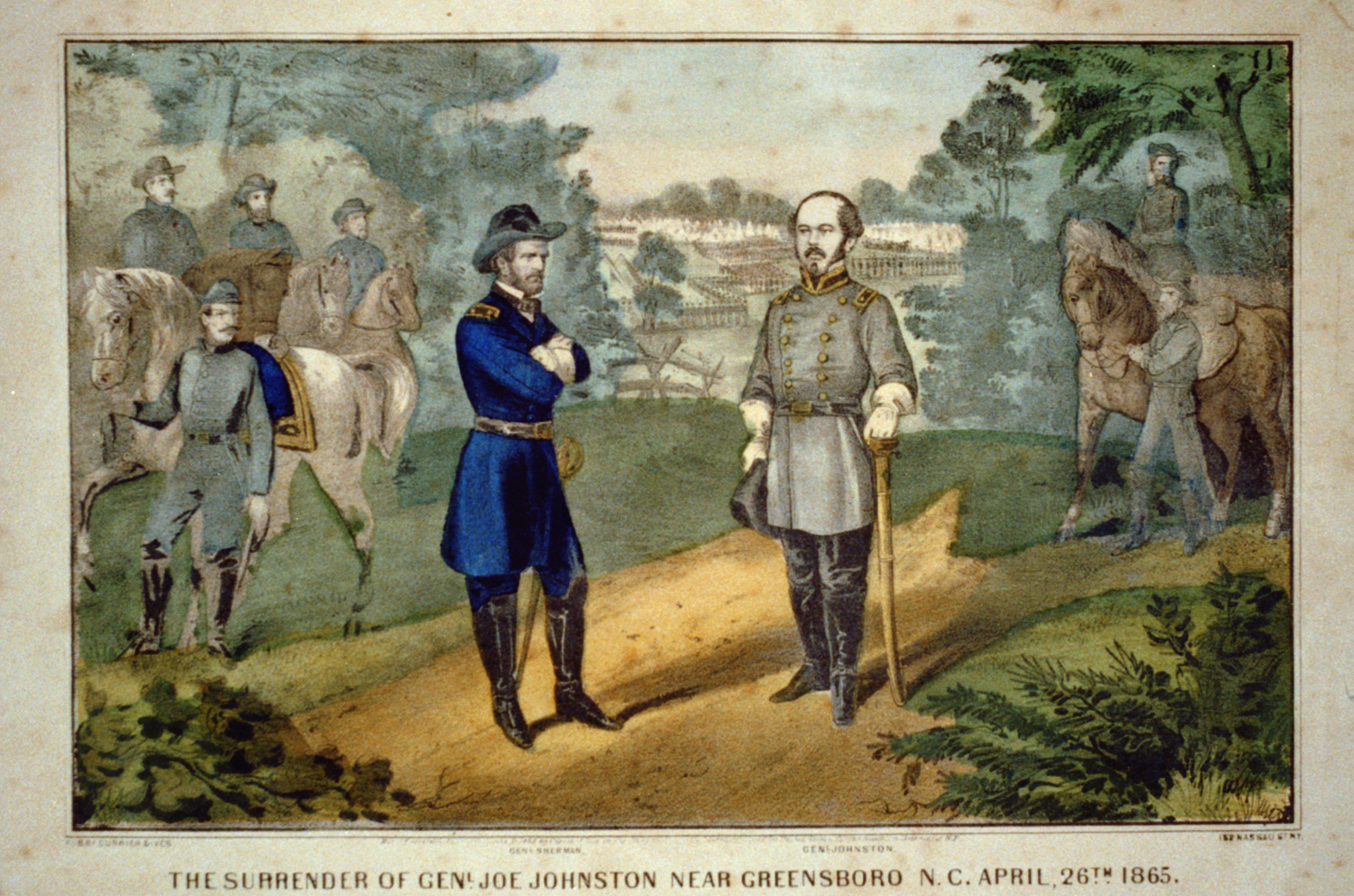
The surrender of Gen. Joe Johnston - Currier & Ives lithograph

After learning of Lee's surrender at Appomattox Court House on April 9, Johnston agreed to meet with General Sherman between the lines at a small farm known as Bennett Place near present-day Durham, North Carolina. After three separate days (April 17, 18, and 26, 1865) of negotiations, Johnston surrendered the Army of Tennessee and all remaining Confederate forces still active in North Carolina, South Carolina, Georgia, and Florida. It was the largest surrender of the war, totaling 89,270 soldiers. President Davis considered that Johnston, surrendering so many troops that had not been explicitly defeated in battle, had committed an act of treason. Johnston was paroled on May 2 at Greensboro.

After the surrender, Sherman issued ten days' rations to the hungry Confederate soldiers as well as horses and mules to "insure a crop." He also ordered the distribution of corn meal and flour to civilians throughout the South. This was an act of generosity that Johnston would never forget; he wrote to Sherman that his attitude "reconciles me to what I have previously regarded as the misfortune of my life, that of having you to encounter in the field."

== Post-war years ==
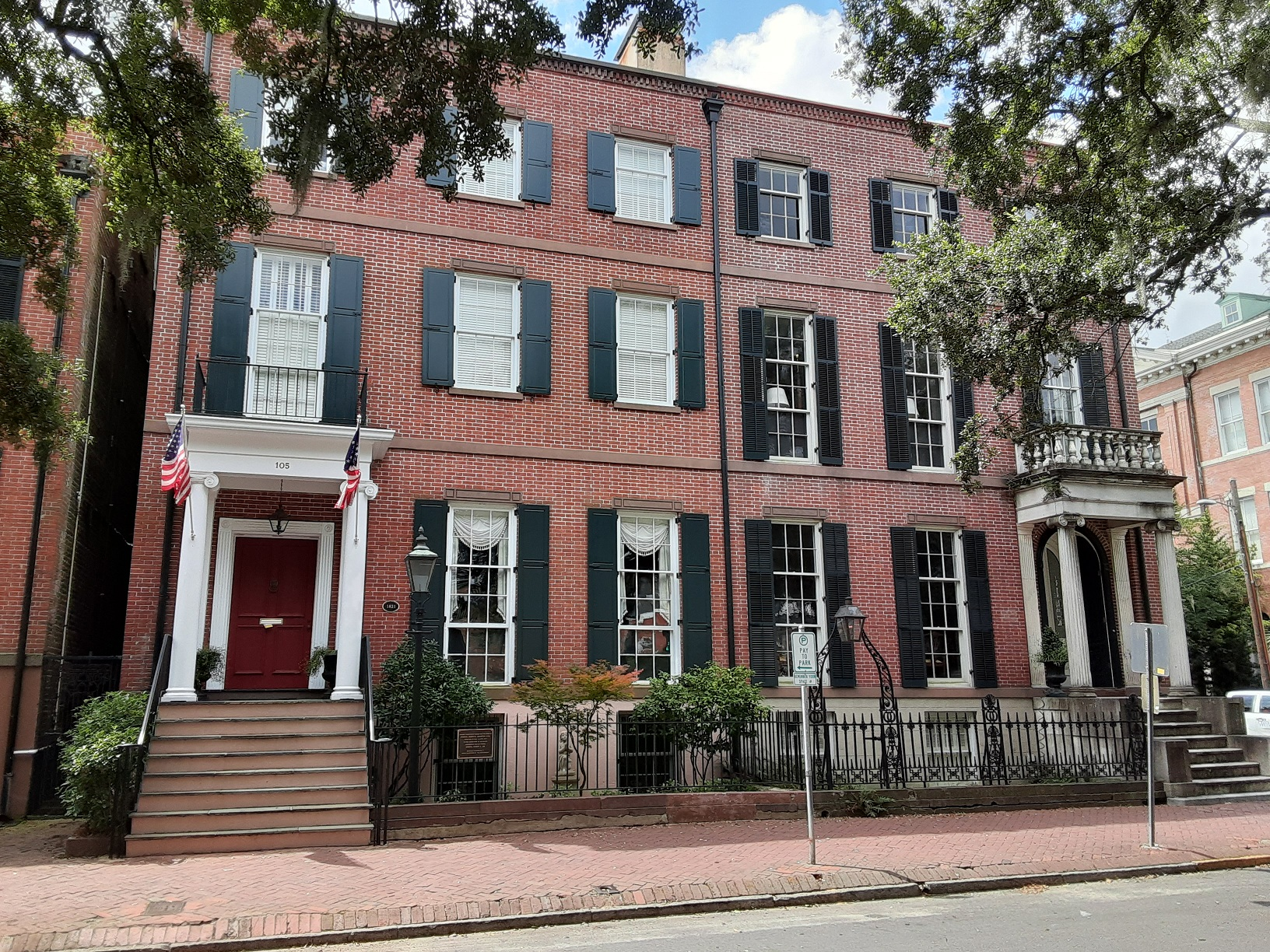
Johnston lived on this lot during his time in Savannah. He was visited by General Robert E. Lee.

Johnston began to make a living for himself and his ailing wife. He became president of a small railroad, the Alabama and Tennessee River Railroad Company, which during his tenure of May 1866 to November 1867, was renamed the Selma, Rome and Dalton Railroad. Johnston was bored with the position, and the company failed for a lack of capital. He established Joseph E. Johnston & Company, an insurance agency for New York Life Insurance Co. and a British insurance company, which Johnston operated out of Savannah (Ga.) from 1868 to 1877. The British company was Liverpool and London and Globe Insurance Company, and within four years had a network of more than 120 agents across the deep South.

The income from this venture allowed him to devote time to his great post-war activity, writing his memoirs, as did several fellow officers. His Narrative of Military Operations (1874) was highly critical of Davis and many of his fellow generals. He repeated his grievance about his ranking as a general in the Confederate Army and attempted to justify his career as a cautious campaigner. The book sold poorly, and its publisher failed to make a profit.

Although many Confederate generals criticized Johnston, Sherman and Grant portrayed him favorably in their memoirs. Sherman described him as a "dangerous and wily opponent" and criticized Johnston's nemeses, Hood and Davis. Grant agreed with his decisions in the Vicksburg Campaign: "Johnston evidently took in the situation, and wisely, I think, abstained from making an assault on us because it would simply have inflicted losses on both sides without accomplishing any result." Commenting on the Atlanta Campaign, Grant wrote,

For my own part, I think that Johnston's tactics were right. Anything that could have prolonged the war a year beyond the time that it finally did close, would probably have exhausted the North to such an extent that they might then have abandoned the contest and agreed to a settlement.

Johnston was a part owner of the Atlantic and Mexican Gulf Canal Company, a canal project approved in 1876. It was intended to construct a canal westward from the St. Marys River in Georgia to connect with the Gulf of Mexico on the coast of Florida.

Johnston moved from Savannah to Richmond in the winter of 1876–77. The former Confederate general was considered for service in President Rutherford B. Hayes's Cabinet, particularly for the post of Secretary of War, but was ultimately not chosen. He served in the 46th Congress from 1879 to 1881 as a Democratic congressman, having been elected with 58.11% of the vote over Greenback candidate William W. Newman. He did not run for reelection in 1880. He was appointed as a commissioner of railroads in the administration of President Grover Cleveland. After his wife died in 1887, Johnston frequently traveled to veterans' gatherings, where he was universally cheered. In September 1890, a few months before he died, he was elected as an honorary member of the District of Columbia Society of the Sons of the American Revolution and was assigned national membership number 1963.

Johnston, like Lee, never forgot the magnanimity of the man to whom he surrendered. He would not allow criticism of Sherman in his presence. Sherman and Johnston corresponded frequently, and they met for friendly dinners in Washington, D.C. whenever Johnston traveled there. When Sherman died, Johnston served as an honorary pallbearer at his funeral. During the procession in New York City on February 19, 1891, he kept his hat off as a sign of respect, although the weather was cold and rainy. Someone concerned for his health asked him to put on his hat, to which Johnston replied, "If I were in his place, and he were standing here in mine, he would not put on his hat." He did catch a cold that day, which developed into pneumonia, and Johnston died one month later in Washington, D.C. He was buried next to his wife in Green Mount Cemetery in Baltimore, Maryland.

== Legacy ==
The historical interpretation Johnston’s use of the Fabian strategy has been controversial. Contemporaries like Jefferson Davis criticized his tendency to retreat and avoid decisive battles, equating caution with inactivity or cowardice. By contrast, historians such as Craig Lee Symonds argue that Johnston’s method was prudent and strategically sound, preserving his army against larger Union forces and often delaying the Union advance more effectively than aggressive tactics would have achieved. Johnston's measured approach allowed the Confederates occasional tactical victories while avoiding the destruction of their remaining forces.

Johnston's papers are held by the Special Collections Research Center at the College of William & Mary.

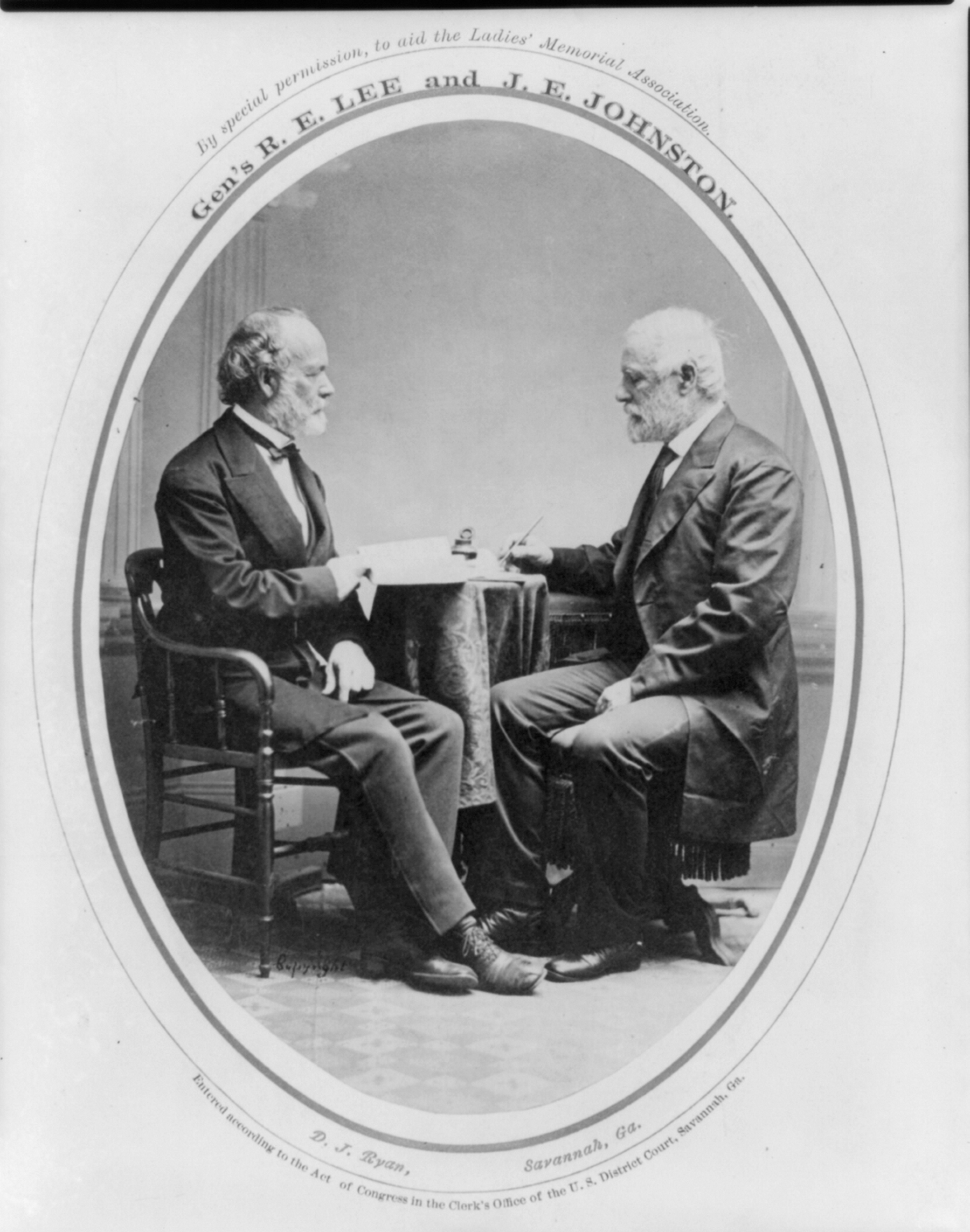
Robert E. Lee and Joseph E. Johnston in 1869–1870

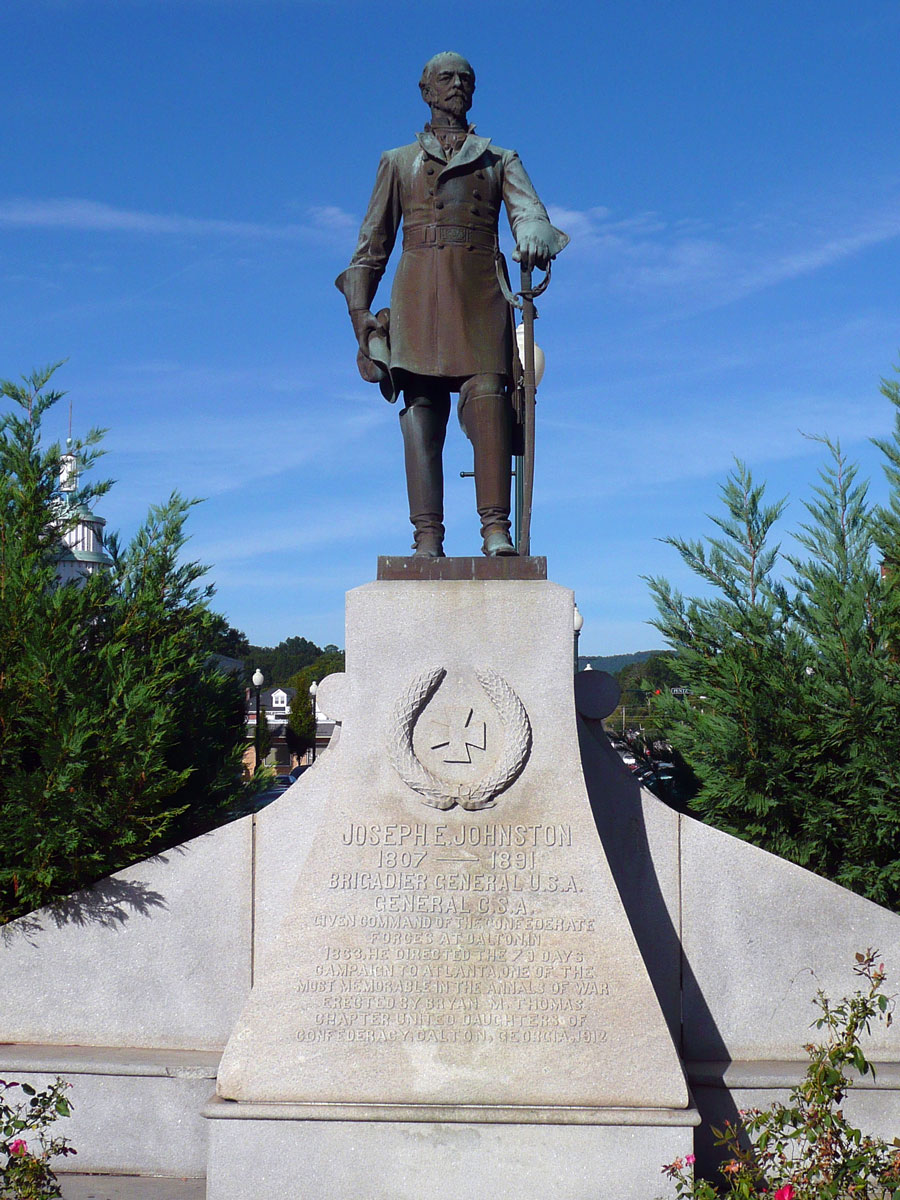
Johnston statue in Dalton, Georgia, where he took command of the Army of Tennessee

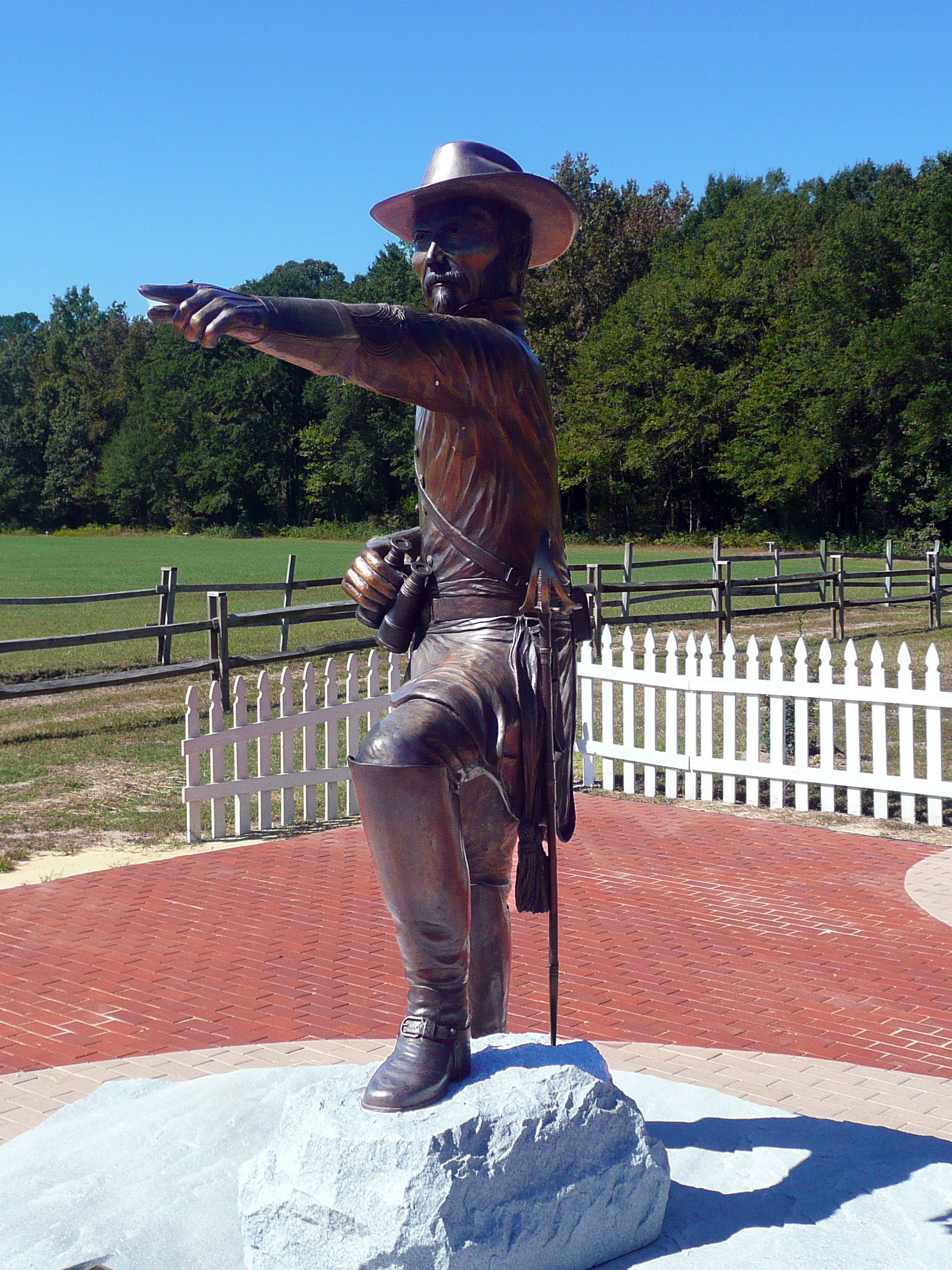
Johnston statue at the location of the Battle of Bentonville, in North Carolina

== Honors ==
- A public monument to Johnston was erected in Dalton, Georgia, in 1912.
- On March 20, 2010, a bronze statue of Johnston was dedicated at the site of the Battle of Bentonville in North Carolina.
- During World War II, the United States Navy named a Liberty Ship (#113) in honor of Johnston.

== See also ==
- List of American Civil War generals (Confederate)

== Notes ==
U.S. House of Representatives
Preceded by Gilbert Carlton Walker	Member of the U.S. House of Representatives from Virginia's 3rd congressional district 1879–1881	Succeeded by George D. Wise
