= James Chesnut Jr. =

American politician (1815–1885)

James Chesnut
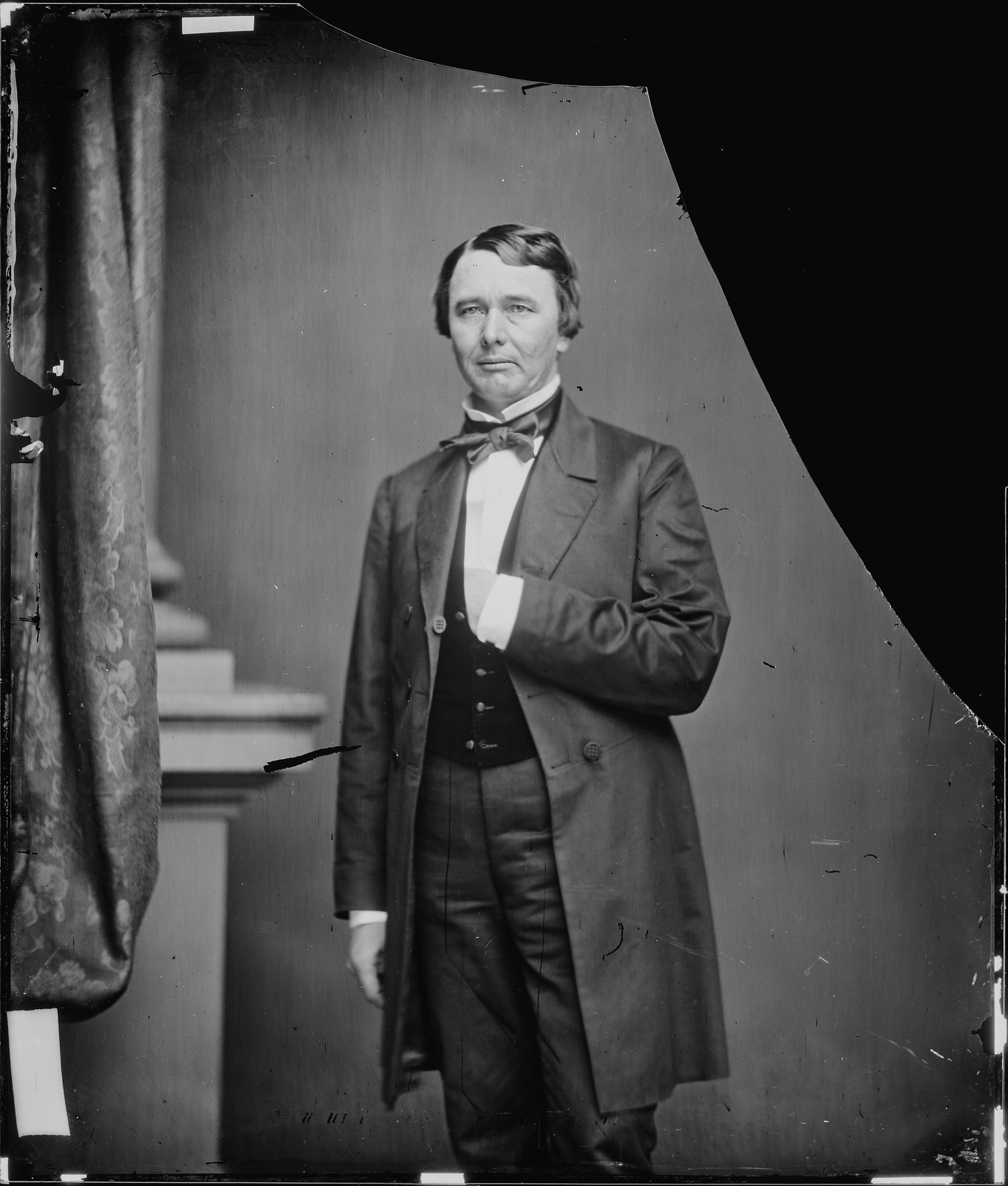

Member of the Provisional Congress of the Confederate States from South Carolina
- In office February 4, 1861 – February 17, 1862
- Preceded by: Constituency established
- Succeeded by: Constituency abolished

United States Senator from South Carolina
- In office December 3, 1858 – November 10, 1860
- Preceded by: Arthur P. Hayne
- Succeeded by: Thomas J. Robertson (1868)

President of the South Carolina Senate
- In office December 10, 1856 – December 3, 1858
- Preceded by: Robert F. W. Allston
- Succeeded by: William Porter

Member of the South Carolina Senate from the Kershaw County district
- In office November 22, 1852 – December 3, 1858

Member of the South Carolina House of Representatives from the Kershaw County district
- In office November 25, 1850 – December 16, 1851
- In office November 23, 1840 – December 15, 1845

Personal details
- Born: January 18, 1815 Camden, South Carolina, U.S.
- Died: February 1, 1885 (aged 70) Camden, South Carolina, U.S.
- Party: Democratic Party
- Other political affiliations: Conservative
- Spouse: Mary Boykin Miller (m. 1840)
- Education: Princeton University (LLB)

Military service
- Allegiance: Confederate States
- Branch/service: Confederate States Army
- Years of service: 1861–1865
- Rank: Brigadier General
- Battles/wars: American Civil War; Battle of Fort Sumter; First Battle of Manassas; Battle of Tulifinny

James Chesnut Jr. (January 18, 1815 – February 1, 1885) was an American lawyer and politician, and a Confederate functionary.

Chesnut, a lawyer prominent in South Carolina state politics, served as a Democratic senator in 1858–60, where he proved moderate on the slavery question. But on Lincoln's election in 1860, Chesnut resigned from the U.S. Senate and took part in the South Carolina secession convention, later helping to draft the Confederate States Constitution. He was Deputy from South Carolina to the Provisional Congress of the Confederate States from 1861 to 1862. He also served as a senior officer of the Confederate States Army in the Eastern Theater of the American Civil War.

As aide to General P.G.T. Beauregard, he ordered the firing on Fort Sumter and served at First Manassas. Later he was aide to Jefferson Davis and promoted to Brigadier-General. Chesnut returned to law practice after the war.

His wife was Mary Boykin Chesnut, whose published diaries reflect the Chesnuts' busy social life and prominent friends such as John Bell Hood, Louis T. Wigfall, Wade Hampton III, and Jefferson Davis.

== Early life and education ==
James Chesnut Jr., was born the youngest of fourteen children and the only (surviving) son of James Chesnut Sr. (1773–1866) and his wife, Mary Cox (1775–1864) on Mulberry Plantation near Camden, South Carolina. Chesnut Sr. was one of the wealthiest planters in the South, who owned 448 slaves and many large plantations totaling nearly five square miles before the outbreak of the Civil War. Chesnut Jr. graduated from the law department of the College of New Jersey (now Princeton University) in 1835, and initially rose to prominence in South Carolina state politics.

== Political career ==
Admitted to the bar in 1837, Chesnut Jr. commenced practice that year in Camden. He was later elected as a member of the South Carolina House of Representatives (1840–52) and the South Carolina Senate (1852–58, serving as its president 1856–58). He was a delegate to the southern convention at Nashville, Tennessee, in 1850.

In 1858 Chesnut was elected by the South Carolina Legislature to the U.S. Senate as a Democrat to replace Josiah J. Evans. He served there for two years alongside Senator James Henry Hammond of South Carolina. Although a defender of slavery and states' rights, Chesnut opposed the re-opening of the African slave trade and was not as staunch a secessionist as most of the South Carolinian politicians. Moderate in his political views, he believed in extending protections for slavery's westward expansion while remaining within the Union.

But the political atmosphere tightened towards the Presidential Election of 1860, since the Republican Party and its presidential candidate, Abraham Lincoln, opposed slavery. After the results of the election were known, Chesnut decided that he could no longer stay in his office in the Senate. Shortly after Lincoln's election, he was the first Southern senator to withdraw from the Senate. He submitted a one-sentence note, stating his resignation, which was read before the South Carolina Senate on November 10, 1860. (He was expelled in absentia from the Senate the next year.)

Chesnut participated in the South Carolina secession convention in December 1860 and was subsequently elected to the Provisional Congress of the Confederate States. He was a member of the committee which drafted the Confederate States Constitution.

Believing that the United States would not resist southern secession, Chesnut famously boasted that he would drink all of the blood which would be spilled in the subsequent Civil War.

== American Civil War ==
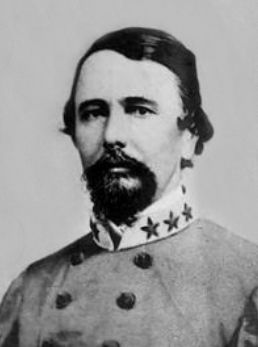
Col. James Chesnut, c. 1862

In the spring of 1861, he served as an aide-de-camp to General P.G.T. Beauregard and was sent by the general to demand the surrender of Fort Sumter in Charleston. After the commander of the fort, Major Robert Anderson of the U.S. Army declined to surrender, Chesnut gave orders to the nearby Fort Johnson to open fire on Fort Sumter. In consequence the first shots of the Civil War were fired, on April 12, 1861. In the summer of 1861 Chesnut also took part in the First Battle of Manassas as an aide-de-camp to Beauregard.

In 1862 Chesnut served on South Carolina's Executive Council. He introduced the motion on January 9 to create administrative departments, of which he became Chief of the Department of the Military of South Carolina. In this position, Chesnut's authority over military affairs superseded that of governor Francis Pickens. On March 5, 1862, he issued a call for recruitment which warned that South Carolina would institute conscription if the state failed to enlist 5,000 volunteers by March 20.

As military department chief, Chesnut oversaw impressment of slaves for South Carolina's war effort. Between March and July, Chesnut authorized the use of impressed slaves for Charleston's defenses and for Colonel Arthur Manigault's use at Winyah Bay. On July 28, 1862, the council approved Chesnut's proposal to implement state-wide impressment which would provide the military with three thousand hands per month for four months.

Chesnut was aware that impressed slaves would be especially vulnerable to malaria while working on defenses in the coastal region. On August 22, 1862 he wrote to the Charleston Mercury that slaveholders had "a real substantial objection" to impressment, in the form of their properties' human needs being neglected, and promised to appoint "an officer of character... to watch over and protect the negroes." However, the Charleston Daily Courier later described the state appointed overseers as even more "raw... unaccustomed" than usual, and "not seem[ing] to care" for slaves' basic needs.

Later in the war he served the Confederate Army as a colonel and an aide to Confederate President Jefferson Davis. In 1864 he was promoted to brigadier general and given command of South Carolina reserve forces until the end of the war. He was third in command of the confederate forces at the Battle of Tulifinny. He was in overall command before the arrival of Maj. Gen. Samuel Jones and later Brig. Gen. Lucius Gartrell. After the war, he returned to the practice of law in Camden and formed the Conservative Party.

== Personal life ==
Although James Chesnut Jr. was the only son, his father had given him little of his extensive property. Because his father lived to the age of 90 and gave his son but a small allowance, the son James had to live mainly on his law practice. The Chesnut fortune declined in the course of the war and thus, after his father died in 1866, Chesnut inherited little more than the extensive debts that encumbered the Mulberry and Sandy Hill plantations.

Chesnut married seventeen-year-old Mary Boykin Miller (1823–86), on April 23, 1840. She later became well known for her book on life during the Civil War, published as a diary but revised extensively from 1881 to 1886. The daughter of U.S. Senator Stephen Decatur Miller (1788–1838) and Mary Boykin (1804–85), she was well-educated and intelligent and took part in her husband's career. The Chesnuts' marriage was at times stormy due to difference in temperament (she was hot-tempered and passionate and came occasionally to regard her husband as cool and reserved). Their companionship was mostly warm and affectionate but they had no children. The couple resided at Chesnut Cottage in Columbia during the Civil War period.

As Mary Chesnut described in depth in her diary, the Chesnuts had a wide circle of friends and acquaintances in the society of the South and the Confederacy. Among their friends were, for example, Confederate general John Bell Hood, ex-Governor John L. Manning, Confederate general and politician John S. Preston and his wife Caroline, Confederate general and politician Wade Hampton III, Confederate politician Clement C. Clay and his wife Virginia, and Confederate general and politician Louis T. Wigfall and his wife Charlotte. The Chesnuts were intimate family friends of President Jefferson Davis and his wife Varina Howell. James Chesnut was also a first cousin of fellow Confederate general Zachariah C. Deas.

== Death ==
James Chesnut was "regarded as an amiable, modest gentleman of decent parts [gifts]", who performed his duties with ability and dignity both in political and military life. He died at home in Camden in 1885; interment was in Chesnut Family Cemetery, Kershaw County, South Carolina.

== See also ==
- List of American Civil War generals (Confederate)
- List of United States senators expelled or censured
- Johnson Chesnut Whittaker (1858–1931), born on the Chestnut plantation, one of the first black men to win an appointment to the United States Military Academy at West Point

== Works cited ==
- McPherson, James (1988). Battle Cry of Freedom. Oxford University Press. ISBN 9780195038637.

Political offices
| Preceded by Robert F. W. Allston | President of the South Carolina Senate; 1856–1858 | Succeeded by William Porter |
U.S. Senate
| Preceded by Arthur P. Hayne | U.S. Senator (Class 3) from South Carolina; 1858–1860; Served alongside: James Hammond | Vacant Title next held by Thomas J. Robertson; 1868 |
Confederate States House of Representatives
| New constituency | Member of the Provisional Congress of the Confederate States from South Carolina; 1861–1862 | Constituency abolished |
