= Myrta Lockett Avary =

American white supremacist, author, and journalist

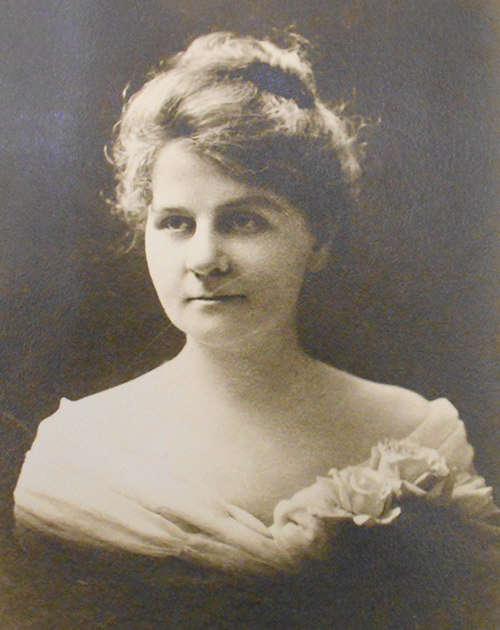
- Born: Myrta Lockett; December 7, 1857; Halifax County, Virginia, U.S.
- Died: February 14, 1946 (aged 88); Atlanta, Georgia, U.S.
- Resting place: Oakland Cemetery, Atlanta, Georgia, U.S.
- Occupations: Writer, editor
- Spouse: James Corbin Avary
- Writing career
- Notable work: Dixie After the War

Myrta Lockett Avary (December 7, 1857 – February 14, 1946) was an American writer and journalist. Her books include Dixie After the War (1906), The Recollections of Alexander H. Stephens (1910) and Uncle Remus and the Wren's Nest (1913). She died on February 14, 1946, in Atlanta.

== Life ==
Myrta Lockett was born in Halifax County, Virginia on December 7, 1857. She was born to Harwood and Augusta Lockett. She married Georgian physician James Corbin Avary in 1884 and moved to Atlanta, Georgia. They had a son who died in infancy.

In Atlanta, Avary wrote for multiple publications, including the Atlanta Journal, Atlanta Constitution, and Atlanta Georgian. In 1880, she moved with Dr. Avary to New York and they separated in 1911. Avary wrote for more publications there, such as the Christian Herald.

In 1908, she returned to Atlanta, and continued working in journalism. She died on February 14, 1946, in Atlanta.

Avary was engaged in charity work at home, but also in India, China, and Cuba.

== Avary's works ==
Avary is the author of the book A Virginia Girl in the Civil War, published in 1903.

She was also one of the editors for Mary Boykin Chesnut's Diary From Dixie (1905).

In 1906, Avary published Dixie After the War, a history of the Reconstruction era. In this book she writes that the effect of the abolition of slavery had been that "the negro, en masse, relapsed promptly into the voodooism of Africa. Emotional extravaganzas, which for the sake of his health and sanity, if for nothing else, had been held in check by his owners, were indulged without restraint." She glorified lynchings and the terror of the Ku Klux Klan and – along with other authors like Thomas Dixon Jr. – "deformed the reality of the white counterrevolution during Reconstruction".

Four years later, in 1910, the next work that Avary published was The Recollections of Alexander H. Stephens. Stephens had been the Vice President of the Confederate States of America and, while in Union custody, he kept a journal, which Avary would later publish.

Myrta Lockett Avary's final work was Uncle Remus and the Wren's Nest, of Joel Chandler Harris and his Home in 1913.

== Descendants ==
Academy Award-winning film writer, producer, and director Roger Avary is a descendant of Myrta Lockett Avary.
