= Chesnut Cottage =

Historic house in South Carolina, United States

- U.S. National Register of Historic Places
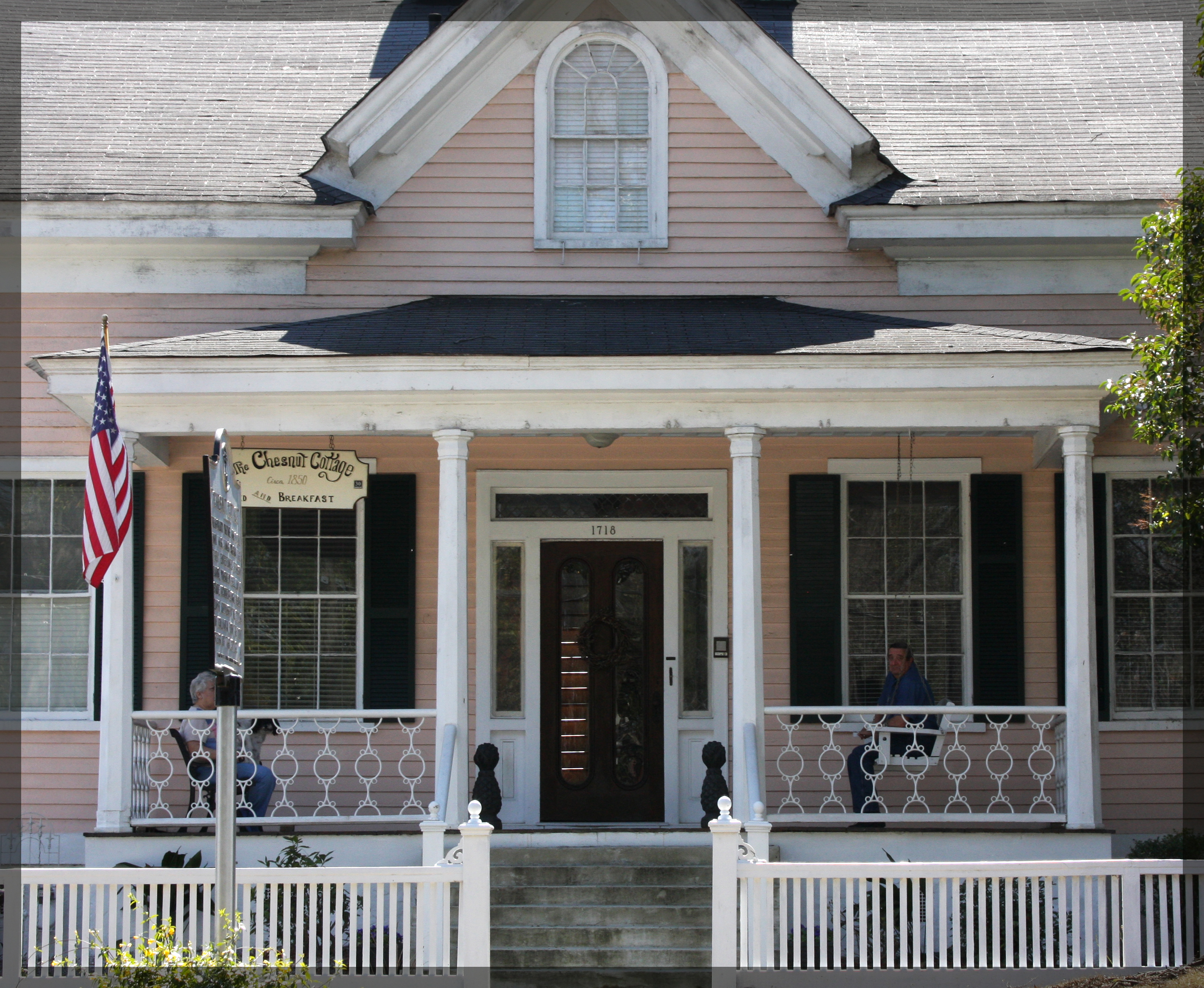

- Location within South Carolina Location within the United States
- Location: 1718 Hampton St., Columbia, South Carolina
- Coordinates: 34°0′27″N 81°1′37″W
- Area: 0.3 acres (0.12 ha)
- Built: c. 1855-1860
- Architectural style: Classical Revival, Columbia Cottage
- NRHP reference No.: 71000797
- Added to NRHP: May 6, 1971

Chesnut Cottage is a historic home located at Columbia, South Carolina. It was built between 1855 and 1860, and is a 1 1/2-story, Classical Revival style frame house, with a central dormer with an arched window. It features projecting front portico with octagonal columns and ironwork and wood balustrade. It was the home of General James Chesnut, Jr. and Mary Boykin Chesnut during the American Civil War period. In the fall of 1864, President Jefferson Davis was entertained at the home and made a speech from the front steps of the portico.

It was added to the National Register of Historic Places in 1971.
