= Preston C. Lorick House =

Historic house in South Carolina, United States

- U.S. National Register of Historic Places
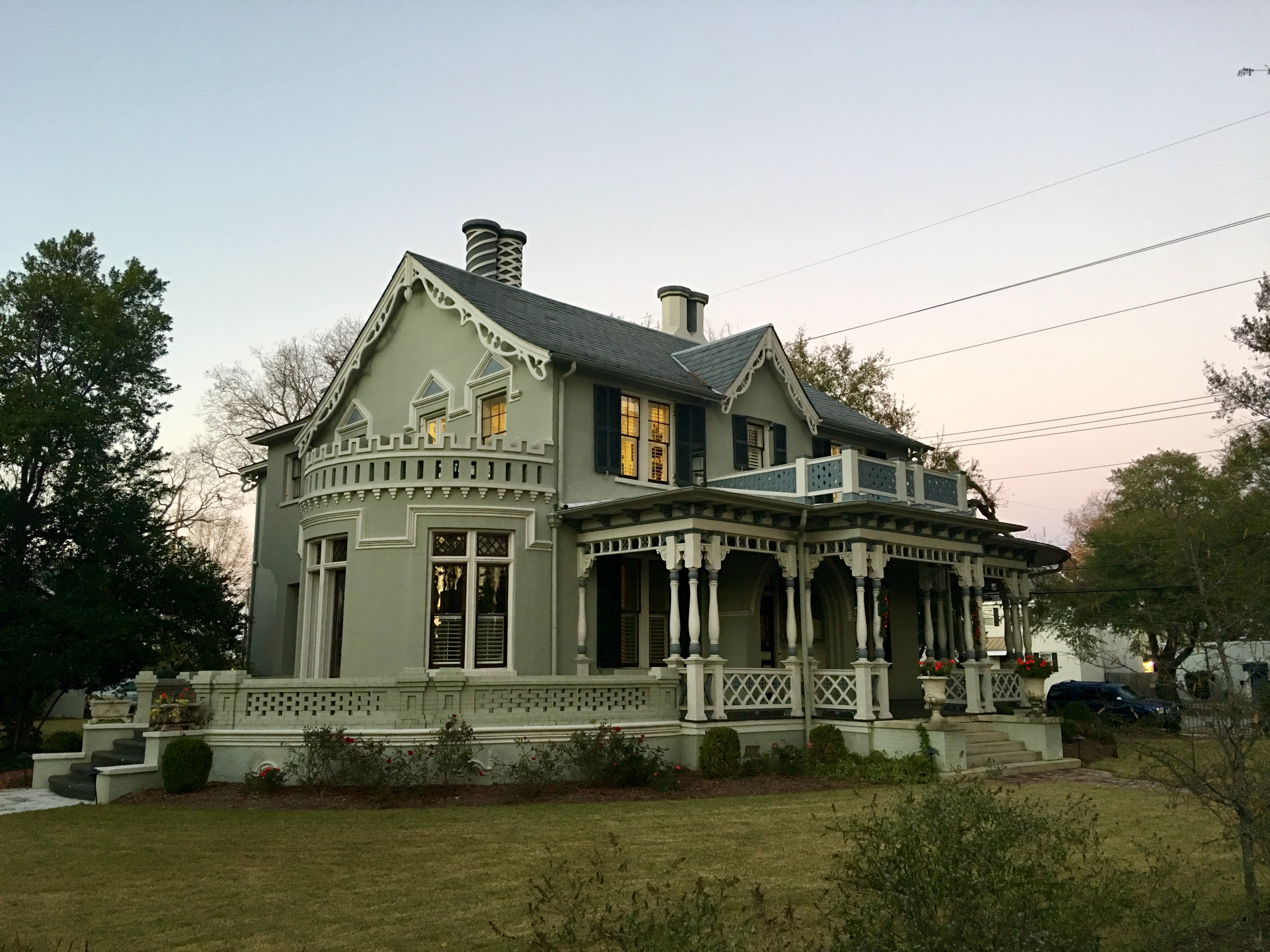

- Location within South Carolina Location within the United States
- Location: 1727 Hampton St., Columbia, South Carolina
- Coordinates: 34°0′29″N 81°1′35″W
- Area: 1 acre (0.40 ha)
- Built: 1854
- Architectural style: Late Victorian
- NRHP reference No.: 72001219
- Added to NRHP: February 23, 1972

Preston C. Lorick House, also known as the Lorick-Baker House, is a historic home located at Columbia, South Carolina. It was built before 1840, and remodeled in the late 1800s in the Late Victorian style. It is a two-story, frame dwelling, with a wraparound portico. The house features decorative brackets under all eaves and gingerbread woodwork. It was the home of Governor John Lawrence Manning during his term of office from 1852 to 1854.

It was added to the National Register of Historic Places in 1972.
