= Mary Chesnut's Civil War =

1981 annotated collection of the diaries of Mary Boykin Chesnut

- Author: Mary Boykin Chesnut, annotations by C. Vann Woodward
- Genre: history
- Publisher: Yale University Press
- Publication date: 1981
- Publication place: United States
- Pages: 892
- Awards: Pulitzer Prize for History
- ISBN: 978-0300029796

Mary Chesnut's Civil War is an annotated collection of the diaries of Mary Boykin Chesnut, an upper-class planter who lived in South Carolina during the American Civil War. The diaries were extensively annotated by historian C. Vann Woodward and published by Yale University Press in 1981. For his work on the book, Woodward was awarded the 1982 Pulitzer Prize for History.
