= Mary Boykin Chesnut =

American Confederacy Civil War diarist (1823–1886)

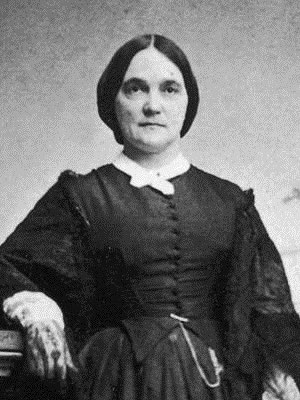
- Chesnut in the 1860s
- Born: Mary Boykin Miller; March 31, 1823 near Stateburg, South Carolina, US
- Died: November 22, 1886 (aged 63); Camden, South Carolina, US
- Known for: Civil War diaries
- Spouse: James Chesnut Jr.

Mary Boykin Chesnut (née Miller; March 31, 1823 – November 22, 1886) was an American writer noted for a book published as her Civil War diary, a "vivid picture of a society in the throes of its life-and-death struggle." She described the war from within her upper-class circles of Southern planter society, but encompassed all classes in her book. She was married to James Chesnut Jr., a lawyer who served as a United States senator and officer in the Confederate States Army.

Chesnut worked toward a final form of her book in 1881–1884, based on her extensive diary written during the war years. It was published in 1905, 19 years after her death. New versions were published after her papers were discovered, in 1949 by the novelist Ben Ames Williams, and in 1981 by the historian C. Vann Woodward. Woodward's annotated edition of the diary, Mary Chesnut's Civil War (1981), won the Pulitzer Prize for History in 1982. Literary critics have praised Chesnut's diary—the influential writer Edmund Wilson termed it "a work of art" and a "masterpiece" of the genre — as the most important work by a Confederate author.

== Life ==
Mary Chesnut was born on March 31, 1823, on her maternal grandparents' plantation, called Mount Pleasant, near Stateburg, South Carolina, in the High Hills of Santee. Her parents were Stephen Decatur Miller (1788–1838), who had served as a U.S. Representative, and Mary Boykin (1804–85). In 1829 her father was elected Governor of South Carolina and in 1831 as a U.S. senator. The family then lived in Charleston. Mary was the oldest of four children; she had a younger brother Stephen and two sisters: Catherine and Sarah Amelia.

At the age of 13, Miller began her formal education in Charleston, South Carolina, where she boarded at Madame Talvande's French School for Young Ladies, which attracted daughters from the élite of the slaveowner class. Talvande was among the many French colonial refugees who had settled in Charleston from Saint-Domingue (Haiti) after the Haitian Revolution. Miller became fluent in French and German, and received a strong education.

Leaving politics, her father took his family to Mississippi, where he bought extensive acreage. It was a crude, rough frontier compared to Charleston. He owned three cotton plantations and hundreds of slaves. Mary lived in Mississippi for short periods between school terms but was reportedly more fond of the city.

== Marriage ==
In 1836, while in Charleston, 13-year-old Mary Boykin Miller met her future husband, James Chesnut, Jr. (1815–85), who was eight years her senior. At the age of 17, she married him on April 23, 1840. They first lived with his parents and sisters at Mulberry, their plantation near Camden, South Carolina. His father, James Chesnut, Sr. (to whom Mary referred throughout her diaries as the "Old Colonel"), had gradually purchased and reunited the land holdings of his father John. He was said to have owned about five square miles at the maximum and to hold about 500 slaves by 1849.

In 1858, by then an established lawyer and politician, James Chesnut, Jr. was elected a U.S. senator from South Carolina, a position he held until South Carolina's secession from the United States in December 1860, shortly following the election of Abraham Lincoln. Once the Civil War began, Chesnut became an aide to President Jefferson Davis and was commissioned a brigadier general in the Confederate Army. The couple resided at Chesnut Cottage in Columbia during the Civil War period.

Intelligent and witty, Mary Chesnut took part in her husband's career, as entertaining was an important part of building political networks. She had her best times when they were in the capitals of Washington, D.C., and Richmond. She suffered from depression, in part because of her inability to have children, and she occasionally took opium. The Chesnuts' marriage was at times stormy owing to their differences in temperament (she was more hot-tempered and sometimes considered her husband reserved), but their companionship was mostly warm and affectionate.

As Mary Chesnut describes in her diary, the Chesnuts had a wide circle of friends and acquaintances in the upper society of the South and government of the Confederacy. Among them were, for example, Confederate general John Bell Hood, politician John L. Manning, general and politician John S. Preston and his wife Caroline, general and politician Wade Hampton III, politician Clement C. Clay and his wife Virginia Clay-Clopton, and general and politician Louis T. Wigfall and his wife Charlotte (also known as Louise). The Chesnuts were also family friends of Confederate President Jefferson Davis and his wife Varina Howell.

Also among these circles were Sara Agnes Rice Pryor and her husband Roger, a Congressman. Sara Pryor, Virginia Clay-Clopton and Louise Wigfall Wright wrote memoirs of the war years, which were published in the early 20th century; their three works were particularly recommended by the United Daughters of the Confederacy to their large membership.

Like many slaveowners, the Chesnuts faced financial difficulties after the war. They lost 1,000 slaves as property through emancipation. James Chesnut, Sr. died in 1866; his will left his son the use of Mulberry Plantation and Sandy Hill, both of which were encumbered by debt, and 83 slaves by name, who were by then freedmen. The younger Chesnut struggled to build the plantations and support his father's dependents.

By his father's will, James Chesnut, Jr. had the use of Mulberry and Sandy Hill plantations only during his lifetime. In February 1885, both he and Mary's mother died. The plantations passed on to a male Chesnut descendant, and Mary Boykin Chesnut received almost no income. She also found her husband had many debts related to the estate which he had been unable to clear. She struggled in her last year, dying in 1886 at her home Sarsfield in Camden, South Carolina. She was buried next to her husband in Knights Hill Cemetery in Camden, South Carolina.

== Writing and the diary ==
Mary Boykin Chesnut began her diary on February 18, 1861, and ended it on June 26, 1865. She would write at the outset: "This journal is intended to be entirely objective. My subjective days are over." Chesnut was an eyewitness to many historic events as she accompanied her husband to significant sites of the American Civil War. Among them were Montgomery, Alabama, and Richmond, Virginia, where the Provisional Congress of the Confederate States of America convened; Charleston, where she was among witnesses of the first shots of the Civil War; Columbia, South Carolina, where her husband served as the Chief of the Department of the Military of South Carolina and brigadier general in command of South Carolina reserve forces; and again Richmond, where her husband served as an aide to the president. At times, they also lived with his parents at their house at Mulberry Plantation near Camden. While the property was relatively isolated in thousands of acres of plantation and woodland, they entertained many visitors.

Chesnut was aware of the historical importance of what she witnessed. The diary was filled with the cycle of changing fortunes of the South during the Civil War. Chesnut edited the diary, wrote new drafts in 1881–1884 for publication, and retained the sense of events unfolding without foreknowledge. She had the sense of the South's living through its time on a world stage, and she captured the growing difficulties of all classes of the Confederacy as they faced defeat at the end of the war. Chesnut analyzed and portrayed the various classes of the South throughout the war, providing a detailed view of Southern society and especially of the mixed roles of men and women. She was forthright about the complex and fraught situations related to slavery, particularly the abuses of women's sexuality and the power exercised by white men. For instance, Chesnut discussed the problem of white slaveowners' fathering mixed-race children with enslaved women within their extended households.

The mulattos one sees in every family ... resemble the white children. Any lady is ready to tell you who is the father of all the mulatto children in everybody's household but her own. Those, she seems to think, drop from the clouds.

Examination of Mary Chesnut's papers has revealed the history of her development as a writer and of her work on the diary as a book. Before working to revise her diary as a book in the 1880s, Chesnut wrote a translation of French poetry, essays, and a family history. She also wrote three full novels that she never published: The Captain and the Colonel, completed about 1875; and Two Years of My Life, finished about the same time. She finished most of a draft of a third long novel, called Manassas. Elisabeth Muhlenfeld, who edited the first two novels for publication by the University of Virginia Press in 2002 and wrote a biography of Chesnut, described them as her writing "apprenticeship."

Chesnut used her diary and notes to work toward a final version in 1881–1884. Based on her drafts, historians do not believe she was finished with her work. Because Chesnut had no children, before her death she gave her diary to her closest friend, Isabella D. Martin, and urged her to have it published. The diary was first published in 1905 as a heavily edited and abridged edition. Williams' 1949 version was described as more readable, but sacrificing historical reliability and many of Chesnut's literary references.

=== Publication history ===
- 1905: A Diary From Dixie. Mary Boykin Miller Chesnut, 1823-1886, ed. by Isabella D. Martin and Myrta Lockett Avary. New York: D. Appleton and Company 1905, available online as a part of the UNC-CH database "Documenting the American South."
- 1949: A Diary from Dixie, an expanded version edited by the novelist Ben Ames Williams to enhance its readability and annotated. Reissued in 1980 by Harvard University Press, with a foreword by Edmund Wilson, originally published in 1962 as an essay on Chesnut.
- 1981: Mary Chesnut's Civil War, edited and with an introduction by C. Vann Woodward. Reprinted in 1993 and available in preview online.
- 2002, Mary Chesnut, Two Novels, includes The Colonel and the Captain; and Two Years - or The Way We Lived Then, edited and Introduction by Elisabeth Muhlenfeld, University of Virginia Press.
- 2011: Mary Chesnut's Diary, with an introduction by Catherine Clinton, Penguin Classic edition.

== Reception and legacy ==
Chesnut's reputation rests on the fact that she created literature while keeping the sense of events unfolding; she described people in penetrating and enlivening terms and conveyed a novelistic sense of events through a "mixture of reportage, memoir and social criticism". Critic and writer Edmund Wilson summarized her achievement:

The very rhythm of her opening pages at once puts us under the spell of a writer who is not merely jotting down her days but establishing, as a novelist does, an atmosphere, an emotional tone...Starting out with situations or relationships of which she cannot know the outcome, she takes advantage of the actual turn of events to develop them and round them out as if she were molding a novel.

Chesnut has had some detractors, notably history professor Kenneth S. Lynn, of Johns Hopkins University. He described her work as a "hoax" and a "fabrication" in a 1981 New York Times review of Woodward's edition of the diaries. Lynn argues that the diary was "composed", rather than simply rewritten, in the 1881-84 period, emphasizing that Chesnut both omitted a great deal from the original diaries and added much new material: "She dwelt upon the personalities of people to whom she had previously referred only briefly, plucked a host of bygone conversations from her memory and interjected numerous authorial reflections on historical and personal events."

Because neither Chesnut nor her later editors conceded that she had heavily revised her work, Lynn's view that the whole project is a fraud is a minority one. In 1982, Woodward's edition of Chesnut's diary won a Pulitzer Prize. A few years later, Ken Burns used extensive readings from Chesnut's diary in his documentary television series The Civil War. Actress Julie Harris read these sections.

In 2000, Mulberry Plantation, the house of James and Mary Boykin Chesnut in Camden, South Carolina, was designated a National Historic Landmark, due to its importance to America's national heritage and literature. The plantation and its buildings are representative of James and Mary Chesnut's elite slaveowner class.
