= South Carolina Highway 441 =

Highway in South Carolina, US

South Carolina Highway 441

Route information
- Maintained by SCDOT
- Length: 26.280 mi (42.294 km)

Major junctions
- South end: SC 763 in Millwood
- US 76 / US 378 near Stateburg; US 521 in Dalzell
- North end: US 15 near Ashwood

Location
- Country: United States
- State: South Carolina
- Counties: Sumter, Lee

Highway system
- South Carolina State Highway System; Interstate; US; State; Scenic
← SC 430	→ SC 453

South Carolina Highway 441 (SC 441) is a 26.280-mile-long (42.294 km) state highway in the U.S. state of South Carolina. The highway connects the Sumter area in Sumter County with rural areas of Lee County.

== Route description ==
SC 441 begins at an intersection with SC 763 (Wedgefield Road) in Millwood, Sumter County, where the roadway continues as Lynam Road. This intersection is northwest of Millwood Elementary School. It travels to the north and immediately curves to the northwest before leaving the Millwood vicinity. The highway immediately travels through Sumter for approximately 60 feet (18 m) before re-entering Millwood. When it crosses over Green Swamp, it leaves Millwood a second time. It immediately travels along the southwestern edge of the city limits of Sumter before entering Sumter proper. The highway turns left onto Patriot Parkway, which is northeast of Patriot Park. The highway travels to the west and leaves Sumter. SC 441 curves to the west-northwest and crosses some railroad tracks. It curves to the north-northwest and intersects U.S. Route 76 (US 76) and US 378 just southwest of Shaw Air Force Base.

It curves to the north and north-northwest before traveling through a small portion of the base, with most turn-offs blocked by fences and/or jersey barriers. The highway travels along the northwestern edge of the base and then along the eastern edge of Oakland. It passes by Oakland Primary School before leaving Oakland and curving to the north-northwest. SC 441 travels through Catchall before it curves to the northeast. It travels along the northwestern edge of Dalzell and has an interchange with US 521 (Thomas Sumter Highway). Immediately after the interchange, it passes Thomas Sumter Academy. It travels through rural areas of the county before it intersects Dubose Siding Road at Stanyarne Burrows Crossroad. Just after that, it enters Lee County. The highway crosses over Rocky Bluff Swamp before traveling through Woodrow. Then, it crosses over Cowpen Swamp and McGirts Creek before intersecting Red Hill Road in Hammetts Crossroads. A short distance later, it meets its northern terminus, an intersection with US 15 (Sumter Highway).

== History ==
SC 441 was established in 1940 from the Sumter–Lee county line southwest of Ashwood north and northeast to SC 44 north-northwest of that community. In 1942, it was extended southwest to end at SC 261 north of Stateburg. In 1945, SC 441, along with SC 261, was extended to Stateburg and then west on a former portion of US 76 to end at the Norfolk Southern Railway crossing west of Stateburg. Two years later, its northern terminus was extended slightly, replacing part of SC 44 and ending at US 15. Also, it was re-routed in Stateburg to replace SC 261 and travel to the south and south-southeast to end at US 76. In 1950, its southern terminus was put back to its previous ending north of Stateburg, with a re-extended SC 261 replacing its previous path. In 2001, it was extended to its current southern terminus.

=== South Carolina Highway 44 ===
South Carolina Highway 44
- Location: Sumter County
- Existed: c.1928–1947

South Carolina Highway 44 (SC 44) was a state highway that existed in the west-central part of Sumter County. By 1929, it was established from the Sumter–Lee county line, southwest of Rembert, to SC 30 in Manville. In 1940, it was extended westward to end at U.S. Route 521 (US 521) in Rembert. In about 1945, the highway was extended again, across SC 261, and then southward to Hagood and Horatio to end at SC 261 in Sanders Corner. In 1947, it was decommissioned and was mostly downgraded to secondary roads, except for its eastern end, which was replaced by SC 441.

The entire route is in Sumter County.

Location	mi	km	Destinations	Notes
Sanders Corner			SC 261	Western terminus
			SC 261	
Rembert			US 521	
Manville			SC 30	Eastern terminus; now US 15
1.000 mi = 1.609 km; 1.000 km = 0.621 mi

== Major intersections ==
County	Location	mi	km	Destinations	Notes
Sumter	Millwood	0.000	0.000	SC 763 (Wedgefield Road) – Wedgefield, Sumter	Southern terminus
Sumter		7.210	11.603	US 76 / US 378 – Columbia, Sumter, Shaw A. F. B.	
Sumter	Dalzell	13.560– 13.570	21.823– 21.839	US 521 (Thomas Sumter Highway) – Fair Play	Interchange
Lee		26.280	42.294	US 15 (Sumter Highway) – Fair Play	Northern terminus
1.000 mi = 1.609 km; 1.000 km = 0.621 mi
