= South Carolina Highway 120 =

State highway

South Carolina Highway 120

Route information
- Maintained by SCDOT
- Length: 17.390 mi (27.986 km)

Major junctions
- West end: SC 261 in Pinewood
- SC 763 in Sumter
- East end: US 76 / US 378 in Sumter

Location
- Country: United States
- State: South Carolina
- Counties: Sumter

Highway system
- South Carolina State Highway System; Interstate; US; State; Scenic
← SC 119	→ SC 121

South Carolina Highway 120 (SC 120) is a 17.390-mile (27.986 km) state highway in the U.S. state of South Carolina. The highway connects Pinewood and Sumter.

== Route description ==
SC 120 begins at an intersection with SC 261 (West Fulton Street) in Pinewood within Sumter County, where the roadway continues as West Avenue South. It travels to the north-northeast and travels along the eastern edge of Manchester State Forest and the Poinsett Electronic Combat Range and occasionally cuts through small segments of the forest. Just south of Tuomey Wildlife Management Area, it curves to the northeast. It passes through parts of Sumter before entering the census designated place of Millwood. Upon leaving Millwood, the highway re-enters Sumter and immediately intersects SC 763 (Wedgefield Road), next to Millwood Elementary School. The two highways travel concurrently to the northeast. At Alice Drive, SC 120 splits off to the north-northwest. It passes Alice Drive Elementary School, which is just southwest of the University of South Carolina Sumter campus. At South Wise Drive, the highway passes Palmetto Park. It begins to curve to the north and meets its eastern terminus, an intersection with U.S. Route 76 (US 76)/US 378 (Broad Street). Here, Alice Drive curves to the northeast to an intersection with US 521 (Camden Highway).

== Major intersections ==
The entire route is in Sumter County.

Location	mi	km	Destinations	Notes
Pinewood	0.000	0.000	SC 261 (West Fulton Street) – Manning, Stateburg	
Sumter	14.000– 14.020	22.531– 22.563	SC 763 west (Wedgefield Road) – Wedgefield	Western end of SC 763 concurrency
Sumter	14.760	23.754	SC 763 east (West Liberty Street)	Eastern end of SC 763 concurrency
Sumter	17.390	27.986	US 76 / US 378 (Broad Street)	
1.000 mi = 1.609 km; 1.000 km = 0.621 mi: Concurrency terminus
