= South Carolina Highway 763 =

State highway in South Carolina, United States

South Carolina Highway 763

Route information
- Maintained by SCDOT
- Length: 13.950 mi (22.450 km)

Major junctions
- South end: SC 261 in Wedgefield
- US 521 in Sumter; US 76 Bus. in Sumter; US 15 in Sumter
- North end: US 378 in East Sumter

Location
- Country: United States
- State: South Carolina
- Counties: Sumter

Highway system
- South Carolina State Highway System; Interstate; US; State; Scenic
← SC 760	→ SC 764

South Carolina Highway 763 (SC 763) is a 13.950-mile-long (22.450 km) state highway in the U.S. state of South Carolina. The highway connects Wedgefield and Sumter, via Cane Savannah and Millwood. It is signed north-south, but it travels east-west.

== Route description ==
SC 763 begins at an intersection with SC 261 (South Kings Highway) in Wedgefield, Sumter County. It travels to the east-northeast, paralleling railroad tracks along its way. At the intersection with Tillman Nursery Road, it begins traveling along the northern edge of the Manchester State Forest. It skirts along the edge of the forest for approximately 1,500 feet (460 m). At the intersection with Bullett Road, SC 763 leaves Wedgefield proper and begins skirting along the northern edge of the town. At Burnt Gin Road, it begins to travel along another section of the state forest. The highway stays along the edge of the forest for just under 1,500 feet (460 m). When the highway crosses Cane Savannah Creek, it leaves Wedgefield and begins to travel along the northern edge of Cane Savannah. It crosses Hatchet Camp Branch. Just before it intersects St. Pauls Church Road, it curves to the northeast, leaves Cane Savannah, and crosses over the railroad tracks it parallels from its southern terminus. It heads to the east-southeast and travels through a small section of the city limits of Sumter. The highway then enters Millwood. It travels in a more easterly direction and intersects the western terminus of SC 441 (Loring Mill Road). Just before Wildwood Avenue, it leaves Millwood and re-enters Sumter. It then turns left onto SC 120 (Pinewood Road) just northeast of Millwood Elementary School. The two highways travel concurrently to the northeast. They cross over Second Millpond and split at Alice Drive. SC 763 travels through the Iris Gardens and crosses over Swan Lake. At Guignard Drive is an intersection with U.S. Route 521 (US 521). At Washington Street, US 76 Business (US 76 Bus.) starts a concurrency with SC 763. Five blocks later, they intersect US 15 (Lafayette Drive). They cross over some railroad tracks and split just north of Eastwood Park. SC 763 travels along the southern edge of East Sumter until it meets its northern terminus, a partial interchange with US 378 (Robert E. Graham Freeway/Myrtle Beach Highway).

== Major intersections ==
The entire route is in Sumter County.

Location	mi	km	Destinations	Notes
Wedgefield	0.000	0.000	SC 261 (South Kings Highway) – Pinewood, Stateburg, Columbia	Western terminus
Millwood	7.950	12.794	SC 441 east (Loring Mill Road)	Western terminus of SC 441
Sumter	8.230	13.245	SC 120 west (Pinewood Road) – Pinewood	Southern end of SC 120 concurrency
Sumter	8.990	14.468	SC 120 east (Alice Drive) – Fair Play	Northern end of SC 120 concurrency
Sumter	9.850	15.852	US 521 (Guignard Drive) – Manning, Camden	
Sumter	10.730	17.268	US 76 Bus. west (North Washington Street) – Camden, Columbia	Southern end of US 76 Bus. concurrency
Sumter	11.230	18.073	US 15 (Lafayette Drive) – Summerton, Bishopville, Sumter Airport	
Sumter	11.750	18.910	US 76 Bus. east (East Liberty Street)	Northern end of US 76 Bus. concurrency
East Sumter	13.950	22.450	US 378 (Robert E. Graham Freeway/Myrtle Beach Highway) – Pendleton	Partial interchange; no access from SC 763 to US 378 west
1.000 mi = 1.609 km; 1.000 km = 0.621 mi: Concurrency terminus; Incomplete access
