= High Hills of Santee =

Long and narrow hilly region in western Sumter County

Coordinates: 33.984°N 80.548°W

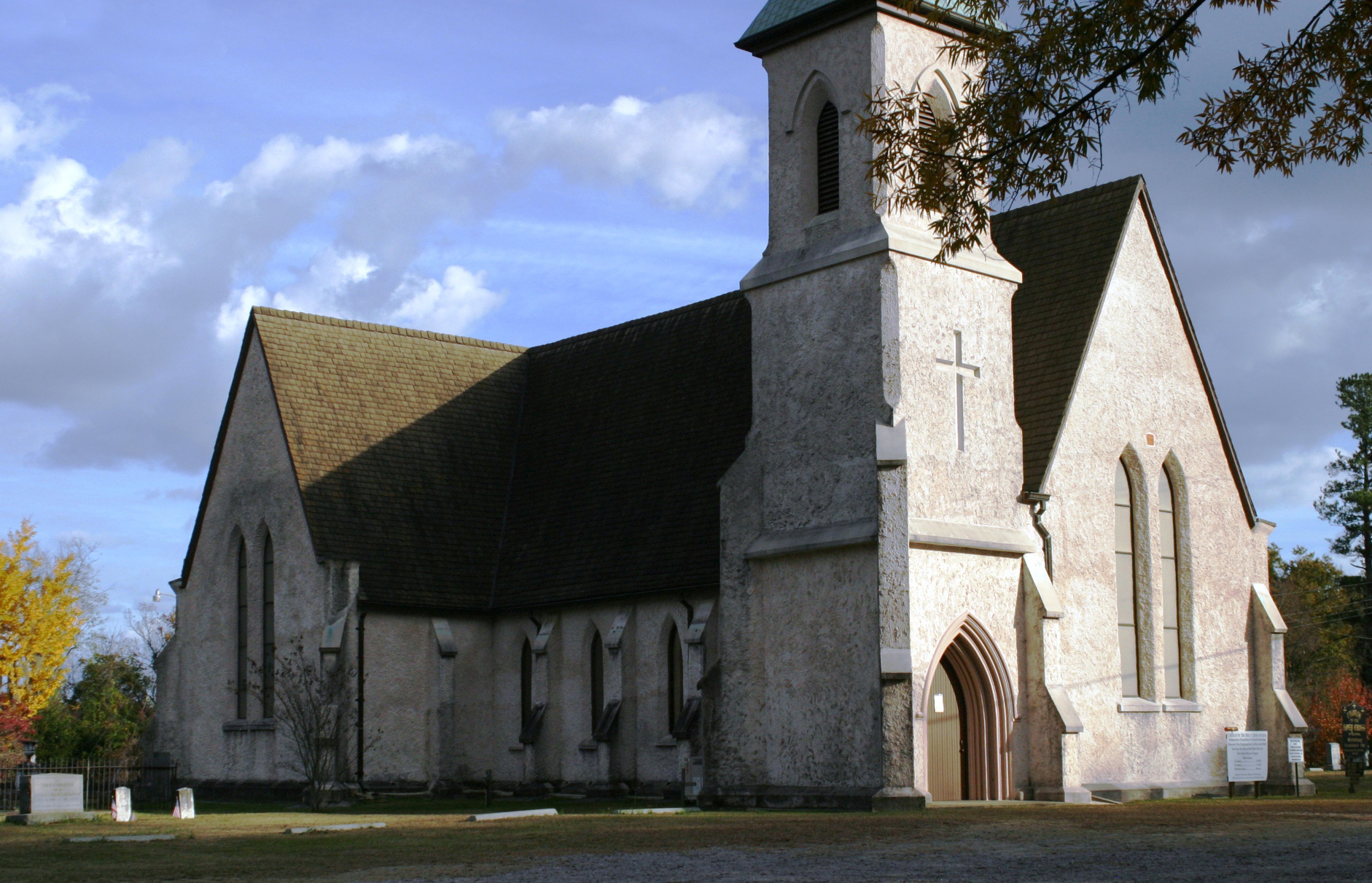
Historic Church of the Holy Cross, Stateburg, High Hills of the Santee

The High Hills of Santee, sometimes known as the High Hills of the Santee, is a long, narrow hilly region in the western part of Sumter County, South Carolina. It has been called "one of the state's most famous areas". The High Hills of Santee region lies north of the Santee River and east of the Wateree River, one of the two rivers that join to form the Santee. It extends north almost to the Kershaw county line and northeasterly to include the former summer resort town of Bradford Springs. Since 1902 the town has been included in Lee County.

The county was named after Thomas Sumter, who came from Virginia, married a local widow in 1767, and with her became a successful plantation owner. He later became noted as a general in the Revolution. After the war, Sumter represented South Carolina in the United States House of Representatives and the Senate.

The High Hills of Santee name has been in use since the 18th century, when the area became a popular resort for wealthy planters. They built summer homes in the region to escape the oppressive "heat and malaria of the Lowcountry" during the summer sick season. In the 18th and 19th centuries, the High Hills of Santee was the location of many cotton plantations, and had a large population of enslaved Africans as laborers. Among the planter families were The Broughtons, The Dinkins, Richardsons, and the Singletons, whose daughter Angelica married Abraham Van Buren eldest son of Martin Van Buren and served as First Lady of the United States after his election as a widower president following the second term of President Andrew Jackson.

The South Carolina historian David Duncan Wallace placed the area in what he called the "red hill region" of the state. He wrote: "The High Hills of Santee paralleling the Wateree River on its east attain an almost mountainous appearance. The region contains much good land."

The area includes three National Historic Landmarks, one National Historic District, and several structures listed on the National Register of Historic Places. It has attractive outdoor recreational areas such as Poinsett State Park and Manchester State Forest.

Despite the short distances to Columbia and Sumter, the High Hills of Santee are relatively rural and isolated, as the area was in antebellum times.

== Historic sites ==
Historic sites in the High Hills of Santee include three National Historic Landmarks:

- Borough House Plantation, Stateburg;
- Church of the Holy Cross, Stateburg; and
- Millford Plantation, north of Pinewood.

Other places listed on the National Register of Historic Places include:

- Lenoir Store, Horatio;
- Magnolia Hall, Hagood;
- Pinewood Depot, Pinewood, the "southern entrance" to the High Hills;
- Broughton's Graveyard and Singleton's Graveyard, are due south of Wedgefield;
- St. Mark's Episcopal Church (Pinewood, South Carolina);
- St. Philip's Episcopal Church (Bradford Springs, South Carolina); and
- Stateburg Historic District. It includes two of the area's three National Historic Landmarks: Borough House Plantation and Church of the Holy Cross, within its boundaries, plus at least eight contributing properties, including:
  - High Hills of Santee Baptist Church.

== Notable residents ==
- Richard H. Anderson, Confederate general, was born at Borough House Plantation.
- J.J. Broughton, Five generations of Broughtons with extensive land holdings dating back to "Kings Grant" of Seven miles of property along the Santee. Farming, cattle, logging and Broughton's Mill at Mill Creek. Plantation house located in Pinewood, SC destroyed by fire of 1937. Broughton Family funded the Baptist church and in the 1920s the Presbyterian Church in Pinewood.
- Mary Boykin Chesnut, author of A Diary from Dixie, was born in Stateburg, the daughter of Stephen Decatur Miller and his wife, Mary Boykin.
- Richard Furman, pioneering Baptist minister, first pastor of High Hills of the Santee Baptist Church. Furman University is named for him.
- John L. Manning, original owner of Millford Plantation and governor of South Carolina.
- Richard Irvine Manning III, (1859–1931), Governor of South Carolina.
- Wyndham Meredith Manning, (1890–1967), South Carolina politician and son of Richard Irvine Manning III, born in Wedgefield.
- Stephen Decatur Miller, owner of the plantation, Miller House, later known as Ellison House; South Carolina governor, congressman and U.S. senator.
- Thomas Sumter, early settler and general in the Revolution.
- Angelica Singleton Van Buren, First Lady of the United States.

== Notable plantations and houses ==
The High Hills of Santee had many notable plantations, most of which grew cotton with slave labor. Some of them survive.

- The Cedars and the Pines, Springhill
- Summer Home in Bradford Springs, owned by Capt. James Gaillard of Charleston.
- Orange Grove (Dalzell, South Carolina)
- Bloomhill, Wedgefield;
- Borough House, Stateburg;
- Home House, Stateburg, no longer extant, belonged to General Thomas Sumter, who is buried there;
- Brookland Plantation House, Old Charleston Road (State Route 261), Stateburg vicinity;
- Homefield, Stateburg;
- James Hill, Stateburg;
- Magnolia Hall, Hagood;
- Marden, Stateburg;
- Melrose, Wedgefield, location of Singleton's Graveyard;
- Midway, Wedgefield;
- Miller House, later known as Ellison House, Stateburg;
- Millford, Pinewood;
- Moor Hill, owned by Thomas Sumter, grandson of the general, and later by DeSaussure Bull, a descendant of William Bull II;
- Needwood, Stateburg;
- The Oaks, Stateburg-Wedgefield Road, Stateburg;
- Ramsey House, Poinsett State Park;
- The Ruins, Stateburg, owned by General Thomas Sumter, then by John Mayrant
- San Souci, Stateburg, home of Edward Rutledge, governor; and
- Woodlawn, Stateburg.

== Places ==
Places, past and present, in the High Hills of Santee, include:

- Bradford Springs,
- Claremont
- Dixie Crossing
- Foxville, also known as Camden Junction
- Garner's Ferry, formerly Brisbane's Ferry, originally Simmons Ferry
- Hagood, formerly Sanders Station
- Horatio, formerly Louellen
- Manchester,
- Middleton, formerly Clarendon Depot
- Pinewood, formerly Clarendon
- Stark's Ferry
- Stateburg, formerly Stateborough
- Stateburg Station
- Wateree Junction and
- Wedgefield

== Transportation ==
=== River ===
The Wateree River was one of the first means of access to the High Hills of Santee. Manchester became its gateway river port. There were ferry crossings at Garner's Ferry near Stateburg and further south at Stark's Ferry near Manchester.

=== Roads ===
The major north–south road in the High Hills of Santee since the 18th century has been "Kings Highway". It originally ran from Charleston to Camden. It followed an older trail of the Catawba Tribe. Today Kings Highway in the High Hills is South Carolina Highway 261. The major east west road is U.S. Route 76/US Route 378, a four-lane, divided highway between Sumter and Columbia, which intersects South Carolina Highway 261 just south of Stateburg. This intersection is 32 miles from Columbia and 12 miles from Sumter. The original Sumter to Columbia road was "Garner's Ferry Road," a part of which exists north in Stateburg. Most of U.S. Route 76/US Route 378 in Richland County still carries this name.

Millford Plantation was sometimes called Manning's Folly, partly because of its remote location.

=== Railroads ===
An antebellum branch of the former South Carolina Railroad ran from Wateree east across the river to Wateree Junction and then north on the west of Kings Highway through Middleton, Foxville, Dixie Crossing, the former Stateburg Station on Garner's Ferry Road, Claremont, Horatio, Hagood and then into Kershaw County. It ran through Boykin before reaching Camden. At Wateree Junction, it met the Wilmington and Manchester Railroad, which ran from Manchester to Wilmington, North Carolina.

In April 1865 General Edward E. Potter and his Union Army troops "discovered nine locomotives and approximately 200 cars from the rolling stock of the Wilmington & Manchester and South Carolina Railroads. His army proceeded to burn, blow up, and otherwise destroy these trains and tracks." During World War II, much of the scrap metal from the wreckage was salvaged for the war effort. In 1997 the remaining rails and cross ties were removed.

From Sumter today one railroad line runs west to Wedgefield and across the Wateree to Eastover. Another runs southwest to Pinewood and across the Upper Santee River" connecting Remini and Low Falls, SC across the Lake Marion now flooded swamp called Sparkleberry to Calhoun County. There is no longer any passenger service on these lines.

=== Foot trail ===
The High Hills of Santee Passage is a hiking trail through the area and is part of the Palmetto Trail.

== Gallery ==
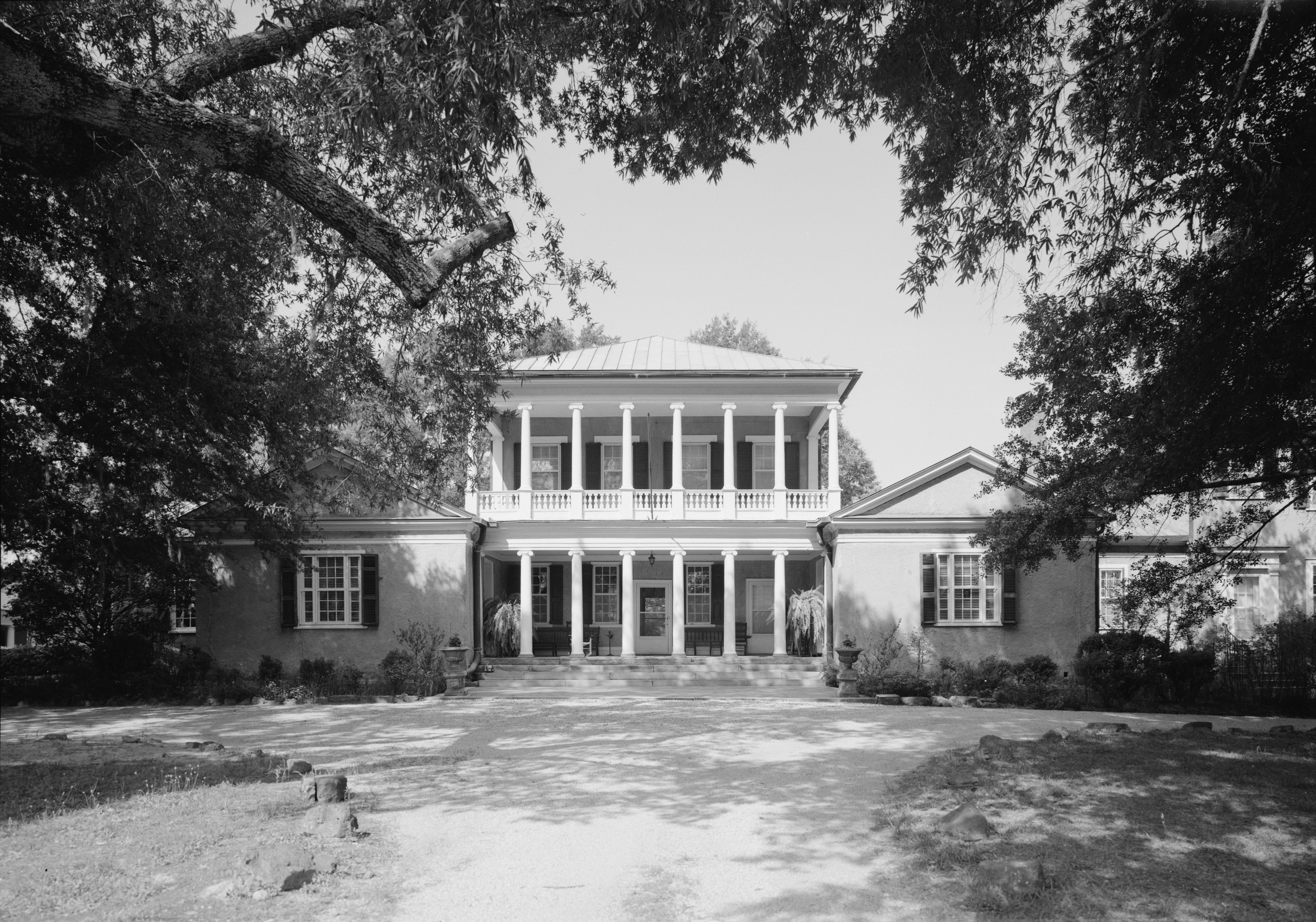
Borough House Plantation

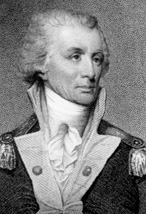
Portrait of General Thomas Sumter, c. 1790

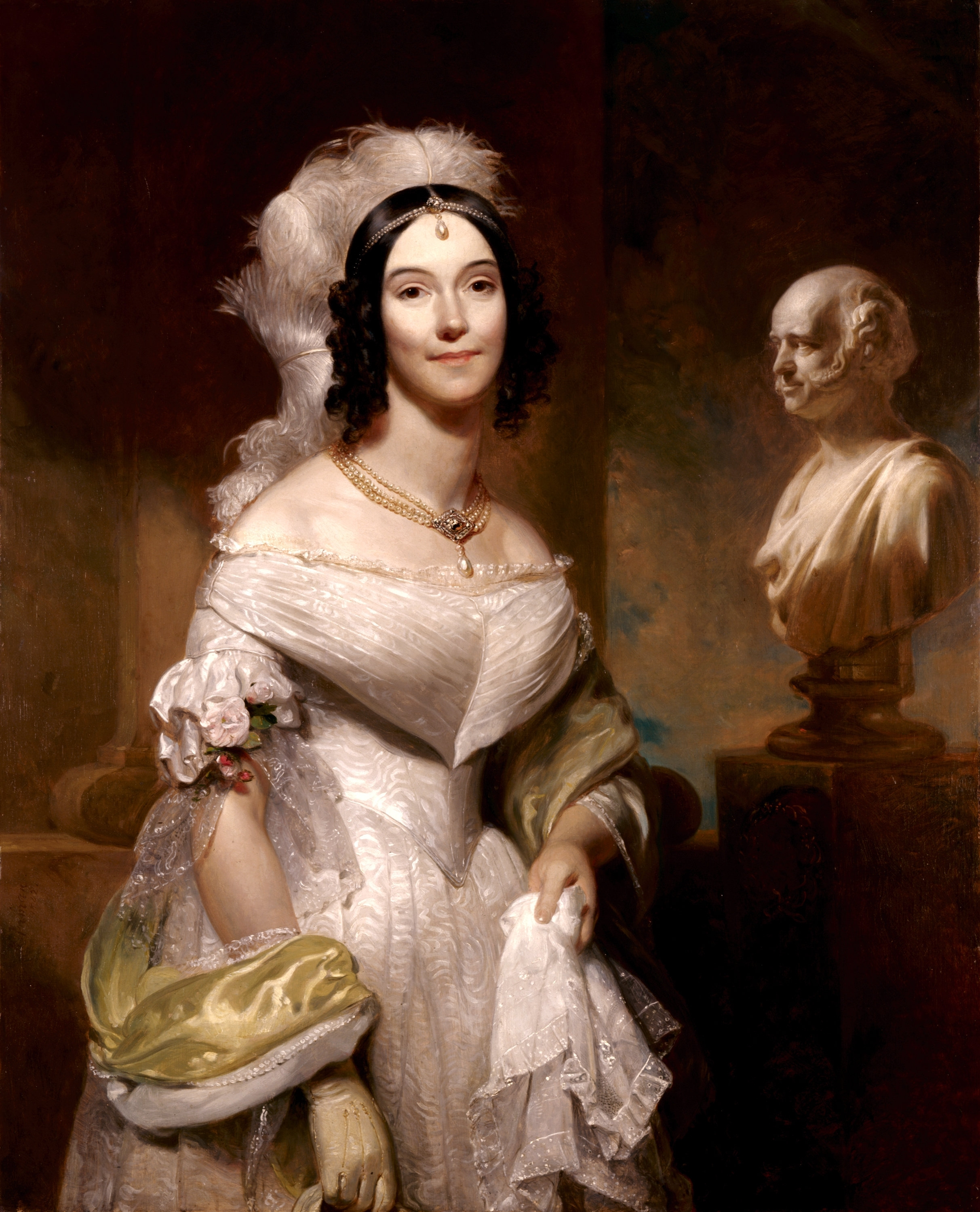
Portrait of Angelica Van Buren by Henry Inman (1842)

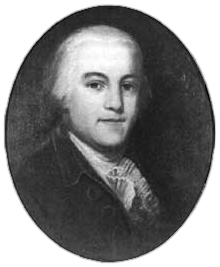
Edward Rutledge, signer of the Declaration of Independence and later governor

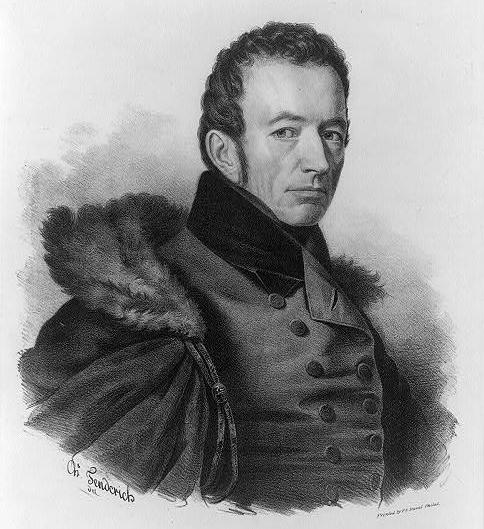
Joel Roberts Poinsett, statesman and botanist, for whom the Poinsettia was named died at Borough House and was buried in the Holy Cross churchyard.

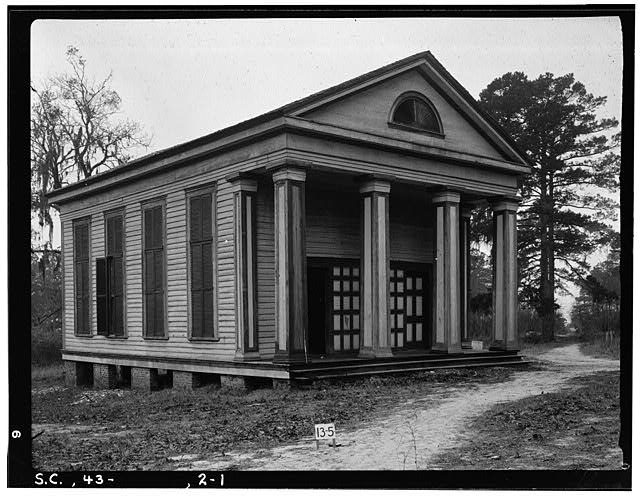
High Hills of Santee Baptist Church

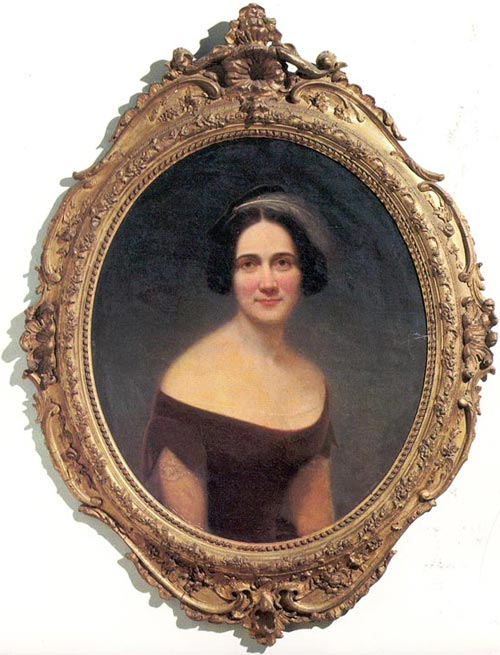
Mary Boykin Chesnut
