= High Hills of Santee Baptist Church =

Historic church in South Carolina, United States

- High Hills of Santee Baptist Church; Stateburg, South Carolina
- U.S. Historic district – Contributing property
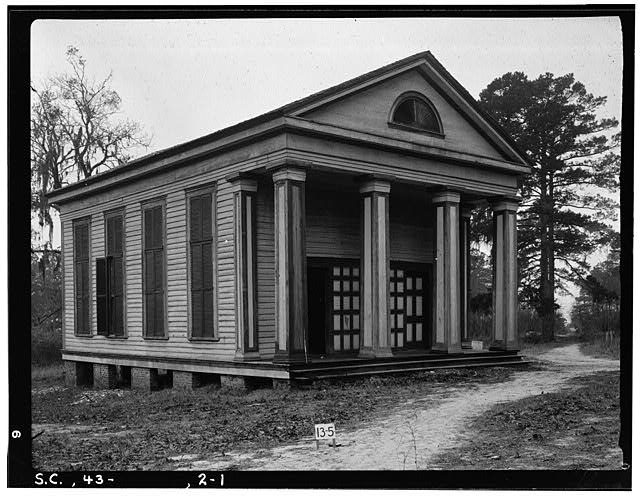
- High Hills of Santee Baptist Church in 1934

- Location within South Carolina Location within the United States
- Location: near Dalzell, South Carolina
- Coordinates: 33.98508°N 80.534224°W
- Built: 1803
- Architectural style: Greek Revival

High Hills of Santee Baptist Church is an historic Southern Baptist church located in the High Hills of Santee in Stateburg, near Dalzell in Sumter County, South Carolina. Its congregation was founded in 1772 and the present church was built in 1848. Its first pastor was Richard Furman, who went on to become one of South Carolina's most influential ministers. Furman University was named for him. Many of the Baptist churches in the area are offshoots of this church.

High Hills of Santee Baptist Church is a contributing property in the Stateburg Historic District, which was listed on the National Register of Historic Places on February 24, 1971.

High Hills Baptist Church is a member of the Santee Baptist Association.

== Gallery ==
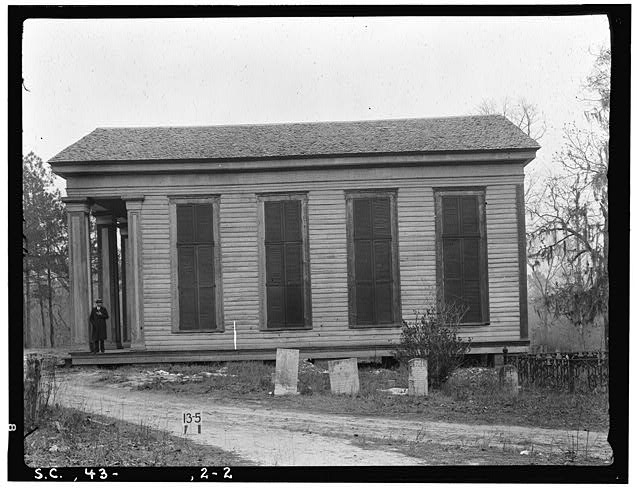
Side elevation

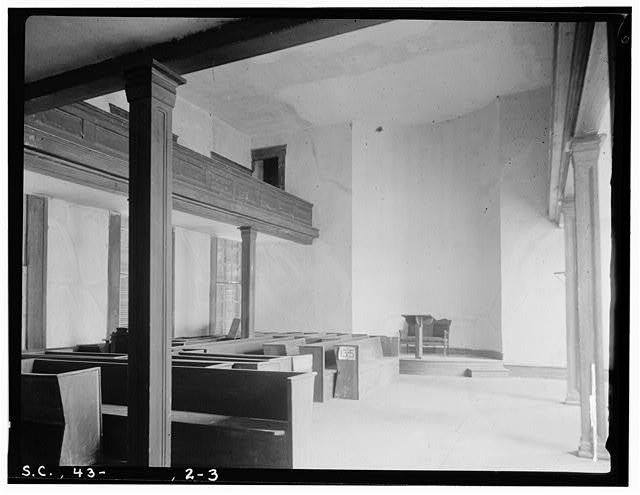
Interior

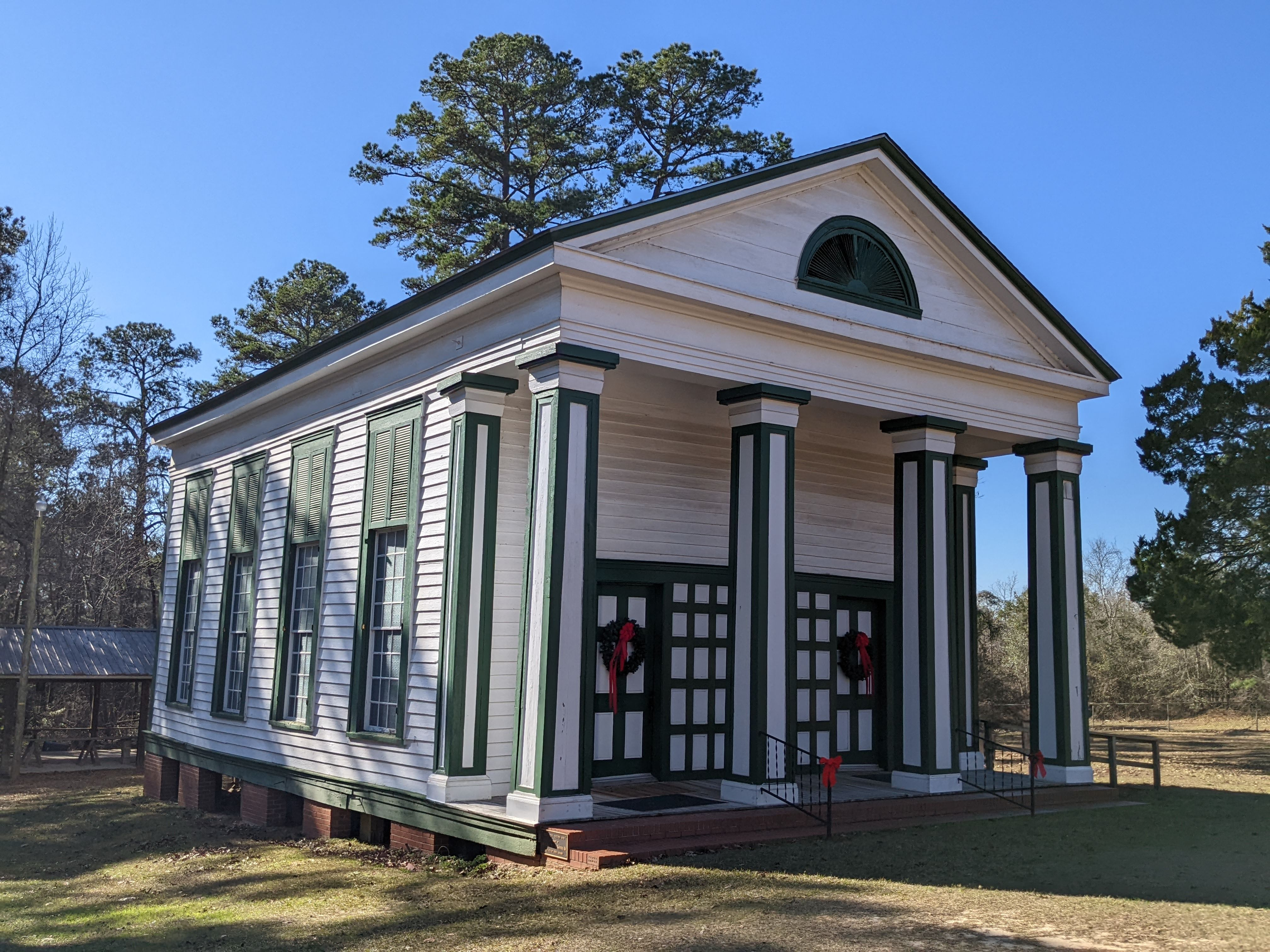
Modern day exterior
