= McKoy =

McKoy is a surname. Notable people with the surname include:

- Millie and Christine McKoy (1851–1912), siamese twins, "The Two-headed Nightingale"
- David McKoy (born 1983), Canadian football player
- Grainger McKoy (born 1947), American artist
- Lorna McKoy, West Indian cricketer
- Mark McKoy (born 1961), Canadian/Austrian hurdler
- Nick McKoy (born 1986), English footballer
- Noel McKoy, English soul singer
- Olivia McKoy (born 1973), Jamaican javelin thrower
- Wayne McKoy (born 1958), American basketball player
