= Manville, South Carolina =

- Census-designated place
- Location within South Carolina Location within the United States
- Coordinates: 34°09′35″N 80°17′51″W
- Country: United States
- State: South Carolina
- County: Lee

Area
  - Total: 2.72 sq mi (7.04 km^{2})
  - Land: 2.72 sq mi (7.04 km^{2})
  - Water: 0 sq mi (0.00 km^{2})
- Elevation: 220 ft (67 m)

Population (2020)
  - Total: 471
  - Density: 173.2/sq mi (66.88/km^{2})
- Time zone: UTC-5 (Eastern (EST))
  - Summer (DST): UTC-4 (EDT)
- ZIP Code: 29010 (Bishopville)
- Area codes: 803/839
- FIPS code: 45-44395
- GNIS feature ID: 2812973

Manville is an unincorporated community and census-designated place (CDP) in Lee County, South Carolina, United States. It was first listed as a CDP prior to the 2020 census with a population of 471.

The CDP is in central Lee County along U.S. Route 15, 5 miles (8 km) southwest of Bishopville, the county seat, and 17 miles (27 km) north of Sumter. South Carolina Highway 441 has its northeastern terminus at US 15 just south of the CDP; Highway 441 leads southwest 19 miles (31 km) to U.S. Routes 76 and 378 next to Shaw Air Force Base west of Sumter. Scape Ore Swamp, a tributary of the Black River, forms the western border of the community.

== Demographics ==
Historical population
Census	Pop.	Note	%±
2020	471		—
U.S. Decennial Census; 2020

Manville first appeared as a census designated place in the 2020 U.S. census.

=== 2020 census ===
Manville CDP, South Carolina – Demographic Profile (NH = Non-Hispanic) Note: the US Census treats Hispanic/Latino as an ethnic category. This table excludes Latinos from the racial categories and assigns them to a separate category. Hispanics/Latinos may be of any race.
Race / Ethnicity	Pop 2020	% 2020
White alone (NH)	137	29.09%
Black or African American alone (NH)	318	67.52%
Native American or Alaska Native alone (NH)	2	0.42%
Asian alone (NH)	0	0.00%
Pacific Islander alone (NH)	0	0.00%
Some Other Race alone (NH)	0	0.00%
Mixed Race/Multi-Racial (NH)	10	2.12%
Hispanic or Latino (any race)	4	0.85%
Total	471	100.00%
