= Pinewood station =

- Pinewood Depot
- U.S. National Register of Historic Places
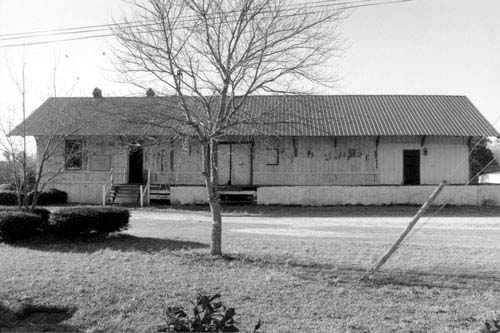

- Location within South Carolina Location within the United States
- Location: Junction of East Avenue and Clark(e) Street Pinewood, South Carolina
- Coordinates: 33°44′25″N 80°27′47″W
- Area: 0.1 acres (0.040 ha)
- Built: 1889
- Architectural style: Late 19th And Early 20th Century American Movements
- NRHP reference No.: 97000535
- Added to NRHP: June 10, 1997

Pinewood Depot is an historic railway station located at the junction of East Avenue and Clarke Street in the town of Pinewood, at the southern entrance of the High Hills of Santee, South Carolina. It is the only railroad station left in Sumter County, but is not longer used by CSX, the current owner of the railroad right-of-way. On June 10, 1997, it was added to the National Register of Historic Places.

== History ==
In 1888 the Manchester and Augusta Railroad began construction of the Pinewood Depot on its Sumter to Denmark line. By the time it was finished in 1889, the railroad had become part of the Atlantic Coast Line Railroad. The town, originally known as Clarendon, after the name of the county it was then in, grew up around the station. In 1902 the town officially became Pinewood and in 1920 it left Clarendon County to become part of Sumter County. Passenger service ceased in the mid-1950s and the building was unused for many years. In 1992 the Seaboard Coast Line Railroad leased the building to the town, which has since turned it over to the Sumter County Historical Society, its current owner.

== See also ==
- List of Registered Historic Places in South Carolina

Preceding station	Atlantic Coast Line Railroad	Following station
Former services
Remini toward Augusta	Augusta – Florence	Sumter toward Florence
