= Magnolia Hall (Hagood, South Carolina) =

Historic house in South Carolina, United States

- U.S. National Register of Historic Places
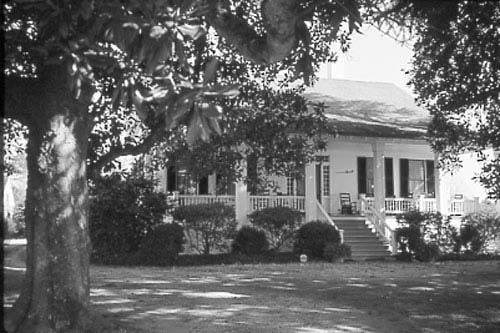

- Location within South Carolina Location within the United States
- Location: 2025 Horatio-Hagood Rd., Hagood, South Carolina
- Coordinates: 34°03′13″N 80°34′08″W
- Area: 36.4 acres (14.7 ha)
- Built: 1821
- Architectural style: Greek Revival
- NRHP reference No.: 99000101
- Added to NRHP: September 2, 1999

Magnolia Hall is an historic plantation located in the High Hills of Santee at 2025 Horatio-Hagood Road, Hagood, South Carolina. Its Greek Revival plantation house was built in 1821 by its owner Isaac Barnes. After Dr. Swepson Saunders bought the property in 1853, he added onto it in 1855 and 1860.

Magnolia Hall was threatened with destruction by Union troops in April 1865, under the command of Brigadier General Edward E. Potter, but was reportedly saved by the actions of Dr. Saunder's slave cook in feeding the troops when they appeared. Dr. Saunders, who took refuge somewhere between Magnolia Hall and Stateburg, wrote to his wife that he had seen the burning houses in Stateburg and had expected to see their own house burning.

On September 2, 1999, Magnolia Hall was added to the National Register of Historic Places. It is also known as the Dr. Swepson Saunders House.

== See also ==
- List of Registered Historic Places in South Carolina
