= Sumter Tribe of Cheraw Indians =

American Indian tribe recognized by South Carolina

- Named after: Sumter, SC; Cheraw people
- Formation: January 28, 2013; 13 years ago
- Type: state-recognized tribe, nonprofit organization
- Tax ID no.: EIN 81-3475516
- Purpose: A23: Cultural, Ethnic Awareness
- Headquarters: Sumter, South Carolina
- Location: United States
- Official language: English
- President: Tammy Ray Stevens
- Chief: Francis Benenhaley
- Website: sumtercherawindians.org
- Formerly called: Sumter Band of Cheraw Indians

The Sumter Tribe of Cheraw Indians is a state-recognized tribe and nonprofit organization in South Carolina. It is not a federally recognized American Indian tribe.

== Nonprofit ==
On January 8, 2007, the leadership of the Sumter Tribe of Cheraw Indians first formed as a nonprofit organization, originally being called the Sumter Band of Cheraw Indians.

They are based in Sumter, South Carolina, and Ralph Justice Oxendine is their registered agent.

Tammy Ray Stevens has served as their president and their principal officer. They have been based in Manning, South Carolina.

== State-recognition ==
In 2013, the State of South Carolina gave the organization the state-recognized tribe designation under the SC Code Section 1-31-40 (A) (7)(10), Statutory Authority Chapter 139 (100–110). They are one of nine state-recognized tribes in South Carolina. Francis Benenhaley is their chief.

== See also ==
- Cheraw
- State-recognized tribes in the United States
- Turks of South Carolina
