= Poinsett State Park =

State park in South Carolina, United States

- IUCN category V (protected landscape/seascape)
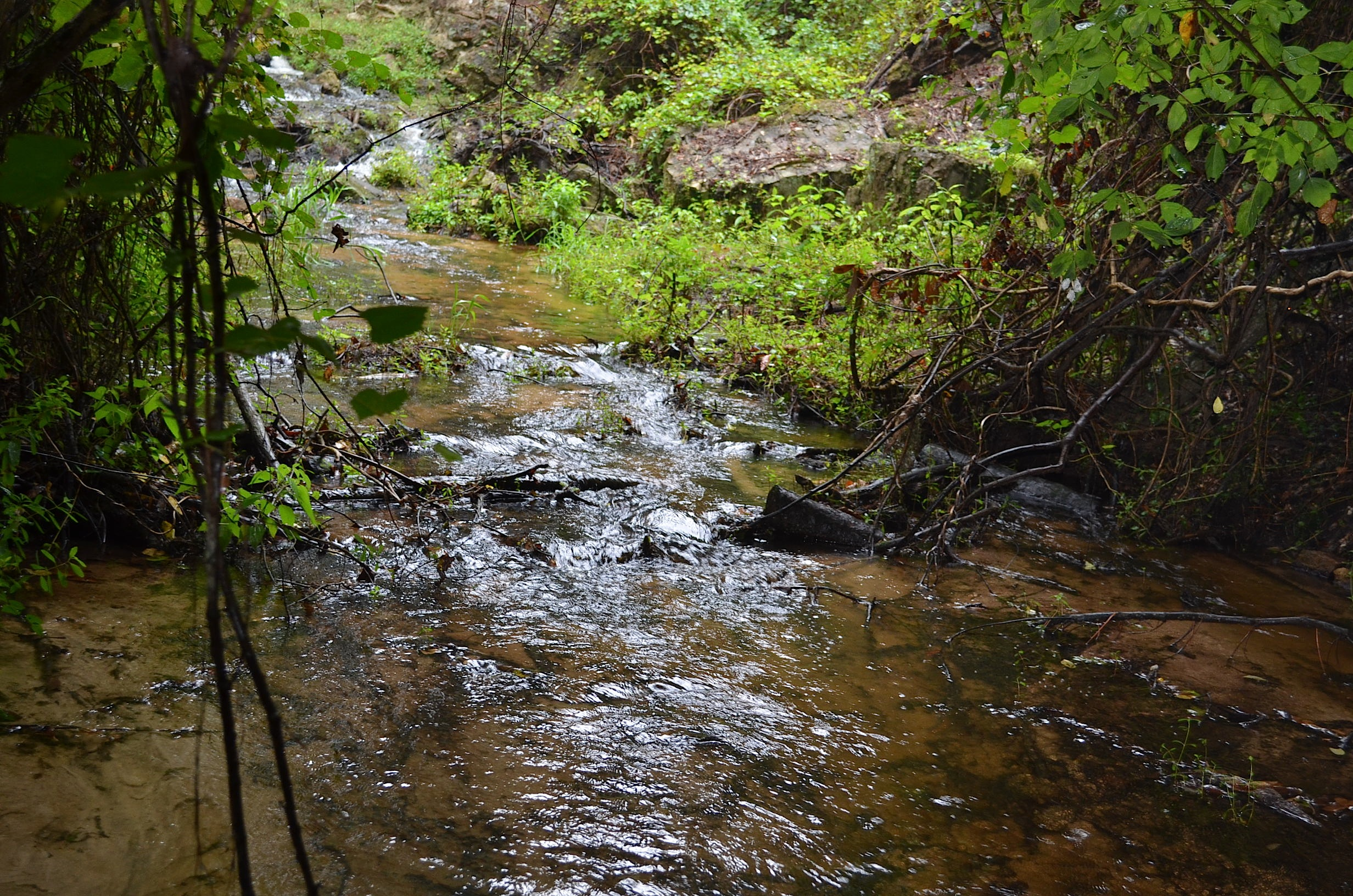
- Shanks Creek, flowing through Poinsett State Park near Wedgefield, South Carolina

- Location within South Carolina
- Location: Sumter County, South Carolina, United States
- Nearest city: Wedgefield, SC
- Coordinates: 33°48′24″N 80°32′22″W
- Area: 1,010 acres (4.1 km^{2})
- Established: 1936
- Visitors: 48,256 (in fy 2006-2007)
- Governing body: South Carolina Department of Parks, Recreation, and Tourism
- Website: www.southcarolinaparks.com/park-finder/state-park/662.aspx

Poinsett State Park is located in Sumter County, South Carolina. The park is best known for its botanical oddities, combining flora from the foothills of the Blue Ridge Mountains, the Piedmont region of Upstate South Carolina, the xeric Sandhills, and the Atlantic coastal plain. Poinsett State Park contains mountain laurels draped with Spanish moss. The park is named after Joel Roberts Poinsett, former United States Secretary of War, the first American ambassador to Mexico and the popularizer of the poinsettia. The park is surrounded by the Manchester State Forest and provides access to the Palmetto Trail, as well as linked hiking and mountain bike trails. Manchester State Forest also features designated equestrian trails.

Poinsett State Park is located in the High Hills of Santee, a nearly 25-mile-long upland region with hills up to 5 miles wide. Formed from the erosion of an ancient seashore, the High Hills of Santee lie on the eastern side of the upper Santee River and extend north through Sumter and Lee Counties, running parallel to the Wateree River.

== History ==
=== History of the Land ===
The site was used by various Siouan tribes of Native Americans, including the Santee, Wateree and Catawba, primarily for hunting. The non-Siouan Congaree lived nearby and may have also frequented the area.

In the 1740s, brothers John and Timothy Dargan purchased several hundred acres of land in the High Hills. In the late 1760s, Matthew Singleton, a Virginia settler, purchased part of the Dargan property. On this land, Singleton developed and lived in Melrose Plantation. In 1813 and 1814, the land was deeded to two members of the Singleton family, who owned many plantations in Sumter County. The Melrose plantation burned in Potter’s Raid, a three-week destruction effort led by General Edward E. Potter, and only a graveyard remained on the property. Throughout the nineteenth century, the Williman, Belser, Manning, Wells, and Levi families also held land in the High Hills of Santee.

In the early 1930s, Sumter County bought 1,000 acres of this land (4 km^{2}) and donated it to the South Carolina Forestry Commission to create Poinsett State Park, the second state park established in South Carolina.

=== Civilian Conservation Corps ===
Poinsett State Park was the first of many parks built by the Civilian Conservation Corps in South Carolina. Three different CCC companies, each with around 200 men, worked on the park. Construction began on October 22, 1934, and the park opened to the public on August 5, 1936.

==== CCC Company 421 ====
Company 421 was the first Civilian Conservation Corps (CCC) company to work on Poinsett State Park. The company was composed of young, white, men with limited formal education. They arrived in October 1934 and departed in late summer 1935 to work on an erosion prevention project in Rock Hill, South Carolina.

Company 421’s contributions to the park included constructing roads, installing water, power, and telephone lines, building a picnic shelter, initiating the construction of a bathhouse and park ranger residence, and restoring Old Levi Mill Lake. Although the park was not officially open during this period, it attracted visitors, with attendance on weekends and holidays reaching up to 500 people.

While stationed at Poinsett State Park, Company 421 members had access to educational opportunities. Course offerings included camp work, forestry, agriculture, woodworking, mechanics, algebra, French, piano, voice, and swimming. Lifeguarding classes from the American Red Cross were also available. Enrollees participated in sports such as basketball, baseball, boxing, tennis, and volleyball. Company 421 interacted with the nearby white community through dances, concerts and field trips.

Company 421 published a monthly camp paper, Poinsette Pointers, which covered topics such as education, athletics, hunting, religion, and social events, paid homage to camp leaders, and featured sketches, stories, poems, advertisements and medical reports.

==== CCC Company 4475 ====
On August 19, 1935, around 200 African American CCC enrollees from Greenwood, Clinton, and Orangeburg cities in South Carolina arrived at Poinsett State Park as Company 4475.

Originally designed for white men, the CCC accepted African Americans after former U.S. Representative Oscar De Priest opposed discrimination during the 1933 Emergency Conservation Act. Racial integration in CCC companies was generally limited to areas with low African American enrollment; otherwise, African-American enrollees were typically placed in all-Black camps. Many Southern states, including Georgia, Alabama, Mississippi, and South Carolina, enrolled limited numbers of Black men in the CCC, often only after external pressure. In 1933, South Carolina’s African American population was over 50 percent, and Black enrollees comprised 36 percent of the state’s total CCC enrollees, the highest proportion of African American enrollment of the Southern states. Conversely, in 1933, Mississippi’s African American population was over 50 percent, but Black enrollees made up only 1.7 percent of the state’s CCC enrollment. Georgia and Alabama each enrolled 178 and 776 Black men in 1933, respectively. In 1938, approximately ten percent of all CCC enrollees nationwide were African American.

While working on Poinsett, Company 4475 continued developing park roads, completed the caretaker’s house, and performed additional work on the bathhouse. The Sumter community resisted the presence of an African American CCC company both before the enrollees began work and during their efforts. To avoid contact with white visitors, Company 4475 was not allowed to swim in Old Levi Mill Lake and was denied access to the public portion of the park outside of working hours.

At Poinsett, Company 4475 published a camp paper, Pine Whispers. The publication covered topics similar to Company 421’s Poinsette Pointers but also addressed the CCC’s racial integration and included songs, stories, and poems about the African American CCC experience. Due to racial intolerance, in November 1935, Company 4475 was reassigned to a project in Chester, South Carolina. This caused work on Poinsett State Park to pause.

==== CCC Company 2413 ====
On April 27, 1939, President Roosevelt proclaimed that applicants over the age of 40 should be given fair consideration for entry into the CCC. In 1941, approximately 200,000 veterans had enrolled in the CCC, and there were over 136 veteran CCC companies. In the 1930s and 1940s, many veterans were unemployed and lacked significant education. 49% of CCC veterans had not completed grade school; 29% had completed elementary school but did not attend high school; 14% had from 1 to 3 years of high school; 5% had completed high school; 3% had completed from 1 to 4 years of college. In addition to employment, the CCC offered classes to veteran enrollees.

On February 5, 1936, work on Poinsett resumed when Company 2413 arrived from Givhans Ferry State Park in Ridgeville, South Carolina. Company 2413 consisted of approximately 200 white World War I veterans, with an average age of 41. Most of the men had served overseas, and together, they had experience in 156 different civilian occupations.

Company 2413’s contributions included a recreation building, two picnic shelters, four overnight rental cabins, a reservoir building, five water fountains, and a gatehouse near the park entrance.

Poinsett State Park opened to the public on August 5, 1936. The World War I veterans stayed for nearly 2 more years, transferring to Lake Greenwood State Park in July 1938.

=== Historic Preservation ===
The Civilian Conservation Corps built many structures that are still in use at Poinsett State Park from locally quarried coquina rock. During the days of racial segregation, the nearby state park for African Americans was Mill Creek Group Camp. Poinsett was closed in 1963 for a year, along with all of South Carolina's state parks, due to a Federal court order to desegregate the parks, and it was not until 1966 that all its facilities were reopened. The park's historical elements were listed on the National Register of Historic Places in 2016.

== Flora and Fauna ==
Surveys have found 337 species of flowering plants within the park, including 65 species of trees and shrubs. Tree species include mountain laurel (Kalmia latifolia), white oak (Quercus alba), black oak (Q. velutina), turkey oak (Q. laevis), water oak (Q. nigra), pignut hickory (Carya glabra), loblolly pine (Pinus taeda), longleaf pine (P. palustris), flowering dogwood (Cornus florida), wax myrtle (Morella cerifera), American holly (Ilex opaca), sweetgum (Liquidambar styraciflua), baldcypress (Taxodium distichum), swamp gum (Nyssa biflora), water tupelo (N. aquatica), and red maple (Acer rubrum).

Many species of animals can be found in the park, including copperhead snakes (Agkistrodon contortrix), cottonmouth snakes (A. piscivorus), American alligators (Alligator mississippiensis), and bobcats (Lynx rufus), but these are rarely observed. Animals more typically encountered by visitors include golden silk orb-weaver spiders (Nephila clavipes), largemouth bass (Micropterus salmoides), bullfrogs (Rana catesbeiana), river frogs (Rana heckscheri), spring peeper treefrogs (Pseudacris crucifer), Carolina anole lizards (Anolis carolinensis), five-lined skinks (Eumeces fasciatus), yellow-bellied slider turtles (Trachemys scripta scripta), banded watersnakes (Nerodia fasciata), coachwhip snakes (Masticophis flagellum), eastern hognose snakes (Heterodon platirhinos), Rafinesque's big-eared bats (Corynorhinus rafinesquii), great egrets (Ardea alba), wood ducks (Aix sponsa), turkey vultures (Cathartes aura), red-tailed hawks (Buteo jamaicensis), belted kingfishers (Ceryle alcyon), red-bellied woodpeckers (Melanerpes carolinus), blue-gray gnatcatchers (Polioptila caerulea), and prothonotary warblers (Protonotaria citrea).

== See also ==
- National Register of Historic Places listings in Sumter County, South Carolina
