= Millford Plantation =

Historic house in South Carolina, United States

- U.S. National Register of Historic Places
- U.S. National Historic Landmark
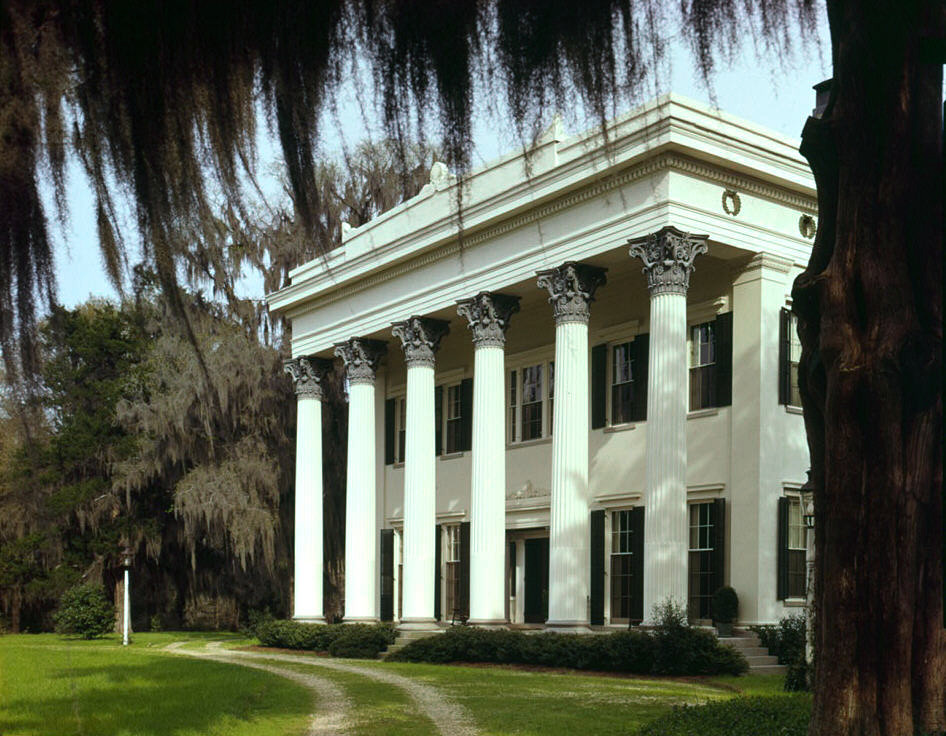
- Millford Plantation as photographed by the Historic American Buildings Survey

- Location within South Carolina Location within the United States
- Location: On SC 261 west of Pinewood, South Carolina
- Coordinates: 33.7484°N 80.53745°W
- Area: 712 acres (2.88 km^{2}) surrounding house (out of 4,251 acres (17.20 km^{2}) total)
- Built: Completed in 1841
- Built by: Nathaniel F. Potter of Providence, Rhode Island
- Architectural style: Greek Revival
- NRHP reference No.: 71000808

Significant dates
- Added to NRHP: November 19, 1971
- Designated NHL: November 7, 1973

Millford Plantation (also spelled Milford) is a historic slaveowner plantation house located on South Carolina Highway 261 west of Pinewood, South Carolina. It was sometimes called Manning's Folly because of its remote location in the High Hills of Santee section of the state and its elaborate details. Designated as a National Historic Landmark, it is regarded as one of the finest examples of Greek Revival residential architecture in the United States. The house has been restored and preserved along with many of its original Duncan Phyfe furnishings.

== History ==
Millford Plantation's monumental two-story Greek Revival mansion was built in Clarendon (now Sumter) County between 1839 and 1841 for John L. Manning and his wife, Susan Frances Hampton Manning. Manning enslaved 670 people of African descent, more than almost any of his contemporaries. Manning served as governor of South Carolina from 1852 to 1854.

The builder, Nathaniel F. Potter of Providence, Rhode Island, may have done the design work. Its imposing facade features six large carved Corinthian columns on granite bases that support the portico. Its 2-foot-thick (0.61 m) walls are of brick made on the premises; the granite was shipped from Rhode Island. The excellence of Millford's architecture extends throughout the house, from the tall floor-to-ceiling windows to a spectacular circular staircase rising, seemingly without support, in a domed cylindrical chamber on the rear side of the building.

Susan Frances Hampton was the daughter of General Wade Hampton I, one of the largest slave owners in the United States, and his wife, Mary Cantey; she was half-sister of Colonel Wade Hampton II. Although by law he inherited from their father after his death in 1835, Wade III shared the estate with Susan and another sister. Much of the money to build the Millford mansion (it cost $125,000, an enormous sum in 1840) probably came from Susan Hampton Manning's recent inheritance. Susan Hampton Manning died in 1845 giving birth to her third child. In 1848 Manning married Sally Bland Clarke and had four children with her.

Near the end of the Civil War, the residence was threatened with destruction by Union troops on April 19, 1865, but was saved by the intervention of Brigadier General Edward E. Potter. His exchange with Manning was recorded as follows:

Potter: This is a fine structure.
Manning: Well, the house was built by a Potter (Nathaniel Potter, the architect) and it looks as though it will be destroyed by a Potter.
Potter: No, you are protected. Nathaniel Potter was my brother.

When General Potter spared Millford, he did not know that Manning had a copy of the Articles of Secession in his desk. The story of Millford's survival might have ended quite differently had he known.

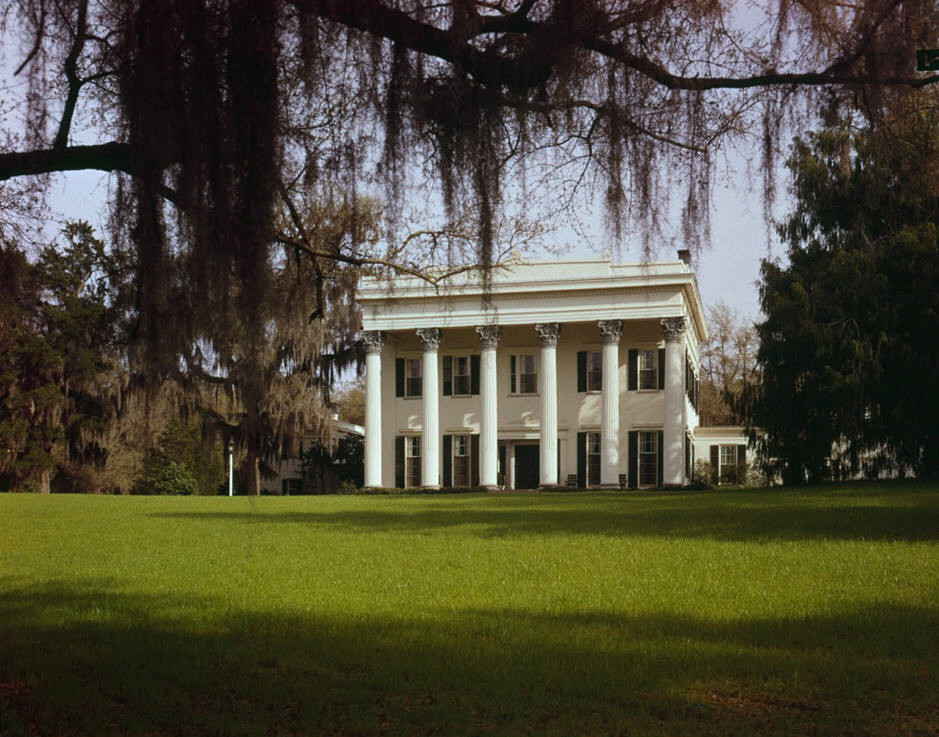
Another view from the Historic American Buildings Survey

Despite economic ruin during and after the Civil War, the Manning family and their descendants managed to retain possession of Millford until 1902, when they sold it to Mary Clark Thompson of New York. She bequeathed it to her two nephews upon her death in 1923. It remained in the Clarks' hands until 1992, used by the family primarily as a winter retreat and for hunting and fishing.

On November 19, 1971, Millford Plantation, also called the Governor John L. Manning House, was added to the National Register of Historic Places and on November 7, 1973, it was declared a National Historic Landmark, due to its historic and artistic importance. The plantation is one of three National Historic Landmarks located on SC 261, the Kings Highway, in the High Hills of Santee. The other two are Borough House Plantation and the Church of the Holy Cross, both in Stateburg.

The house, along with 400 acres of surrounding land, was acquired in May 1992 from three of the Clark descendants and was meticulously restored by Richard Hampton Jenrette. He is one of the founders of the New York investment banking firm, Donaldson, Lufkin & Jenrette, and a collateral descendant of Susan Hampton Manning. He referred to the estate as "the Taj Mahal of my dreams". In 1995, Jenrette received a South Carolina Historic Preservation Award for Millford. In 2006 he received the Governor's Award for his work on Millford and the Robert William Roper House in Charleston, another National Historic Landmark which he owns and restored.

The mansion was donated in December 2008 to the Classical American Homes Preservation Trust, a foundation established by Jenrette to: "Preserve, protect and open to the public examples of classical American residential architecture, fine and decorative arts of the first half of the 19th century." In 2012 the "Friends of Millford" was formed as a group of supporters who appreciate the site and are interested in preserving its legacy for future generations.

== Duncan Phyfe furnishings ==
Manning furnished Millford in the Grecian style, including a considerable quantity of furniture made by Duncan Phyfe (one of America's most celebrated cabinetmakers). Much of the furnishings are still in the house. The furniture belongs to the last phase of Phyfe's career. This period was last studied before the 2011–2012 retrospective exhibition at the Metropolitan Museum of Art. In 1840, Manning made a trip to New York City where he likely visited Phyfe. Between 1840 and 1844, the Mannings placed four separate orders with D. Phyfe & Son (the name of Phyfe's company between 1840 and 1847) for a total of 72 objects. More than 50 of these remain at the house today.

This period in Phyfe's work is characterized by the use of plainer bands of highly polished wood, with little carving, the use of volutes, deep cavetto cornices, simple square columns, Marlboro feet, and console supports (C-scrolls) that were known in the Phyfe shop simply as "Grecian scrolls". The latter, lifted directly from the design vocabulary of French Restoration furniture of the 1820s, were ubiquitous in Phyfe's Grecian plain-style furniture.

Every room of the mansion was filled with D. Phyfe & Son furniture, as is documented by an 1841 letter and bill of lading from the firm. In most rooms the furniture was in a Grecian plain style. For the double parlor, the Phyfes created something new, blending the Grecian with Gothic and French Restoration-style overtones. This is unusual because the Phyfes did not engage generally with the emerging historical revival styles (Baroque, Gothic, Rococo, etc.) that began in the 1830s.

In the entrance hall, most of the furniture is made of walnut, an economical and durable wood. In the double parlors, however, it is mainly of rosewood, an expensive and exotic wood from South America. The use of luxury woods indicates that the double parlors were a space for formal entertaining, a place for the Mannings to display their taste and wealth.

In the dining room, the elliptical table, matching the shape of the room, is made of mahogany; it has four animal–paw feet and six leaves. The other pieces commissioned included, among others, 14 armchairs in the French Restoration style. It was uncommon to have armchairs at a dining table—usually there were armchairs only at the head and foot of the table, the others being side chairs.

When Jenrette bought the property in 1992, less than half of the original furnishings remained in the mansion. Through research, documentation, and consultations with scholars, carried out over many years, he found and purchased much of the original furniture and returned it to its place. Other pieces were given by the descendants of the two families who had owned the plantation. This laborious process continues and more pieces are expected to be returned in the future.

Millford and its furnishings are remarkable in that the entire house was decorated with furniture commissioned from a single cabinetmaker (something uncommon in those days). It was one of the largest orders ever from D. Phyfe. Most pieces are preserved within the same building they were intended to complement and grace, making it unusual in the U.S.

== See also ==
- National Register of Historic Places listings in Sumter County, South Carolina
- List of National Historic Landmarks in South Carolina
- St. Mark's Episcopal Church (Pinewood, South Carolina), the parish church for Millford Plantation.
