= Moors Sundry Act of 1790 =

1790 advisory resolution

The Moors Sundry Act of 1790 was a granted petition ordered by South Carolina House of Representatives, clarifying the status of free subjects of the Sultan of Morocco, Mohammed ben Abdallah. The resolution offered the opinion that free citizens of Morocco were not subject to laws governing blacks and slaves.

== Petition from Sundry Free Moors ==
On January 20, 1790, a petition was presented to the South Carolina House of Representatives from a group of four individuals who were subjects of the Moroccan emperor and residents of the state. They desired that if they happened to commit any fault amenable to be brought to justice, that as subjects to a prince allied with the United States through the Moroccan–American Treaty of Friendship, they would be tried as Citizens instead of under the Negro Act of 1740.

The Free Moors, Francis, Daniel, Hammond and Samuel petitioned on behalf of themselves and their wives Fatima, Flora, Sarah and Clarinda. They explained how some years ago while fighting in defense of their country, they and their wives were captured and made prisoners of war by an African king. After this a certain Captain Clark had them delivered to him, promising they would be redeemed by the Moroccan ambassador residing in England, and returned to their country. Instead, he transported them to South Carolina, and sold them for slaves in violation of the Moroccan treaty. Since then, "by the greatest industry," they purchased freedom from their respective masters. They requested that as free born subjects of a Prince in alliance with the U.S., that they should not be considered subject to a state law (then in force) known as the negro law. If they be found guilty of any crime or misdemeanor, they would receive a fair trial by lawful jury. The matter was referred to a committee consisting of Justice John Faucheraud Grimké, General Charles Cotesworth Pinckney and Edward Rutledge.

=== Free Moors Petition: Committee report ===
Edward Rutledge reported from the committee as ordered, on the petition on the same day and the House agreed to the report, which read as follows:

They have Considered the same and are of opinion that no Law of this State can in its Construction or Operation apply to them, and that persons who were Subjects of the Emperor of Morocco being Free in this State are not triable by the Law for the better Ordering and Governing of Negroes and other Slaves.

Because the petition was granted, it had the force of law because the Moroccan treaty articles stipulates that Moors were not to be enslaved. The report was later published in the Charleston City Gazette and the Charleston State Gazette of South Carolina.

== See also ==
- Delaware Moors
- Naturalization Act of 1790
- Turks of South Carolina
