= St. Mark's Episcopal Church (Pinewood, South Carolina) =

Historic church in South Carolina, United States

- U.S. National Register of Historic Places
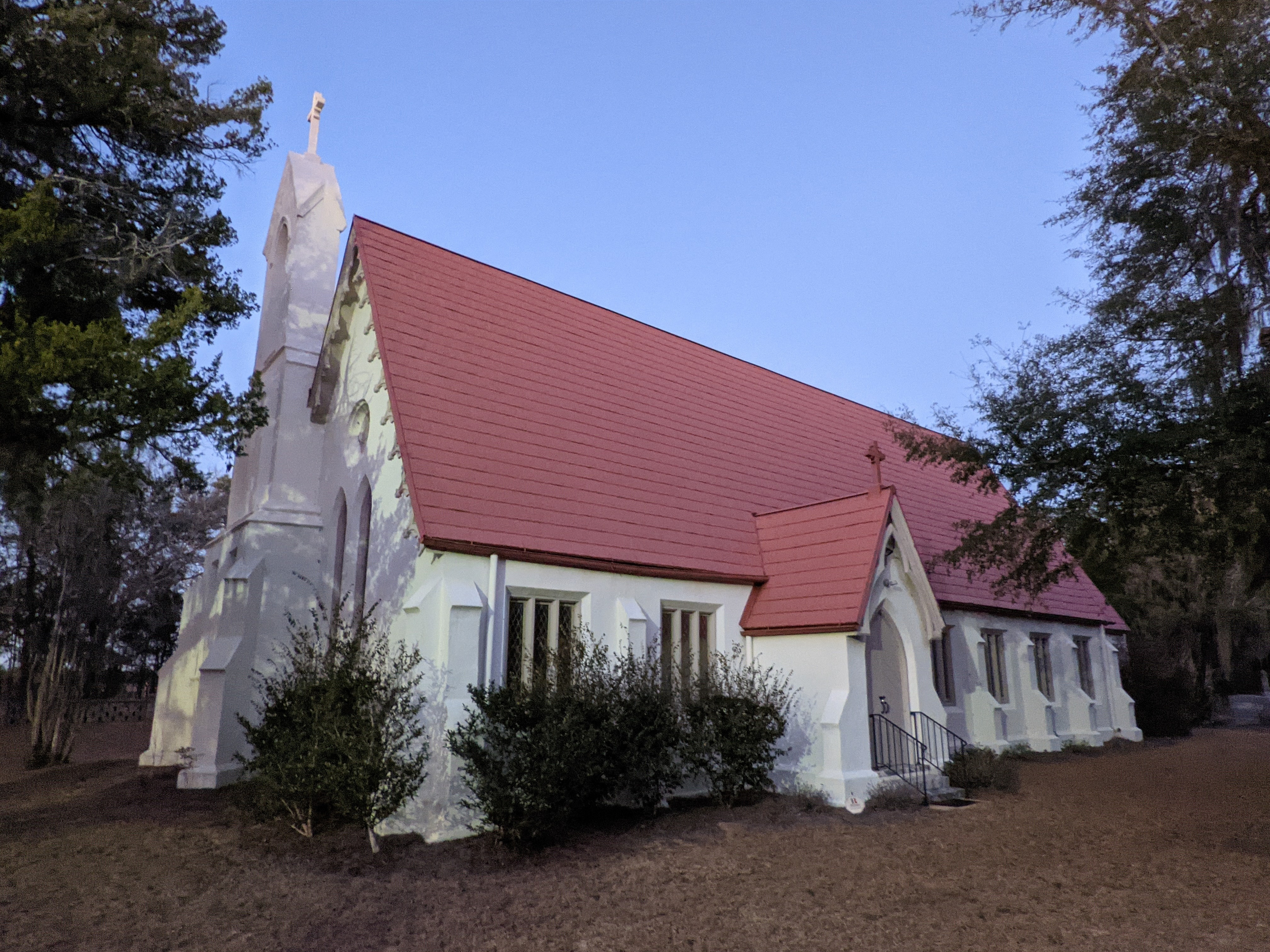

- Location within South Carolina Location within the United States
- Coordinates: 33°44′50″N 80°30′40″W
- Area: 2 acres (0.81 ha)
- Built: 1855
- Architect: Edward C. Jones; Francis D. Lee
- Architectural style: Gothic Revival
- NRHP reference No.: 78002530
- Added to NRHP: January 20, 1978

St. Mark's Episcopal Church is an historic Episcopal church located in the High Hills of Santee west of Pinewood, South Carolina. On January 20, 1978, it was added to the National Register of Historic Places as St. Mark's Church.

== History ==
St. Mark's Parish was established in 1767 by act of the South Carolina Assembly. The present church, built in 1855, is the fourth or fifth church erected by the parish but the first at this location, which was donated by the Richardson and Manning families. The church built in 1767 near Summerton was burned by the British during the American Revolution because of the patriotic activity of its then rector. At least six governors, three Richardsons and three Mannings, regularly attended services at St. Mark's either here or at previous locations. St. Mark's was the parish church for both the Manning family plantations, including Millford Plantation, and the Richardson family plantations, including Bloomhill Plantation.

== Cemetery ==
St. Mark's Cemetery is included in the historic place designation.

== Current use ==
St. Mark's Episcopal Church is no longer an active parish.

== See also ==
- List of Registered Historic Places in South Carolina
