= Ellerbe's Mill =

- U.S. National Register of Historic Places
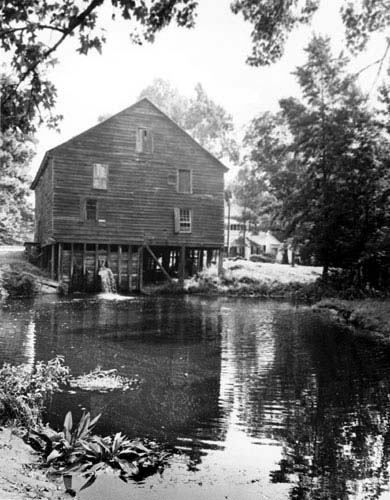

- Location within South Carolina Location within the United States
- Location: About 3 miles south of Rembert off U.S. Route 521 on Rafting Creek, near Rembert, South Carolina
- Coordinates: 34°04′10″N 80°31′50″W
- Area: 100 acres (40 ha)
- Built: c. 1830
- NRHP reference No.: 74001880
- Added to NRHP: November 20, 1974

Ellerbe's Mill, also known as Millvale, is a historic grist mill complex located near Rembert, Sumter County, South Carolina. The mill was built about 1830, and is a 2 1/2-story pine clapboard building mounted on wooden pilings situated on a 90-acre millpond. Also located on the property is the associated store (1910); the two-story, frame Victorian style main house (c. 1890); several tenant houses; and a dovecote.

It was added to the National Register of Historic Places in 1974.
