= Lenoir Store =

- U.S. National Register of Historic Places
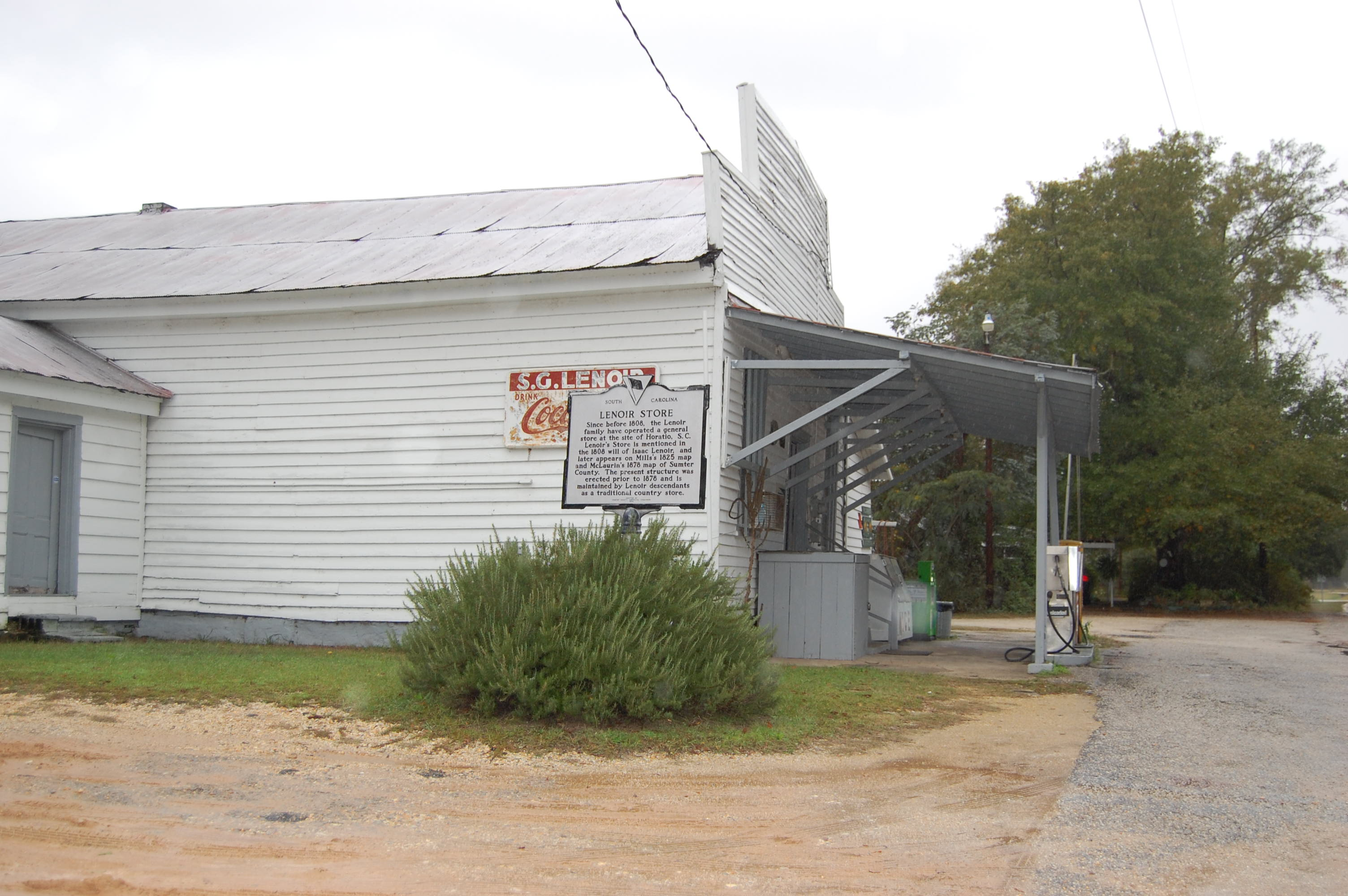

- Location within South Carolina Location within the United States
- Location: 3240 Horatio Road, Horatio, South Carolina
- Coordinates: 34°1′17.1″N 80°34′5.0″W
- Area: 1.2 acres (0.49 ha)
- Built: 1878
- Architectural style: wooden Vernacular architecture
- NRHP reference No.: 97000744
- Added to NRHP: July 3, 1997

The Lenoir Store built in 1869 is an American historic general store building located in the High Hills of Santee community of Horatio, South Carolina. It stands on the same site where the Lenoir family has operated a general store since before 1808 and "is the oldest business establishment in Sumter County". Since 1900 it has served as the post office for Horatio Zip Code 29062. On July 3, 1997, it was added to the National Register of Historic Places. As of that date, it was still being operated by members of the Lenoir family. Lenoir is pronounced le-nore or len-wa by some of its more northern members.

== See also ==
- List of Registered Historic Places in South Carolina
