= Manchester State Forest =

State forest in South Carolina, United States

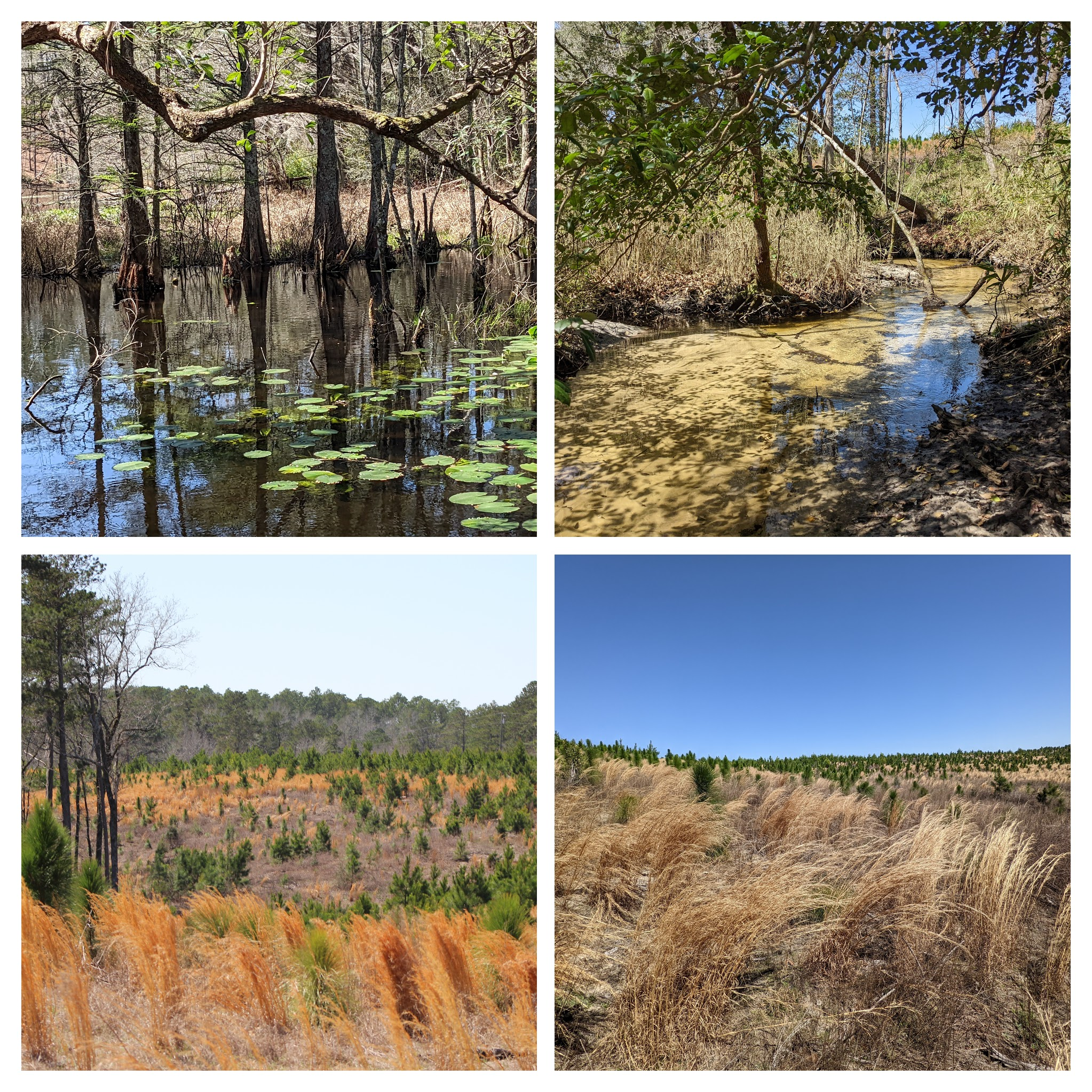
- Interactive map of Manchester State Forest
- Location: Clarendon County, South Carolina and Sumter County, South Carolina, United States
- Nearest city: Sumter, South Carolina
- Coordinates: 33°49′59″N 80°31′32″W
- Area: 28,675 acres (116.04 km^{2})
- Established: 1949
- Named for: Town of Manchester
- Governing body: South Carolina Forestry Commission

Manchester State Forest is a state forest in Clarendon County, South Carolina and Sumter County, South Carolina. Founded in 1949, the forest is named after the former site of Manchester, South Carolina, a once bustling town in the early 19th century.

== Geography ==
The forest is found in the High Hills of Santee region of central South Carolina and comprises 28,675 acres (11,600 ha) of woodland, meadowland, and bottomland located alongside the Wateree River watershed to the west, the unincorporated community of Wedgefield, South Carolina to the north, the city of Sumter, South Carolina to the east, and Pinewood, South Carolina to the south.

== Recreation ==
Besides timber production, the forest is a popular destination for mixed use recreation, including hunting, fishing, hiking, and horseback riding. 11.4 miles (18.35 km) of the High Hills of Santee section of the Palmetto Trail travels through the forest from Mill Creek Park north into Poinsett State Park.
