= Swan Lake Iris Gardens =

Public park in Sumter, South Carolina

- Location within South Carolina
- Location: Sumter, South Carolina
- Coordinates: 33.9195559°N 80.3707367°W
- Type: Pond
- Basin countries: United States

Swan Lake Iris Gardens is a public park located in Sumter, South Carolina. It is currently the only public park in the United States to have all eight species of swans—including Royal white mutes, Black Necks, Coscorobas, Whoopers, Black Australians, Whistlers, Bewicks, and Trumpeters.

== History ==
Beginning in 1927 as a private fishing lake for wealthy businessman Hamilton Carr Bland, who also began landscaping his garden with Japanese Iris flowers. The Irises failed and he ordered his gardener to dig them all up and throw them in the lake. However, the Irises bloomed the following spring and attracted attention from locals. In 1938, A.T. Heath, Sr. deeded 30 acres on the North Side of West Liberty Street to Bland with the stipulations that it would be developed into part of the gardens. The gardens were deeded to the City of Sumter, South Carolina, in 1949. Shortly after in 1950, Development started on the Braille garden and Butterfly Garden. In 1994, The McDuffie overpass was constructed on W. Liberty Street which connects the two gardens. The Heath Family donated the land behind the garden to the city, it opened as The Heath Pavilion in 2002. The Chocolate Garden, established in 2009, features edible plants such as Chocolate Cherry Tomatoes, Chocolate Corn and Chocolate Mini Bell Peppers as well as various flowers that have a chocolate smell and color including Chocolate Daisy, Chocolate Mint and Chocolate Cosmos.

On July 29, 2019, Swan Lake's main entrance closed for renovations. The new entrance opened in February 2020 and showcased a large 24-foot Grainger McKoy sculpture titled, Seven Swans. McKoy also created "Recovery", a sculpture located inside the park, in 2010.

== Iris Festival ==
The Iris Festival is a three day festival which includes a variety of things from food, music, vendors, arts & crafts, car shows, and a number of Children's activity's. The Festival is annually held in May. Until 2025 it was held Memorial Day Weekend and is one of the largest and longest continuous running festival in the Southeast. Most vendors, music, and food will be located inside the main entrance gate while several more vendors and activities can be found on the North side of the garden, across W. Liberty Street. The event is featured on the local news, as well as several magazines, major newspapers, televisions shows, and websites.

== Fantasy of Lights ==
The Fantasy of Lights is an annual Christmas event featuring over 1,000,000 Christmas Lights in various shapes and forms. The event takes place in the parks main parking lot and also lines West Liberty Street and features another Display on Garden Street. The Event is South Carolina's largest free Christmas Light Display.

== See also ==
- List of lakes in South Carolina

== Sources ==
- http://www.sumtersc.gov/swan-lake-iris-gardens.aspx
- http://scgreatoutdoors.com/park-swan.html
