= Hagood, South Carolina =

Unincorporated community in Sumter County, SC

Coordinates: 34°03′26″N 80°34′18″W

- unincorporated community
- Interactive map of Hagood, South Carolina
- Country: United States
- State: South Carolina
- County: Sumter
- Time zone: UTC-5 (Eastern (EST))
  - Summer (DST): UTC-4 (EDT)

Hagood is an unincorporated community in the High Hills of Santee area in western Sumter County, South Carolina, United States. It lies west of South Carolina Highway 261, north of Stateburg and is the location of Magnolia Hall, which is listed on the National Register of Historic Places. Its mail now comes from Rembert zip code 29128. The community was originally called Sander's Station by the South Carolina Railway, apparently for Dr. Swepson Saunders, the owner of Magnolia Hall plantation, on which it was located, but was renamed Hagood for Johnson Hagood, brigadier general in the Confederate States Army and later governor of South Carolina.
