= Turks of South Carolina =

Group living in South Carolina, US

Turkish; "The Turkish People"
- Kenneth Benenhaley, an employee at Shaw Air Force Base, described in contemporary publicity as a "Typical Turk," c. 1957.

Total population
- c. 400; Descendants of Joseph Benenhaley (Yusuf ben Ali)

Regions with significant populations
- Dalzell in Sumter; South Carolina

Languages
- English (Southern American English)

Religion
- Christianity (Baptist)

Related ethnic groups
- Other Turkish Americans, Middle Eastern Americans, North African Americans, Lumbee

The Turks of South Carolina, also known as Turks of Sumter County or Sumter Turks, are a mixed-ancestry group descended from a Middle Eastern or North African ancestor from the Ottoman Empire, whose members have lived in northern Sumter County, South Carolina, since the late 18th century and identify as Turkish Americans. In local usage, the term "Turk" has historically been employed in a pejorative manner and is considered derogatory by many within the community, who today prefer to be referred to as "Turkish" or "the Turkish people." As of 2018, they numbered no more than 400 in the town of Dalzell, with a slight majority carrying the surname Benenhaley. According to former U.S. Representative Glen Browder, "they have always been a tight-knit and isolated community of people who identified as being of Turkish descent".

In 2013, the South Carolina Commission for Minority Affairs state-recognized the Sumter Tribe of Cheraw Indians, whose membership wholly descends from the Turks of South Carolina, and obtained status as a Native American tribe through use of their communal history and genealogy. The decision generated controversy within the Turkish community in Sumter, whose members have maintained that their ancestors only identified as Turkish rather than as Native Americans. Browder, along with members of the Turkish community conducted an academic study of the group's MENA origins, and in 2019, following the publication of their findings, the State of South Carolina amended state documentation to acknowledge the history and heritage of the Turks of South Carolina as Turkish Americans. As of 2026, the Sumter Tribe of Cheraw Indians remains a state-recognized tribe in South Carolina, a status they obtained prior to the "Turk-Indian" controversy.

== History ==
The Turkish community traces its history back to an early settler from the Ottoman Empire, Joseph Benenhaley, who served the colonial cause in the American Revolutionary War. It has been traditionally speculated that Benenhaley's name was Anglicized from an Arabic name, Yusuf ben Ali. After the war, General Thomas Sumter awarded Benenhaley land on his plantation to farm and raise a family for his service. A few outsiders married into the family, but most who identified with the ostracized community, and their progeny considered themselves people of Turkish descent. By the mid-20th century, they numbered several hundred. In the 21st century, while aiming to evidence the Ottoman origins of Benenhaley, researchers located an 1815 plat signed by Sumter that labels "Joseph's Land" in the area where Benenhaley is believed to have settled, and where many in the Turkish community continue to live today. Researchers also discovered a letter written by a woman born in the 1840s, who was acquainted with the Sumter and Benenhaley families. The letter refers to the community's founder, Joseph Benenhaley, as "an Ottoman bonded by the Spanish at sea" that worked as a wheelwright for Sumter during the American Revolutionary War in exchange for a homestead. Generations later, a great-grandson recollected Benenhaley as a "Caucasian of 'Arab' descent".

The family of Noah and Rosa Benenhaley, 1903.

=== Discrimination ===
The community's heritage has reflected their long experience of isolation and discrimination in rural South Carolina. Due to segregation policies in the past, there were "Turkish schools, Turkish school buses, and Turkish cinemas in this period." Community members were reportedly assigned "Turkish hospital beds" and permitted to vote during the Jim Crow era based on their classification as "Caucasian." Historically, they have identified as "Turks" or "white Turk-Americans" and describe themselves as a form of "white folk." Accounts have also documented racial prejudices among some older Turkish people, including opposition to interracial relationships with African Americans.

In 2026, a historical marker was erected at the former Dalzell School, which was established to serve members of the community. In 1930, all Turkish students attended the school. A new three-classroom building was constructed between 1935–1936 with support from the New Deal and staffed by white teachers. In 1950, Turkish families successfully sued for admission to local high schools, gaining access to white schools prior to school integration in the United States. White elementary schools began admitting Turkish children in 1961, following some opposition. The Dalzell School subsequently closed.

=== Visit of Muhittin Güven ===
In 1963, Muhittin Güven, a native of Istanbul and member of Turkey's Justice Party in the Grand National Assembly of Turkey, former Minister of Housing, and chairman of the Istanbul Architecture Association, visited Sumter County as part of the U.S. Department of State’s Foreign Leader Exchange Program. His itinerary, arranged in consultation with the Governmental Affairs Institute in Washington, D.C., included a visit to the Turks of Sumter, whom The Sumter Item described as a "Turkish-American descendant community".

During the visit, Güven and his interpreter, Kenan Taşpınar, met with Julius Benenhaley, a leader within the community, along with several other members for historical purposes. The meeting took place at Long Branch Baptist Church, located near Shaw Air Force Base. According to contemporary publications, the discussion included references to "the Old Country".

Writing in The New Yorker in 1969, journalist Calvin Trillin reported that a representative of the Sumter County Chamber of Commerce remarked that they took a photograph of Güven and Benenhaley and believed "they could have passed for brothers." According to the same account, Güven and Taşpınar commented that members of the Sumter Turkish community resembled people from various parts of the Mediterranean. Trillin reported that "Guven thought [the] Turks might have originally been Maltese," while Taşpınar believed they "could have been North Africans who were part of the Ottoman Empire." According to Trillin, Benenhaley himself expressed pride in the community's traditions of Turkish ancestry, stating, "I’m proud of my Turkish blood…That’s why I was proud to meet that man who came all the way from Turkey."

== Genetic studies ==
DNA analysis on living members of the Turkish community descended from Joseph Benenhaley showed significant genetic connections to the regions of the Mediterranean, Middle East, and North Africa, along with substantial Western European admixture and some potential evidence of Native American linkages. Reportedly, the DNA results showed no discernible contributions from Sub-Saharan Africa, contradicting criticism that the community had claimed Turkish ancestry to cover West African heritage.

== Misrepresentations ==
Dr. Terri Ann Ognibene, a "Sumter Turk" herself, has discussed the misrepresentations of the community:

We are the Turkish people of Sumter County, in the state of South Carolina. Our story has never been told fully and accurately. We have roots that extend all the way back to the Revolutionary War. We fought in the Civil War and in the World Wars I and II. But for centuries our rich history has been overlooked and misrepresented, our cultural identity questioned, and we were denied equal access to education because of the tones of our skin. We persevered, and we prevailed. Now, though our spirit endures, the Turkish community faces new and different challenges as a fading ethnicity in the twenty-first century.

=== Conflation with Free Moors ===
In the early 20th century, some believed that they were of primarily Native American background, with some admixture of Turkish. They have been mistakenly connected to a family of "Free Moors" who resided in Charleston (see Moors Sundry Act of 1790).

=== The Turk-Indian controversy ===
In the early 21st century, a small group within the Sumter Turkish community, including a brother and sister, rejected the label "Sumter Turks" and instead identified as Cheraw, citing descent from the Oxendine family. The surname Oxendine is widely recognized as one of the core family names historically associated with the Lumbee. Other members have rejected this identification. Brian Benenhaley, a corporate lawyer in Columbia, South Carolina, and descendant of Joseph Benenhaley, stated, “We never lived as American Indians.”

The Sumter Cheraw maintained that the Turks of South Carolina descended from Native Americans invited to Dalzell, South Carolina by Thomas Sumter following Joseph Benenhaley's service in the American Revolutionary War, and that the community later became known as "Turks" due to Benenhaley's purported Turkish ancestry. In 2013, the Sumter Tribe of Cheraw Indians was granted state-recognition by the South Carolina Commission for Minority Affairs after submitting several petitions during the preceding decade, one of which had previously been denied. Research subsequently conducted by Glen Browder at the office of the South Carolina Commission for Minority Affairs in Columbia, South Carolina concluded that the Turks of Sumter and the historic American Indian group in Sumter represented two distinct communities with separate progenitors, though some Native American ancestry may have entered the Turkish community through the Oxendine family, or other families, whose members intermarried into the Turkish population during the nineteenth century and adopted Turkish identity.

Browder interviewed members of Turkish families in Sumter while researching the origins of the community. When asked about the ethnic background of the Sumter Turks, one respondent stated that he did not believe the Turkish people were Native American, though he acknowledged that Native Americans had married into the community and that, through intermarriage, some individuals possessed Native American ancestry. He explained:

In my opinion a very small percentage consider themselves Indian, and they are primarily of the younger generation (under fifty). Most of the older generation know their history. They know that the early Oxendines were Lumbee Indians from North Carolina and that Lumbee Oxendines married into the Benenhaleys—that is a fact. But their intermarriage only added another element of ethnic diversity to the community—just like the first intermarriages by the whites and others."

Disagreements between community members who continue to identify as Turkish and those who have more recently identified as Cheraw have led to online and public disputes. During a speaker event concerning the community’s history at a local museum, organizers had to request a police presence. Browder and other researchers have disputed the classification of the Sumter Turks as Melungeons or as members of other historic racial isolate communities, based on their historical findings.

== Culture and traditions ==
=== Surnames ===
In the 1950s, Ann King Gregorie reported that surnames common among the Sumter Turks included Benenhaley, Oxendine, Scott, Hood, Buckner, Lowery, Chavis, and Ray. Subsequent genealogical and census research has indicated that approximately a dozen individuals bearing the surname Oxendine, most of them women, married into the Turkish community, along with a smaller number of individuals associated with Native American ancestry, including persons with the surnames Scott, Buckner, Lowrey, and Deas during the nineteenth century. Writing in the mid-1970s, scholar Wesley D. White reported on behalf of the Smithsonian Institution that the Oxendines and others had merged into the Turkish community and suggested they were likely contributors to what he termed speculated "Indian ancestry" within the group, although he noted that they held "no tradition whatever of Indian ancestry" and traced their origins to "founders of the community from Turkey" and called themselves "Turks" or "white Turk-Americans".

=== Marriages patterns ===
The Turkish community of Sumter has traditionally been described as "cautious about outside society," with relatively few outsiders historically accepted into the group. Unwritten social customs governed community life, and the Turks of Sumter practiced endogamy, similar to other ethnic groups, including various Arab tribes of the Middle East. The relatively small size of the community contributed to the repeated appearance of the same family surnames across generations. This pattern of intermarriage shaped the group's reputation among outsiders while reinforcing shared ethnic traits and a sense of Turkish identity. In recent decades, however, assimilation into broader society has reduced this social stigma, and many descendants of the community now marry outside the traditional group.

=== Language ===
Due to the historic isolation of their community, older Sumter Turks traditionally speak a dialect of Southern American English that has been compared by its speakers to Cajun English or New Orleans English and is reportedly difficult for outsiders to understand.

== Assimilation ==
In their study on the Sumter Turks, Dr. Terri Ann Ognibene and Professor Glen Browder said the following regarding identity and assimilation:

Our investigation has documented that the community of mainly dark-skinned people was founded by the Ottoman Turk, and it was nurtured by a nexus of patriarchy, blood, marriage, color, isolation, discrimination, and identity. The Benenhaleys began their secluded existence at the beginning of the 1800s and others joined them over the years. These huddled families—mainly the Benenhaleys, Oxendines, Rays, Hoods, Buckners, and Lowreys—assumed a common identity as an outcast group, and they kept to themselves for many generations in rural South Carolina. The Turkish people neither blended openly and prominently into mainstream society nor dissipated in the shadows as scattered refugees. They sustained themselves as the single clear case of an ethnic community that went its own separate way toward cultural isolation for almost two centuries. The community numbered about five hundred at its peak in the mid-twentieth century; and only in the past few decades have they begun assimilating into broader society.

== See also ==
- Turkish diaspora
- Turkish Americans
- Ottoman Turks
- Ibrahim Ben Ali, early Ottoman Turkish settler in the US
- Marie Tepe, 19th-century settler to the US of Turkish origin who fought for the Union army during the American Civil War
- Sumter Tribe of Cheraw Indians, a state-recognized tribe whose membership descends from the Turks of South Carolina
