= Orange Grove (Dalzell, South Carolina) =

Historic house in South Carolina, United States

- 'Orange Grove'
- U.S. National Register of Historic Places
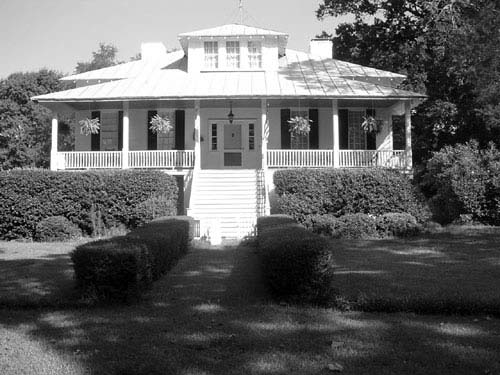
- Orange Grove façade

- Location within South Carolina
- Nearest city: Dalzell, South Carolina
- Coordinates: 34°2′42″N 80°26′10″W
- Area: 39.9 acres (16.1 ha)
- Built: 1851, 1924
- Architectural style: Raised Cottage
- NRHP reference No.: 93000845
- Added to NRHP: August 19, 1993

Orange Grove, also known as the Gaillard-Colclough House, is an historic 39.9-acre (161,000 m^{2}) plantation and its plantation house at Gaillard's Crossroads, (intersection of Peach Orchard Road and Black River Road), north of Dalzell, South Carolina. It was added to the National Register of Historic Places on August 19, 1993.

Originally built in 1851 in a South Carolina Lowcountry vernacular style of architecture, the house was seriously damaged by a tornado on April 30, 1924, and was rebuilt so that it now appears as a "raised cottage with a Prairie or Craftsman roof."

The plantation house's main axis runs NW-SE, with the façade on the SE face.
