= Horatio, South Carolina =

Coordinates: 34°01′17″N 80°33′57″W

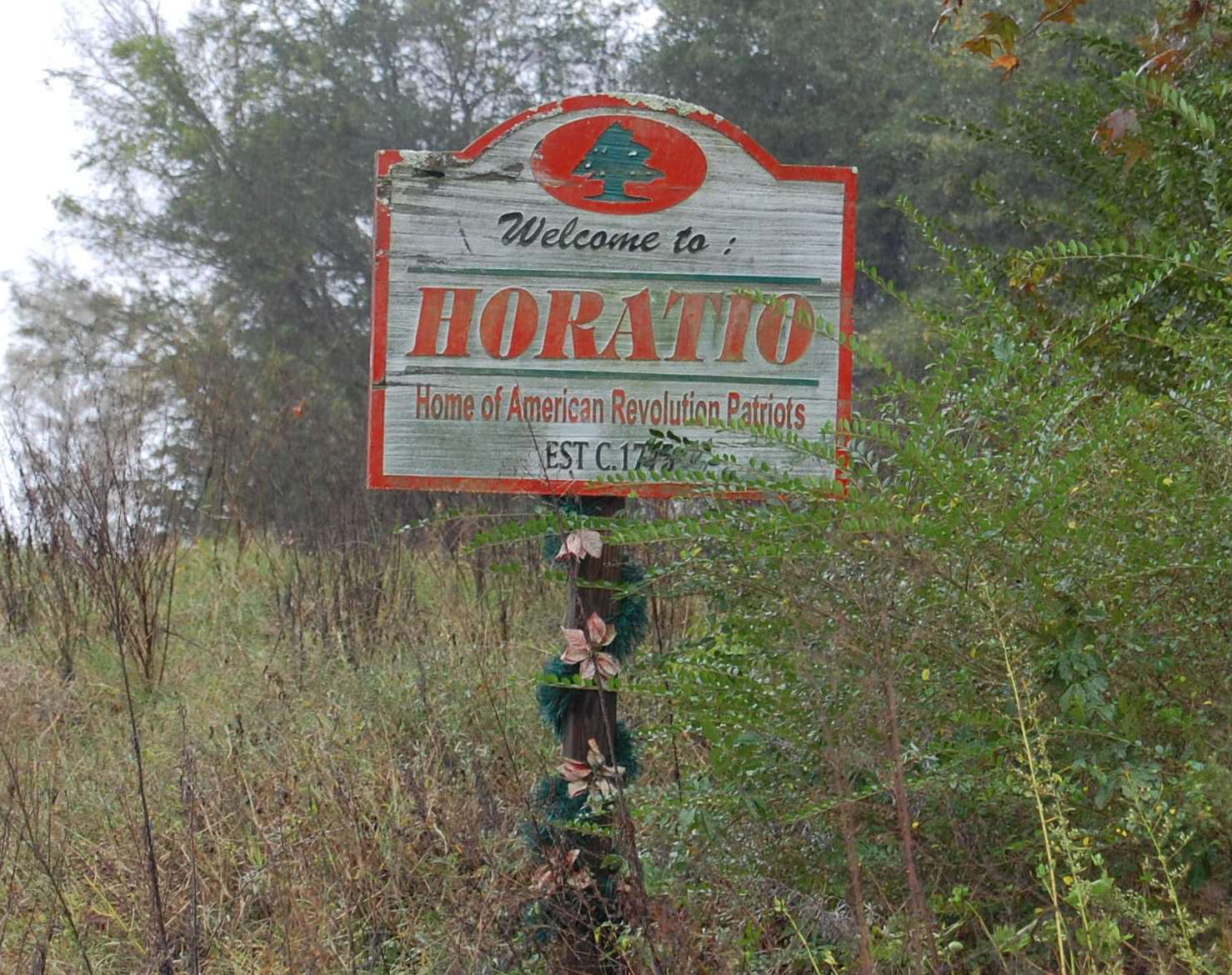
- Sign in Horatio
- Interactive map of Horatio, South Carolina
- Country: United States
- State: South Carolina
- County: Sumter
- Time zone: UTC-5 (Eastern (EST))
  - Summer (DST): UTC-4 (EDT)
- Zip Code: 29062

Horatio is an unincorporated community in the High Hills of Santee area in western Sumter County, South Carolina, United States.

It lies on Horatio Road west of South Carolina Highway 261 north of Stateburg and is the location of the Lenoir Store, which is listed on the National Register of Historic Places. The Horatio post office, zip code 29062, is located inside the Lenoir Store at 3240 Horatio Road. The community was originally called Louellen, but was renamed Horatio for Horatio Lenoir.

== Notable person ==
- Sloman Moody
