= Grainger McKoy =

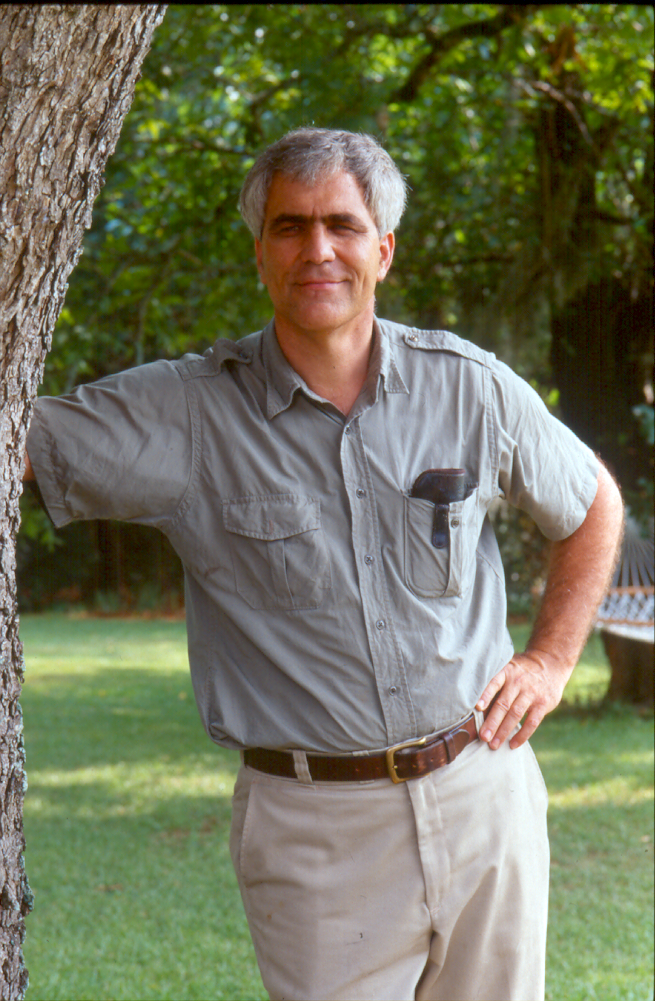
McKoy in 2015

Grainger McKoy (born in 1947) is an artist known for depicting birds and their behavior. He is best known for his wooden sculptures but also produces jewelry and gifts.

== History ==
Victor Grainger McKoy was born in North Carolina in 1947. After receiving an antique duck decoy from his grandmother as a child, McKoy carved his first bird out of wood. It was a shorebird carved from cypress wood. He graduated from Edmunds High School (now Sumter High School) in 1965. He then attended Clemson University in South Carolina and pursued a bachelor's degree in architecture before earning a zoology degree. After college, he took an apprenticeship under the bird carver Gilbert Maggioni.

Once McKoy learned how to mold bronze and gold, he expanded his repertoire into steel, bronze, sterling silver, gold, and platinum. For these, he first carves into wood and then uses a lost-wax cast to produce metal pieces. He subsequently began creating smaller sculptures and casting them into jewelry for his wife.

In 2010, a public park called Swan Lake Iris Gardens in Sumter, South Carolina, commissioned Grainger Mckoy to create an outdoor installation. Recovery is a stainless-steel statue representing the wing of a pintail duck in flight.

From September 2011 through January 2012, the High Museum of Art in Atlanta housed a Grainger McKoy exhibit, showcasing over 30 of his sculptures and drawings. The museum said that McKoy's sculptures "grip the observant viewer with trompe l'oeil illusion, while rejecting the confounding trickery often implicit in that 'trick of the eye' style. Rather McKoy invites us to question, wonder, observe, and above all, revel in the pure beauty of his birds."
