= Rembert, South Carolina =

- Unincorporated community Census designated place
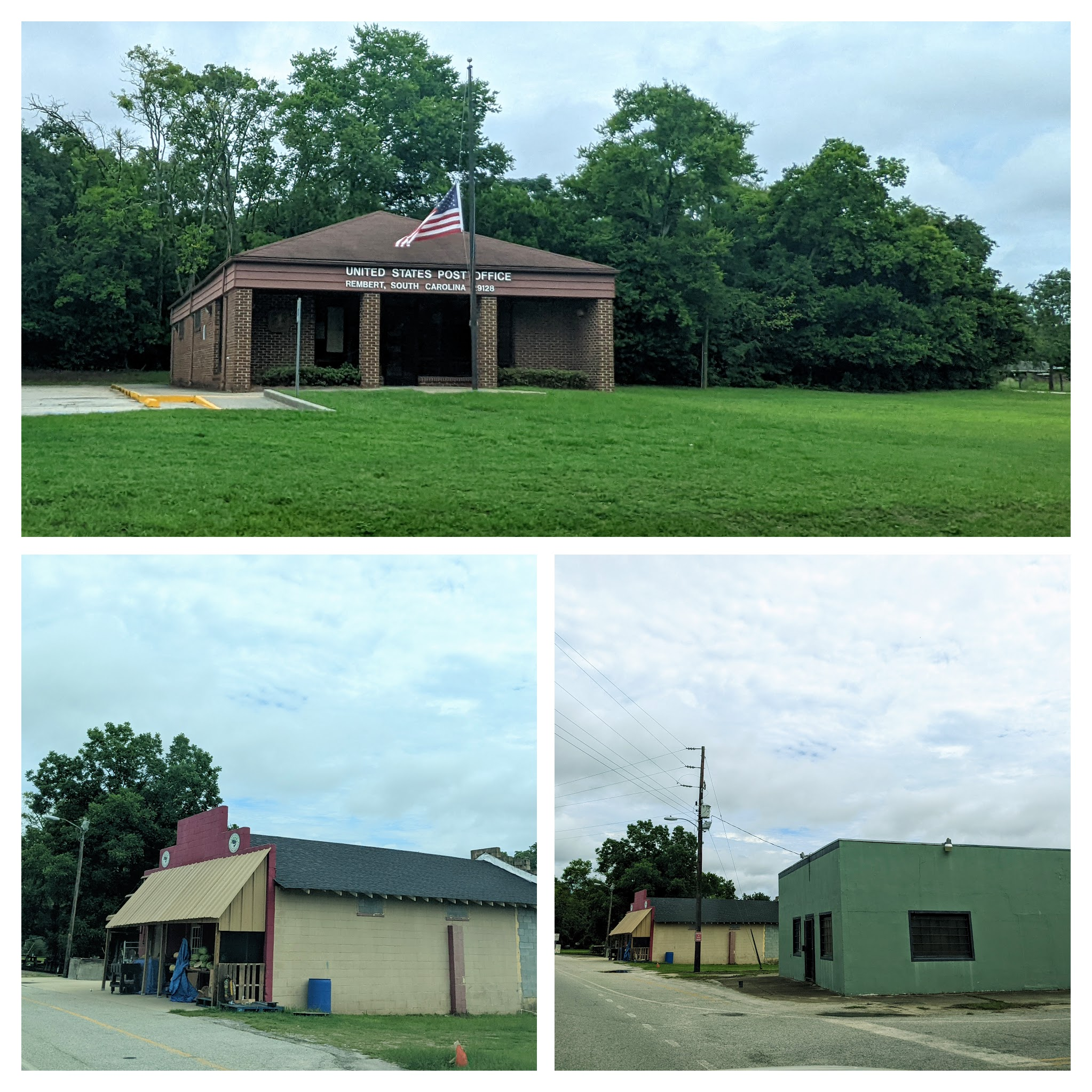
- Buildings in Rembert

- Location within the state of South Carolina
- Coordinates: 34°06′13″N 80°31′50″W
- Country: United States
- State: South Carolina
- County: Sumter

Area
  - Total: 3.84 sq mi (9.94 km^{2})
  - Land: 3.84 sq mi (9.94 km^{2})
  - Water: 0 sq mi (0.00 km^{2})
- Elevation: 282 ft (86 m)

Population (2020)
  - Total: 246
  - Density: 64.1/sq mi (24.76/km^{2})
- Time zone: UTC-5 (Eastern (EST))
  - Summer (DST): UTC-4 (EDT)
- ZIP Code: 29128
- Area codes: 803 and 839
- FIPS code: 45-59470
- GNIS feature ID: 2403470

Rembert is an unincorporated community and census designated place (CDP) in Sumter County, South Carolina, United States. The population was 306 at the 2010 census, a decline from 406 in 2000. It is included in the Sumter, South Carolina Metropolitan Statistical Area.

== History ==
Ellerbe's Mill was listed on the National Register of Historic Places in 1974.

== Geography ==
According to the United States Census Bureau, the CDP has a total area of 4.4 square miles (11.4 km^{2}), all land. It is named after Huguenot Frenchman, Andre Rembert (1661–1736), immigrant to South Carolina.

== Demographics ==
Historical population
Census	Pop.	Note	%±
2000	406		—
2010	306		−24.6%
2020	246		−19.6%
U.S. Decennial Census

=== 2020 census ===
Rembert CDP, South Carolina – Racial and ethnic composition Note: the US Census treats Hispanic/Latino as an ethnic category. This table excludes Latinos from the racial categories and assigns them to a separate category. Hispanics/Latinos may be of any race.
Race / Ethnicity (NH = Non-Hispanic)	Pop 2000	Pop 2010	Pop 2020	% 2000	% 2010	% 2020
White alone (NH)	98	72	58	24.14%	23.53%	23.58%
Black or African American alone (NH)	302	201	145	74.38%	65.69%	58.94%
Native American or Alaska Native alone (NH)	0	1	0	0.00%	0.33%	0.00%
Asian alone (NH)	0	0	0	0.00%	0.00%	0.00%
Native Hawaiian or Pacific Islander alone (NH)	0	0	1	0.00%	0.00%	0.41%
Other race alone (NH)	0	0	1	0.00%	0.00%	0.41%
Mixed race or Multiracial (NH)	0	10	5	0.00%	3.27%	2.03%
Hispanic or Latino (any race)	6	22	36	1.48%	7.19%	14.63%
Total	406	306	246	100.00%	100.00%	100.00%

=== 2000 census ===
As of the census of 2000, there were 406 people, 144 households, and 101 families residing in the CDP. The population density was 92.1 inhabitants per square mile (35.6/km^{2}). There were 163 housing units at an average density of 37.0 per square mile (14.3/km^{2}). The racial makeup of the CDP was 24.14% White, 75.62% African American, 0.25% from other races. Hispanic or Latino of any race were 1.48% of the population.

There were 144 households, out of which 32.6% had children under the age of 18 living with them, 37.5% were married couples living together, 25.0% had a female householder with no husband present, and 29.2% were non-families. 24.3% of all households were made up of individuals, and 6.9% had someone living alone who was 65 years of age or older. The average household size was 2.82 and the average family size was 3.42.

In the CDP, the population was spread out, with 33.5% under the age of 18, 9.4% from 18 to 24, 26.6% from 25 to 44, 18.5% from 45 to 64, and 12.1% who were 65 years of age or older. The median age was 33 years. For every 100 females, there were 82.9 males. For every 100 females age 18 and over, there were 75.3 males.

The median income for a household in the CDP was $18,958, and the median income for a family was $25,417. Males had a median income of $19,911 versus $16,875 for females. The per capita income for the CDP was $9,528. About 26.5% of families and 30.8% of the population were below the poverty line, including 44.2% of those under age 18 and 51.3% of those age 65 or over.
