= Dalzell, South Carolina =

- CDP
- Nickname: Razzle Dazzle
- Location within the state of South Carolina
- Coordinates: 34°01′02″N 80°25′27″W
- Country: United States
- State: South Carolina
- County: Sumter

Area
  - Total: 5.90 sq mi (15.27 km^{2})
  - Land: 5.85 sq mi (15.14 km^{2})
  - Water: 0.046 sq mi (0.12 km^{2})
- Elevation: 223 ft (68 m)

Population (2020)
  - Total: 3,175
  - Density: 543.0/sq mi (209.64/km^{2})
- Time zone: UTC-5 (Eastern (EST))
  - Summer (DST): UTC-4 (EDT)
- ZIP code: 29040
- Area codes: 803, 839
- FIPS code: 45-18430
- GNIS feature ID: 2402399

Dalzell is a census-designated place (CDP) in Sumter County, South Carolina, United States. The population was 3,175 at the 2020 census. It is included in the Sumter, South Carolina Metropolitan Statistical Area.

== History ==
Orange Grove and St. Philip's Episcopal Church, Bradford Springs are listed on the National Register of Historic Places.

== Geography ==
According to the United States Census Bureau, the CDP has a total area of 6.9 square miles (18 km^{2}), of which 6.8 square miles (18 km^{2}) is land and 0.1 square miles (0.26 km^{2}) (0.72%) is water.

== Demographics ==
Historical population
Census	Pop.	Note	%±
2020	3,175		—
U.S. Decennial Census

=== 2020 census ===
As of the 2020 census, Dalzell had a population of 3,175. The median age was 33.7 years. 26.2% of residents were under the age of 18 and 10.0% of residents were 65 years of age or older. For every 100 females there were 89.9 males, and for every 100 females age 18 and over there were 87.6 males age 18 and over.

0.0% of residents lived in urban areas, while 100.0% lived in rural areas.

There were 1,259 households in Dalzell, of which 32.7% had children under the age of 18 living in them. Of all households, 40.3% were married-couple households, 18.3% were households with a male householder and no spouse or partner present, and 34.2% were households with a female householder and no spouse or partner present. About 27.8% of all households were made up of individuals and 10.2% had someone living alone who was 65 years of age or older.

There were 1,328 housing units, of which 5.2% were vacant. The homeowner vacancy rate was 1.0% and the rental vacancy rate was 1.9%.

Racial composition as of the 2020 census
Race	Number	Percent
White	1,383	43.6%
Black or African American	1,474	46.4%
American Indian and Alaska Native	12	0.4%
Asian	43	1.4%
Native Hawaiian and Other Pacific Islander	4	0.1%
Some other race	49	1.5%
Two or more races	210	6.6%
Hispanic or Latino (of any race)	103	3.2%

=== 2000 census ===
As of the 2000 census, there were 2,260 people, 805 households, and 622 families residing in the CDP. The population density was 329.7 inhabitants per square mile (127.3/km^{2}). There were 895 housing units at an average density of 130.6 per square mile (50.4/km^{2}). The racial makeup of the CDP was 61.11% Caucasian, 33.98% African American, 0.53% Native American, 1.11% Asian, 0.04% Pacific Islander, 1.46% from other races, and 1.77% from two or more races. Hispanic or Latino of any race were 3.27% of the population. A number of inhabitants claim heritage as Turks of South Carolina, descended from Joseph Benenhaley, an 18th-century Ottoman settler.

There were 805 households, out of which 45.1% had children under the age of 18 living with them, 56.0% were married couples living together, 16.4% had a female householder with no husband present, and 22.7% were non-families. 19.1% of all households were made up of individuals, and 5.1% had someone living alone who was 65 years of age or older. The average household size was 2.81 and the average family size was 3.20.

In the CDP, the population was spread out, with 32.5% under the age of 18, 8.9% from 18 to 24, 34.5% from 25 to 44, 17.7% from 45 to 64, and 6.5% who were 65 years of age or older. The median age was 30 years. For every 100 females, there were 94.8 males. For every 100 females age 18 and over, there were 91.9 males.

The median income for a household in the CDP was $40,750, and the median income for a family was $41,979. Males had a median income of $29,006 versus $22,000 for females. The per capita income for the CDP was $15,124. About 12.0% of families and 14.9% of the population were below the poverty line, including 24.3% of those under age 18 and 4.0% of those age 65 or over.

== Education ==
All areas in the county are in the Sumter County Consolidated School District.

== Notable people ==
- Ray Allen - NBA player and member of the Naismith Memorial Basketball Hall of Fame
- Joseph (Jusef Ben Ali) Benenhaley (1753-1823) was the progenitor of the Turkish Community of Sumter.
- Ja Morant - All Star Guard for the Memphis Grizzlies, selected as the second overall pick in the 2019 NBA draft.
- Bill Pinkney - American singer and original member of The Drifters most known for his rendition of "White Christmas."
