= Millwood, South Carolina =

- CDP
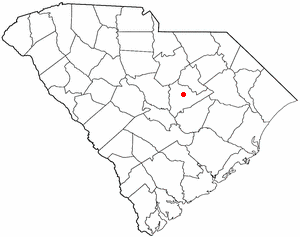
- Location of Millwood, South Carolina
- Coordinates: 33°54′46″N 80°23′41″W
- Country: United States
- State: South Carolina
- County: Sumter

Area
  - Total: 0.81 sq mi (2.1 km^{2})
  - Land: 0.81 sq mi (2.1 km^{2})
  - Water: 0.039 sq mi (0.1 km^{2})
- Elevation: 180 ft (55 m)

Population (2000)
  - Total: 885
  - Density: 1,112/sq mi (429.3/km^{2})
- Time zone: UTC-5 (Eastern (EST))
  - Summer (DST): UTC-4 (EDT)
- FIPS code: 45-46735
- GNIS feature ID: 2403293

Millwood is a census-designated place (CDP) in Sumter County, South Carolina, United States. The population was 885 at the 2000 census. It is included in the Sumter, South Carolina Metropolitan Statistical Area.

== Geography ==
According to the United States Census Bureau, the CDP has a total area of 0.8 square miles (2.1 km^{2}), of which 0.8 square miles (2.1 km^{2}) is land and 0.04 square miles (0.10 km^{2}) (3.61%) is water.

== Demographics ==
As of the census of 2000, there were 885 people, 329 households, and 274 families residing in the CDP. The population density was 1,111.9 inhabitants per square mile (429.3/km^{2}). There were 341 housing units at an average density of 428.4 per square mile (165.4/km^{2}). The racial makeup of the CDP was 76.05% White, 21.47% African American, 0.45% Native American, 0.68% Asian, 0.45% from other races, and 0.90% from two or more races. Hispanic or Latino of any race were 0.79% of the population.

There were 329 households, out of which 35.0% had children under the age of 18 living with them, 66.6% were married couples living together, 12.2% had a female householder with no husband present, and 16.7% were non-families. 14.3% of all households were made up of individuals, and 6.1% had someone living alone who was 65 years of age or older. The average household size was 2.67 and the average family size was 2.91.

In the CDP, the population was spread out, with 26.0% under the age of 18, 6.0% from 18 to 24, 22.9% from 25 to 44, 30.8% from 45 to 64, and 14.2% who were 65 years of age or older. The median age was 40 years. For every 100 females, there were 96.2 males. For every 100 females age 18 and over, there were 93.2 males.

The median income for a household in the CDP was $51,250, and the median income for a family was $59,375. Males had a median income of $27,716 versus $23,864 for females. The per capita income for the CDP was $21,426. None of the families and 1.0% of the population were living below the poverty line, including no under eighteens and none of those over 64.
