= Pinewood, South Carolina =

- Town
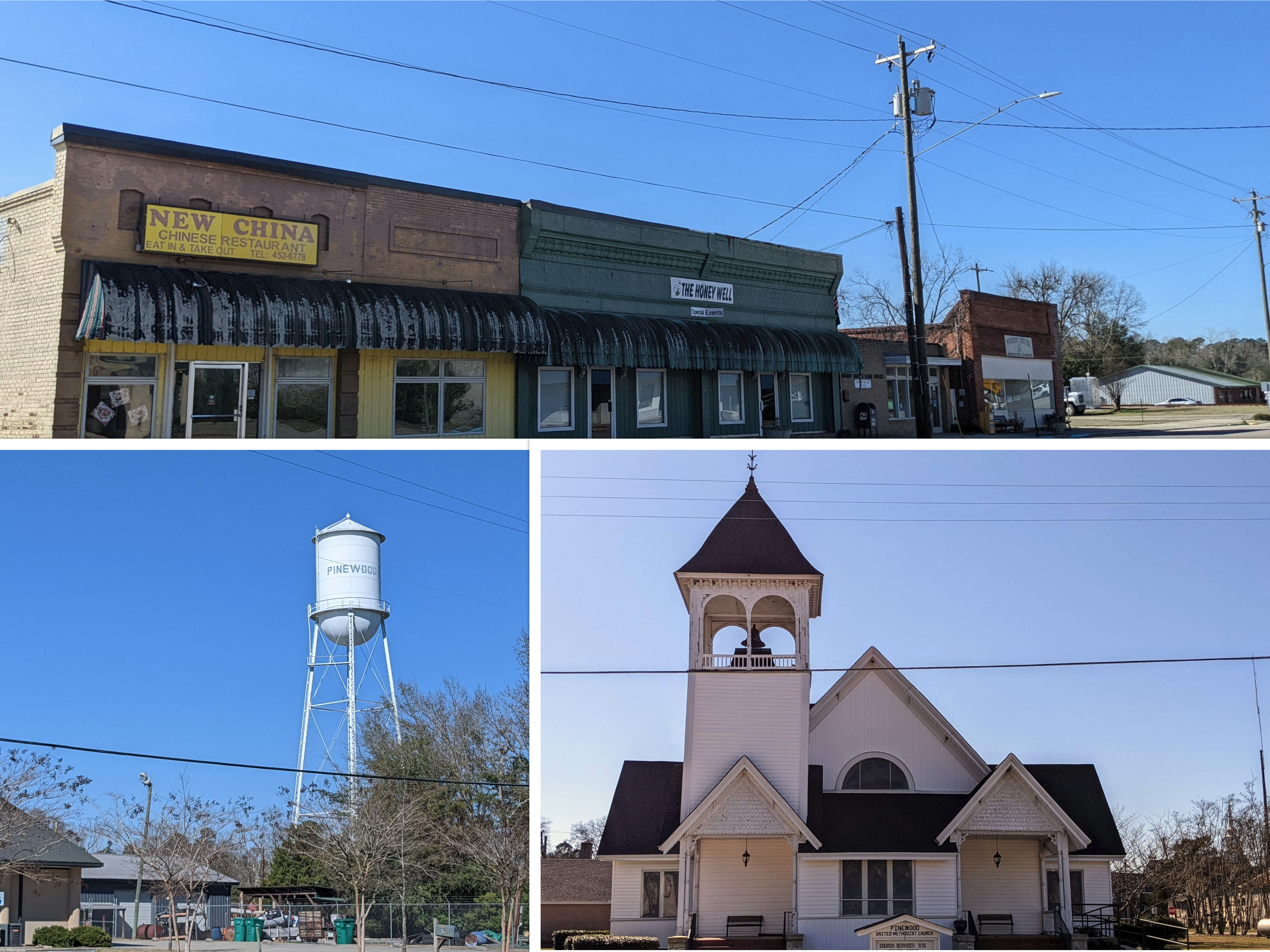
- Scenes in Pinewood

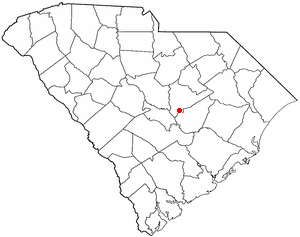
- Location of Pinewood, South Carolina
- Coordinates: 33°44′23″N 80°27′43″W
- Country: United States
- State: South Carolina
- County: Sumter

Area
  - Total: 1.07 sq mi (2.77 km^{2})
  - Land: 1.07 sq mi (2.77 km^{2})
  - Water: 0 sq mi (0.00 km^{2})
- Elevation: 190 ft (58 m)

Population (2020)
  - Total: 503
  - Density: 469.7/sq mi (181.35/km^{2})
- Time zone: UTC-5 (Eastern (EST))
  - Summer (DST): UTC-4 (EDT)
- ZIP code: 29125
- Area codes: 803 and 839
- FIPS code: 45-57085
- GNIS feature ID: 2407126

Pinewood is a town located on South Carolina Highway 261 at the southern entrance to the High Hills of Santee in Sumter County, South Carolina, United States. As of the 2020 census, Pinewood had a population of 503. It is included in the Sumter, South Carolina Metropolitan Statistical Area.

== History ==
Millford Plantation, Pinewood Depot, and St. Mark's Episcopal Church are listed on the National Register of Historic Places.

== Geography ==
According to the United States Census Bureau, the town has a total area of 1.1 square miles (2.8 km^{2}), all land.

== Demographics ==
Historical population
Census	Pop.	Note	%±
1900	97		—
1910	424		337.1%
1920	338		−20.3%
1930	400		18.3%
1940	456		14.0%
1950	578		26.8%
1960	570		−1.4%
1970	687		20.5%
1980	689		0.3%
1990	600		−12.9%
2000	459		−23.5%
2010	538		17.2%
2020	503		−6.5%
U.S. Decennial Census

=== 2020 census ===
Pinewood town, South Carolina – Racial and ethnic composition Note: the US Census treats Hispanic/Latino as an ethnic category. This table excludes Latinos from the racial categories and assigns them to a separate category. Hispanics/Latinos may be of any race.
Race / Ethnicity (NH = Non-Hispanic)	Pop 2000	Pop 2010	Pop 2020	% 2000	% 2010	% 2020
White alone (NH)	198	209	188	43.14%	38.85%	37.38%
Black or African American alone (NH)	258	321	275	56.21%	59.67%	54.67%
Native American or Alaska Native alone (NH)	0	1	1	0.00%	0.19%	0.20%
Asian alone (NH)	1	3	4	0.22%	0.56%	0.80%
Native Hawaiian or Pacific Islander alone (NH)	0	0	0	0.00%	0.00%	0.00%
Other race alone (NH)	0	0	0	0.00%	0.00%	0.00%
Mixed race or Multiracial (NH)	1	1	33	0.22%	0.19%	6.56%
Hispanic or Latino (any race)	1	3	2	0.22%	0.56%	0.40%
Total	459	538	503	100.00%	100.00%	100.00%

=== 2000 census ===
At the 2000 census there were 459 people, 190 households, and 130 families in the town. The population density was 429.7 inhabitants per square mile (165.9/km^{2}). There were 237 housing units at an average density of 221.9 per square mile (85.7/km^{2}). The racial makeup of the town was 43.14% White, 56.43% African American, 0.22% Asian, and 0.22% from two or more races. Hispanic or Latino of any race were 0.22%.

Of the 190 households 29.5% had children under the age of 18 living with them, 41.6% were married couples living together, 20.5% had a female householder with no husband present, and 31.1% were non-families. 30.5% of households were one person and 18.4% were one person aged 65 or older. The average household size was 2.42 and the average family size was 2.98.

The age distribution was 26.1% under the age of 18, 7.0% from 18 to 24, 24.4% from 25 to 44, 22.4% from 45 to 64, and 20.0% 65 or older. The median age was 40 years. For every 100 females, there were 80.0 males. For every 100 females age 18 and over, there were 70.4 males.

The median household income was $19,583 and the median family income was $29,688. Males had a median income of $31,750 versus $16,902 for females. The per capita income for the town was $10,853. About 15.8% of families and 19.7% of the population were below the poverty line, including 17.9% of those under age 18 and 31.1% of those age 65 or over.

== See also ==
- Millford Plantation
- Pinewood Depot
