= Gallatin River Lodge =

Hotel and restaurant in Montana, US

General information
- Location: Bozeman, Montana, U.S., 9105 Thorpe Road
- Coordinates: 45.724136°N 111.209066°W
- Opened: 1999

Other information
- Number of rooms: 12
- Facilities: Fly-fishing outfitter, Fine-dining restaurant (The Grill), Trout pond, Private river access

Website
- grlodge.com

The Gallatin River Lodge is a luxury boutique hotel, fine-dining restaurant, and fly-fishing outfitter located on the Gallatin River west of Bozeman, Montana. Opened in 1999, the lodge is situated on a 350-acre property near the confluence of the Gallatin, Madison, and Jefferson rivers, making it a prominent destination for anglers and a recognized regional dining establishment.

== History ==
That Gallatin River Lodge and its on-site restaurant, the Gallatin River Grill, were both founded and opened simultaneously in May 1999 by Steven and Christy Gamble, who had previously owned the land for many years. Steven R. Gamble, an experienced fly-fishing guide and outfitter, originally envisioned the property as a functional yet upscale base camp for fishing expeditions. The location was specifically chosen for its proximity to world-class trout fishing, including private access to the West Gallatin River.

Although the restaurant opened with the lodge, the grill's reputation as a standalone fine-dining establishment grew over time, allowing the lodge to operate year-round and serve both overnight guests as well as local diners.

Steven died in 2019 at the age of 60. His obituary noted that he spent his working life building the lodge's legacy.

== Operations and Cuisine ==
The lodge features twelve total rooms, including suites in the main building and rooms in the separate Trout Lodge. Its primary amenities are focused on lodging and guided outdoor activities, particularly year-round fly-fishing trips on the region's major rivers, including the Gallatin, Madison, and Yellowstone.

The Gallatin River Grill is known for its seasonal, farm-to-table cuisine, often highlighted in regional publications. The menu emphasizes local ingredients, incorporating produce from nearby farms and ranches. In 2018, the restaurant was noted by the Big Sky Journal for its "modern, refined technique," with sauces and stocks made from scratch under the executive chef. The Grill also maintains an extensive wine program that has received recognition.

== Recognition ==
The Gallatin River Lodge has received national and regional accolades in both the hospitality and dining industries:

- TripAdvisor Traveler's Choice Award (2017): The lodge was named one of the "Top 25 Small Hotels in the United States," an award granted to the top one percent of hotels on the platform.
- USA TODAY 10 Best Readers' Choice (2025): The lodge was selected by readers and an expert panel as one of the "10 Best Fishing Lodges in the US."
- Wine Spectator Award of Excellence: The Gallatin River Grill has been a recipient of this award for its wine list, which typically features over 120 selections.
- The lodge was an early inclusion in the Select Registry of Distinguished Inns of North America, an organization recognizing premier independent properties.
