= John Rutledge House =

Historic house in South Carolina, United States

- U.S. National Register of Historic Places
- U.S. National Historic Landmark
- U.S. National Historic Landmark District – Contributing property
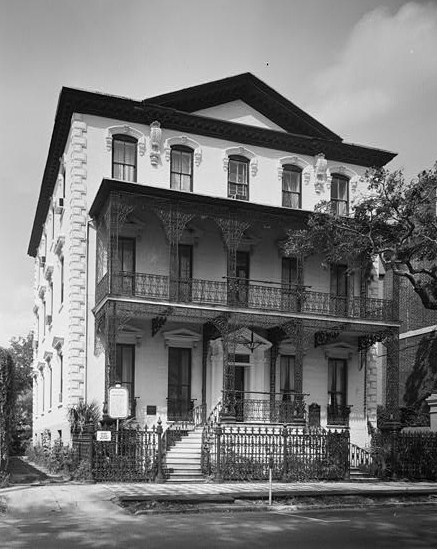
- John Rutledge House

- Location within South Carolina Location within the United States
- Location: 116 Broad St., Charleston, South Carolina
- Coordinates: 32°46′34″N 79°56′1″W
- Built: 1763
- Website: https://johnrutledgehouseinn.com
- Part of: Charleston Historic District (ID66000964)
- NRHP reference No.: 71000752

Significant dates
- Added to NRHP: November 7, 1971
- Designated NHL: November 7, 1973
- Designated NHLDCP: October 9, 1960

The Governor John Rutledge House is a historic house at 116 Broad Street in Charleston, South Carolina. Completed in 1763 by an unknown architect, it was the home of Founding Father John Rutledge, a Governor of South Carolina and a signer of the United States Constitution. It was declared a National Historic Landmark in 1973 and is a founding member of Historic Hotels of America, a program of the National Trust for Historic Preservation.

== Description and history ==
The John Rutledge House is located in historic Charleston, on the north side of Broad Street, opposite its junction with Orange Street, and the Edward Rutledge House, the home of John's brother. It is a tall three-story structure, rendered even taller by its placement on a raised basement. It has a hip roof with a front-facing gable, stuccoed walls, and corner quoining. The front facade is distinguished by an ornate two-story wrought iron balcony, which is believed to have been made by Christopher Werner.

The house was built as a two-story structure for John Rutledge in 1763, by which time he had already established a successful law practice. Rutledge played a significant role in organizing the Patriot forces of South Carolina during the American Revolutionary War, serving as the state's executive for much of the conflict. He also attended the Constitutional Convention of 1787, and is a signer of the United States Constitution. The house passed out of his family, and was enlarged by the addition of the third story in 1853 by Thomas M. Gadsden. The house served as a law office in the 20th century.

== John Rutledge House Inn ==
In 1989, the house was renovated and opened to the public as the John Rutledge House Inn.

The inn has 19 guest rooms, ranging from standard hotel rooms to large suites. 11 of these rooms are located in the main house, with the remaining 8 being in the carriage houses (located at the rear of the property). In addition to the guest rooms, the house contains a ball room (open to the public), which is used for afternoon tea as well as breakfast.

The John Rutledge House has received a 4 diamond rating from AAA, and is a member of the Select Registry.

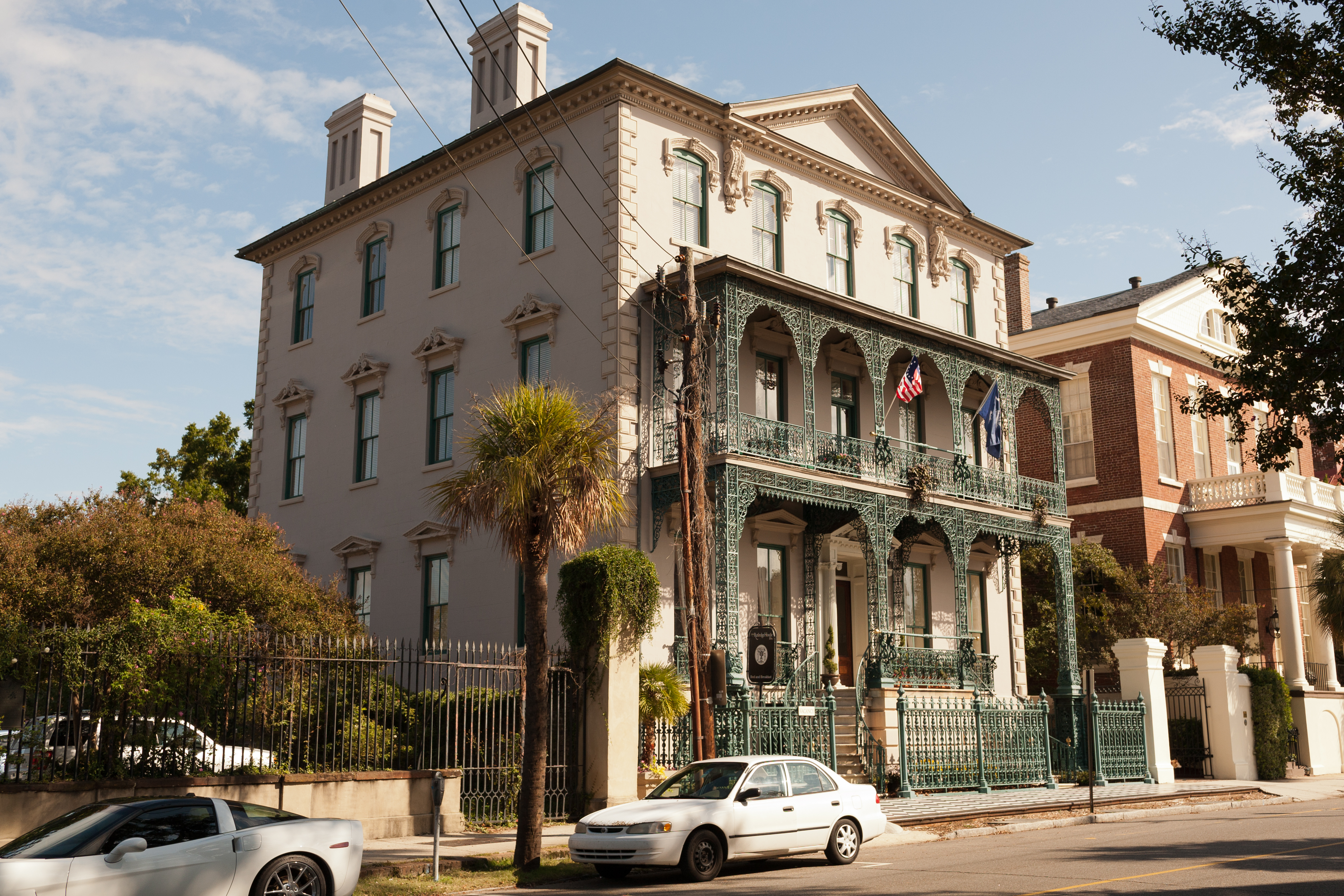
John Rutledge House, October 2011

== See also ==
- List of National Historic Landmarks in South Carolina
- National Register of Historic Places listings in Charleston, South Carolina
