= Edward Rutledge =

American Founding Father and politician (1749–1800)

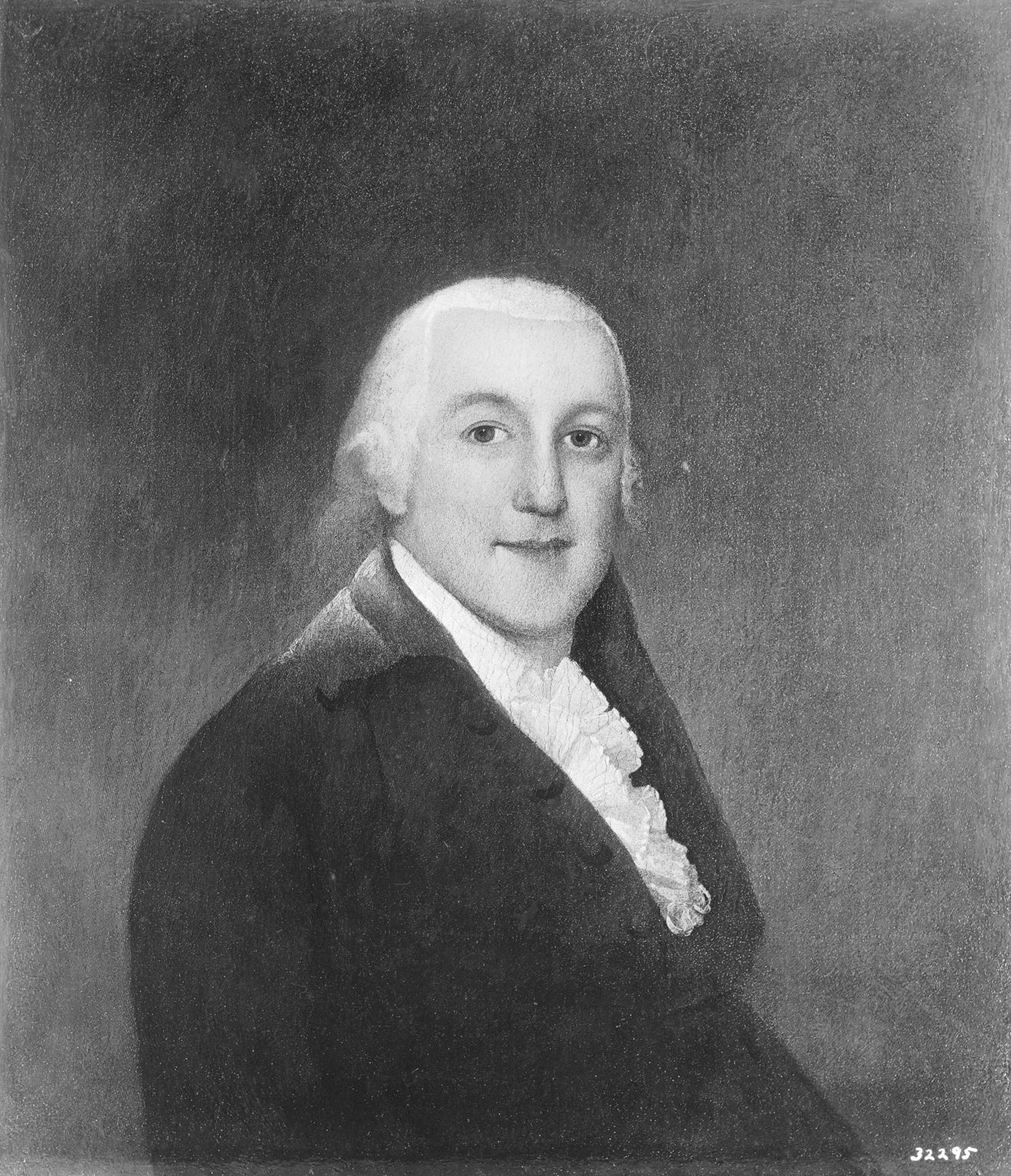
- Portrait by James Earl, c. 1791

39th Governor of South Carolina
- In office December 18, 1798 – January 23, 1800
- Lieutenant: John Drayton
- Preceded by: Charles Pinckney
- Succeeded by: John Drayton

Delegate from South Carolina to the Continental Congress
- In office 1774 – 1776

Member of the South Carolina Senate from Charleston
- In office November 28, 1796 – December 6, 1798

Member of the South Carolina House of Representatives from Charleston
- In office January 6, 1783 – November 28, 1796
- In office March 26, 1776 – October 17, 1778

Personal details
- Born: November 23, 1749 Charleston, South Carolina, British America
- Died: January 23, 1800 (aged 50) Charleston, South Carolina, U.S.
- Resting place: Saint Philip's Episcopal Church Cemetery, Charleston
- Party: Federalist
- Spouse(s): Henrietta Middleton (m. 1774; died 1792) Mary Shubrick Eveleigh
- Relatives: John Rutledge (brother)
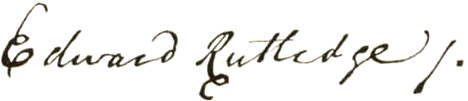
- Signature

Military service
- Allegiance: United States of America; State of South Carolina
- Branch/service: South Carolina militia
- Years of service: 1778–1781
- Rank: Captain
- Battles/wars: American Revolutionary War: Battle of Beaufort; Siege of Charleston

Edward Rutledge (November 23, 1749 – January 23, 1800) was an American Founding Father and politician who signed the Continental Association and was the youngest signatory of the Declaration of Independence. He later served as the 39th governor of South Carolina.

== Early life and education ==
Rutledge was born in Charleston, South Carolina. He was the youngest of seven children (5 sons and 2 daughters), born to Dr. John Rutledge and Sarah Hext, who was 15 when her first child (John) was born. His father was a physician and colonist of Scots-Irish descent, and his mother was born in South Carolina and was of English descent. Following his elder brothers, John and Hugh, he studied law in London at the Inns of Court. In 1772 he was admitted to the English bar (Middle Temple) and returned to Charleston to practice.

He was married on March 1, 1774, to Henrietta Middleton (17 November 1750 – 22 April 1792), daughter of Henry Middleton. The couple had three children:

- Major Henry Middleton Rutledge (5 April 1775 – 20 January 1844)
- Edward Rutledge (20 March 1778 – 1780)
- Sarah Rutledge (1782–1855)

Rutledge had a successful law practice with his partner, Charles Cotesworth Pinckney. He became a leading citizen of Charleston. He owned more than 50 enslaved people.

== Career ==
=== American Revolution ===
During the American Revolution, Rutledge served along with his brother John representing South Carolina in the Continental Congress (1774–1776). He worked to have African Americans expelled from the Continental Army. Although a firm supporter of colonial rights, he (as a delegate) was instructed initially to oppose Richard Henry Lee's Resolution of independence; South Carolina's leaders were unsure that the time was "ripe". At age 26 he was the youngest delegate to sign the Declaration of Independence.

He returned home in November 1776 to take a seat in the General Assembly. He served as a captain of artillery in the South Carolina militia, and fought at the Battle of Beaufort in 1779. In May 1780, Rutledge was captured along with his co-signers of the Declaration of Independence, Arthur Middleton and Thomas Heyward during the siege of Charleston and were taken to St. Augustine, Florida. They were released during a prisoner exchange in July 1781.

Rutledge is standing on the far right in John Trumbull's Declaration of Independence.

== Later life and death ==
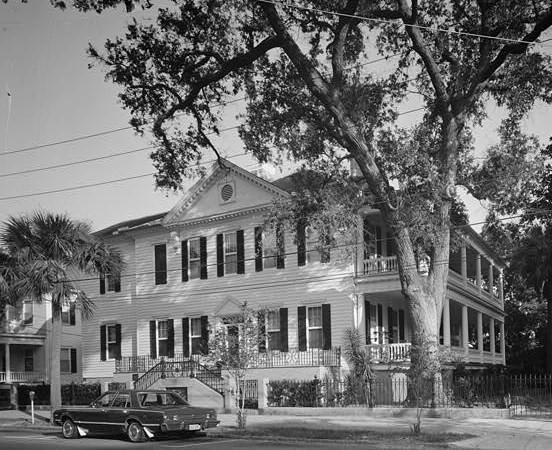
The Edward Rutledge House in Charleston

After his release he returned to the General Assembly, where he served until 1796. He was known as an active legislator and an advocate for the confiscation of Loyalist property. Like John Rutledge, Edward Rutledge opposed the Jay Treaty and the Anglophilic stance he perceived in the Federalist Party. As an elector in the 1796 presidential election, Rutledge voted for the two Southern candidates, Republican Thomas Jefferson and Federalist Thomas Pinckney.

Rutledge had not been close with the victor John Adams dating back to their days in the Continental Congress, but he approved of Adams's defense policies towards France during the Quasi-War. The opposition afforded Adams's measures by Vice President Jefferson, and the Congressional Republicans angered Rutledge because he now saw the Republicans as more partial to France than to American interests, a situation similar to the pro-British feelings he sensed in the Federalists during the Jay Treaty debates. Rutledge thereafter ceased communication with Jefferson. Rutledge served in the state senate for two years, then was elected governor in 1798.

Governor Rutledge, while attending an important meeting in Columbia, had to be sent home because of his gout. He died in Charleston before the end of his term. Some said at the time that he died from apoplexy resulting from hearing the news of George Washington's death. Since 1971, his home in Charleston is now a National Historic Landmark, and is privately owned and operated as a bed & breakfast, the Governor's House Inn.

== See also ==
- Memorial to the 56 Signers of the Declaration of Independence
- Edward Rutledge House

Political offices
Preceded by Charles Pinckney	Governor of South Carolina; 1798–1800	Succeeded by John Drayton
