= Edward Rutledge House =

Historic house in South Carolina, United States

- U.S. National Register of Historic Places
- U.S. National Historic Landmark
- U.S. National Historic Landmark District – Contributing property
- Edward Rutledge House in 2011

- Location within South Carolina Location within the United States
- Location: 117 Broad Street, Charleston, South Carolina
- Coordinates: 32°46′34″N 79°56′2″W
- Area: 1-acre (0.40 ha)
- Built: 1760
- Architect: Miller & Fullerton
- Part of: Charleston Historic District (ID66000964)
- NRHP reference No.: 71000751

Significant dates
- Added to NRHP: November 11, 1971
- Designated NHL: November 11, 1971
- Designated NHLDCP: October 9, 1960

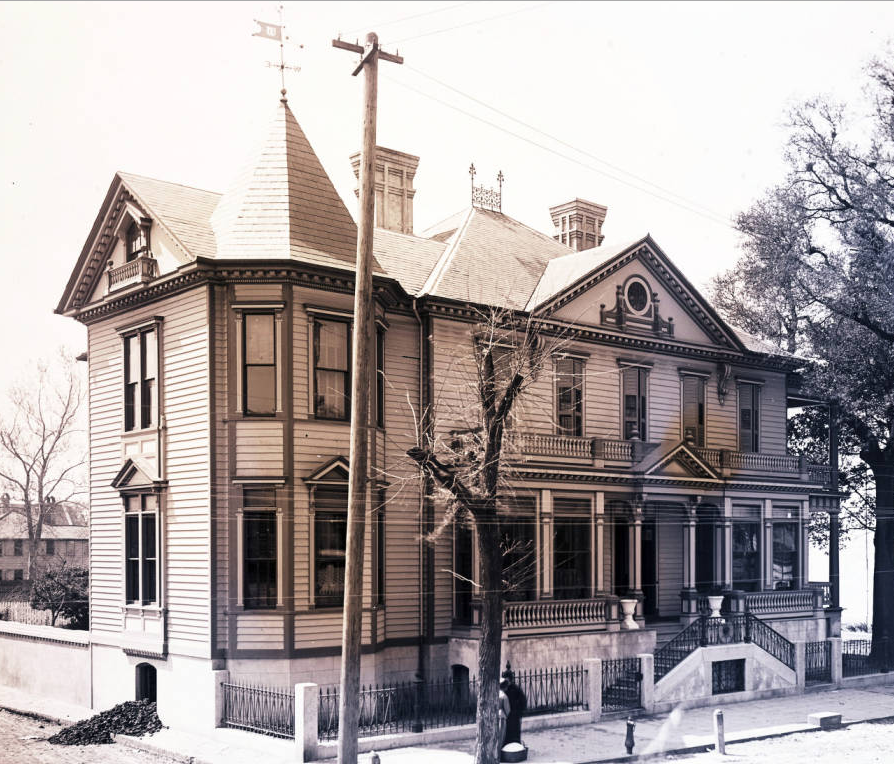
The Edward Rutledge House was heavily Victorianized during its ownership by the Wagener family as seen in this photo taken about 1890.

The Edward Rutledge House, is a historic house at 117 Broad Street in Charleston, South Carolina. This 18th-century house was built in 1760 for James Laurens, a Charleston merchant, who left in 1768 and moved to France. It was first rented to and later sold to Edward Rutledge, the home of Founding Father Edward Rutledge (1749–1800), a signer of the United States Declaration of Independence and later Governor of South Carolina. Despite many changes to the house, it retains its 18th-century core dating to about 1760, and was declared a National Historic Landmark in 1971.

== Description and history ==
The Edward Rutledge House is located in historic Charleston, at the southwest corner of Broad and Orange Streets. It is a large Charleston double house, two stories in height, with a hip roof and clapboard siding. It is oriented as many Charleston houses are, with a two-story porch facing to the right side. The facade facing Broad Street has a gable at the center of the roof, which is fully pedimented and has modillions lining its outline. An entrance is located in the center of the main five bays, topped by a transom window and gabled pediment, and flanked by sidelight windows. The interior, which has undergone much alteration due to varied uses of the house, still retains some of its original features.

The house is most notable as the home of Edward Rutledge, a signer of the United States Declaration of Independence. Rutledge, a South Carolina native, was trained in England in the law, and had by the time of the American Revolution established a law practice in Charleston. He served in the First and Second Continental Congresses, and spent time during the American Revolutionary War as a prisoner of war, having been captured in the 1780 Siege of Charleston. He served as Governor of South Carolina from 1798 to his death in 1800.

The home was used for many years as a bed & breakfast, but has been returned to a private residence after extensive renovations. Where possible the Georgian exterior was restored, the windows once again being 9 x 9 and triple hung windows restored where they were removed. The front steps have regained their original shape, whereby old original windows were discovered. The extensive parking lot has been returned to an attractive garden while the kitchen house is showing its original attractive brick once again. The interior of the main house shows again a center hall and the library has returned, with Georgian style trim. In the back of the property a carriage house of old bricks and a conservancy jhave been added.

== See also ==
- John Rutledge House, across the street
- List of National Historic Landmarks in South Carolina
- National Register of Historic Places listings in Charleston, South Carolina
