= Christopher Werner =

American architect

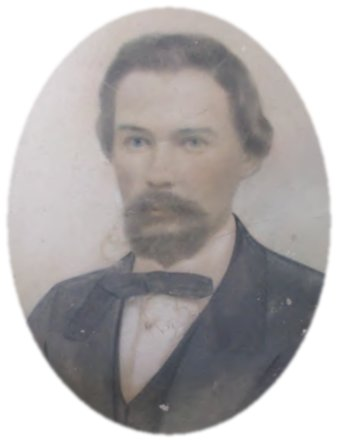
- ca 1850
- Born: April 13, 1805; Münster, Westphalia, Prussia
- Died: June 10, 1875 (aged 70)
- Resting place: St. Laurence cemetery (Roman Catholic); Charleston, South Carolina
- Known for: wrought iron designs
- Spouse: Isabella Hanna
- Children: 6

Christopher W. Werner (1805–1875) was a nineteenth-century wrought iron manufacturer, artisan, and entrepreneur based in Charleston, South Carolina, US. He was one of three noted German-American ironworkers in Charleston, who created most of its high-quality wrought iron. He had immigrated from Prussia in his late 20s, already an accomplished businessman. In Charleston he married a young woman from England, another immigrant, and they had a family.

Werner is known for crafting the "Iron Palmetto", dedicated to South Carolina's Palmetto Regiment that fought in the Mexican–American War. Erected in 1853, it is the oldest monument on the grounds of the state Capitol. He was highly influential, completing high-quality iron design and manufacture in Charleston and throughout the state, including gates, architectural ornamentation, and balconies.

== Biography ==
Werner was born in 1805 in Münster, in the Prussian Westphalia (now the North Rhine-Westphalia region of Germany). His father, Burnhard, was a wealthy carriage builder. The young Werner learned his initial blacksmithing skills of iron working in his father's blacksmith shop. Werner became known while still a young man as a carriage maker, blacksmith, wrought iron worker, and a businessman.

In Prussia, Werner would have to serve compulsory years in the authoritarian Prussian Army. He decided to emigrate to the United States, which he did in the early 1830s.

He took up residence in Charleston, South Carolina, where he obtained American citizenship by naturalization in 1839. He almost certainly arrived in America more than five years before that, as the naturalization process at that time took at least five years to complete. In 1841 Werner married Isabella Hanna, an immigrant from Liverpool, England. They had six children, five of whom lived to adulthood, with a son named Bernard dying at the age of six. Their children were literate and some received formal schooling. John Hanna Werner, the youngest son, was sent to Germany for part of his schooling. The children were raised in the Lutheran church.

According to the 1850 U.S. census, in 1850 Werner was 45 years old and his wife about 13 years his junior, with an age of 32. The other family members were Robert H. Werner (9), Mary Werner (8), Bernard Werner (1), and Hannah Werner (65). According to the next census, in 1860 Werner was 55 years old and his wife 14 years his junior, 41 years old, the other family members being Robert Werner (18), Mary Werner (15), Jno. H Werner (4), Grace Werner (1), and Ann Lee (70). They lived in Charleston Ward 4, Charleston, South Carolina. Werner and his wife reared their children in his Lutheran faith.

== American career ==
Werner had followed in his father's footsteps and first became a maker of carriages. He later added a blacksmith shop, a wheelwright shop, and a moulding shop to his business as a carriage maker. His foundry was located in Charleston on the street corner of Cumberland and State. His business soon expanded into a large enterprise throughout the state of South Carolina. Werner had an excellent reputation for quality work. It has been said that his work did not need the modest stamp "Werner, fecit" (Werner made it) as the grace and beauty of his work spoke for itself. (Note: Werner's obituary exclaimed, "Immediately the effect of his genius was felt, and ever since then it has not needed the modest stamp "Werner, fecit" to tell by whose masterly direction beauty and grace of proportion and very life took possession of the dead metal." "Christopher Werner Obituary". News & Courier. June 14, 1875. p. 6.)

During the nineteenth-century there was a type of guild of the "mechanic class" in Charleston, which was a group of men with special skills related to the mechanics of blacksmithing. They constituted a more or less secret society, keeping this "mechanic class" technology information to themselves. It was not shared publicly.

Werner liked to construct new buildings and remodel older existing buildings. Because of this, he was temporarily located at his project while working on the "old house" and the "new house", and had his address there. He moved within different Charleston addresses, but always kept his foundry business address, near State and Cumberland Streets, as a permanent one. In 1859 he advertised in one of the Charleston directories, "C. Werner manufacturer of Railings, Verandahs, and Fancy Iron Works generally, together with repairing & smithery in all branches ... No.17 State, near corner of Cumberland St." Most of his temporary addresses were in the vicinity of his foundry business and located generally on State Street, Cumberland Street, and Meeting Street.

Werner strove "to show what could be accomplished in Charleston in the adornment of edifices, to make it worthy of the name of 'Queen City of the South.'" He was one of three German immigrants in Charleston who "created an abundance of the mid-nineteenth century ironwork." The other two were J. A. W. Iusti and Frederick Julius Ortmann.

== Works ==
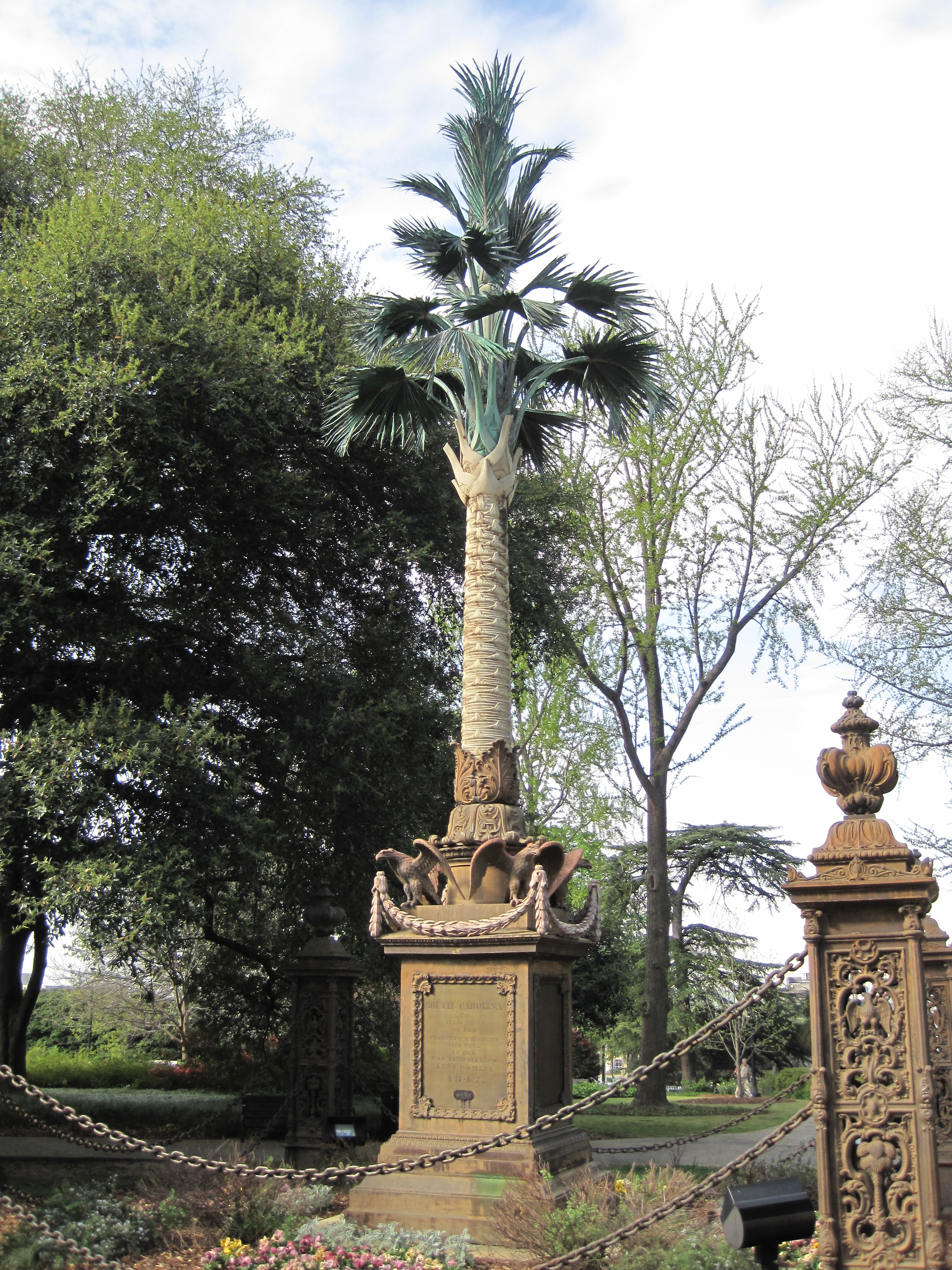
Palmetto Regiment Monument, state capitol grounds

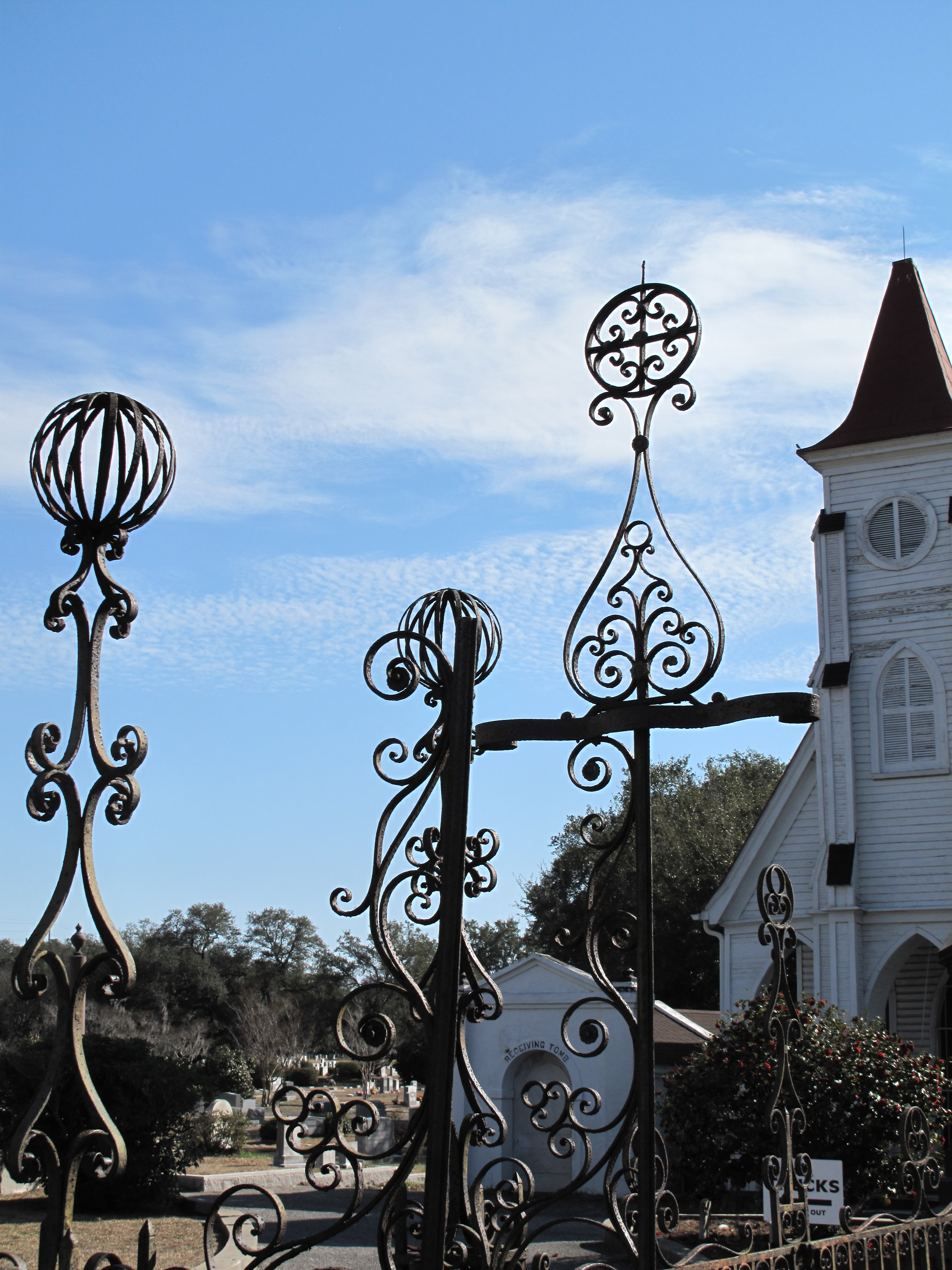
Typical Werner gates

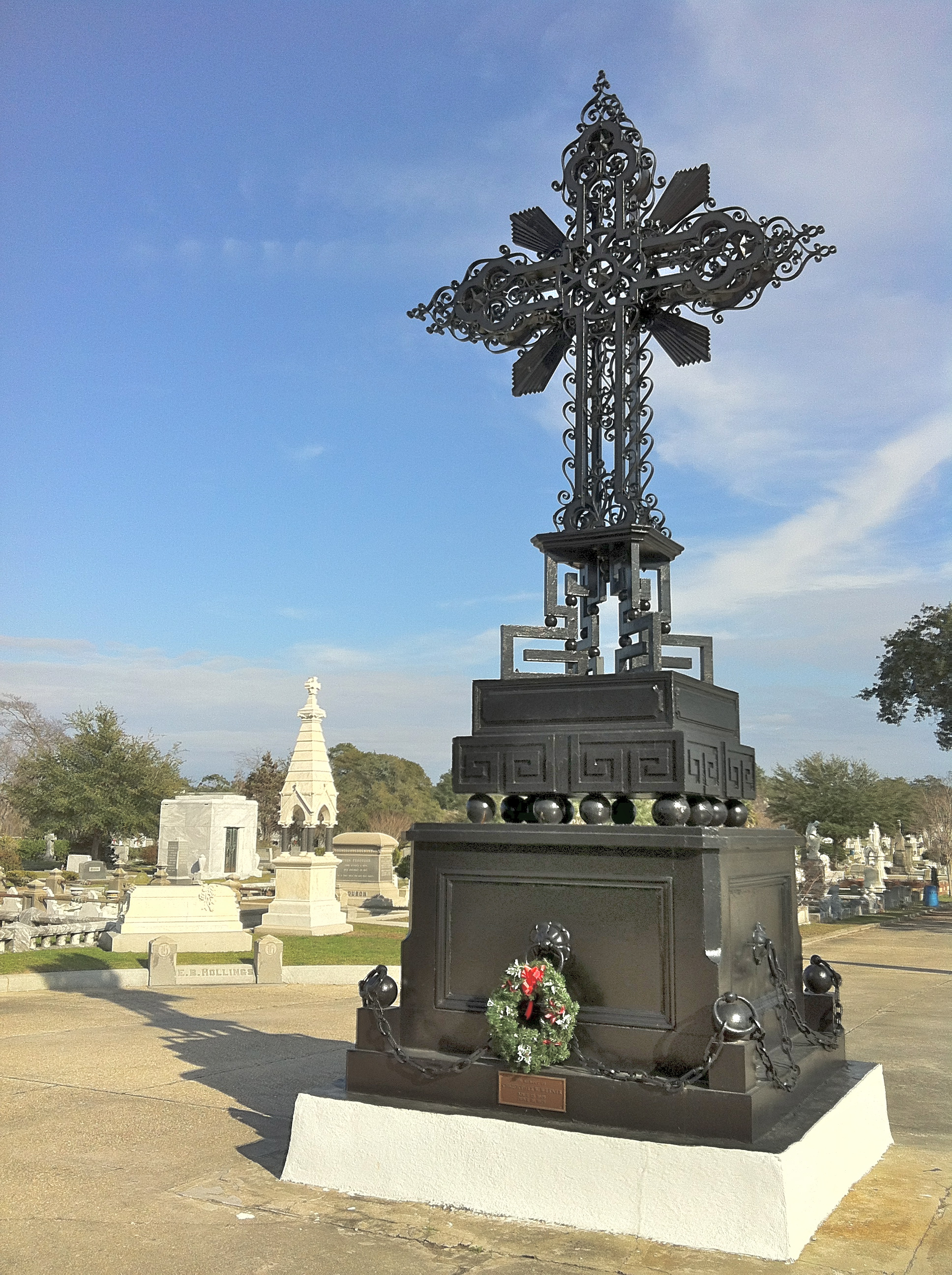
The cross Werner made, which was erected at his burial site

He constructed iron fences and other wrought iron projects all over South Carolina. He was known for his design of business signs, using a wrought iron snake as the figure to hold the sign. The snake extended in circles from the wall, where it hung by its tail. In the snake's jaws was a sign of the merchant's business. A well-known work of Werner's was the spiral and finial of St. Matthew's Lutheran church on King Street. He also made all the wrought ironwork for the Abbeville, South Carolina, county courthouse.

Werner was hired to create the decorative ironwork at Charleston's new Guard House (i.e., police station) at Meeting and Broad St. in 1838.

He was known for his manufacture in 1853 of the wrought iron Palmetto Monument, located on the Capitol grounds in Columbia. Made of iron, brass and copper, it represented the palmetto tree and commemorated the Palmetto Regiment that had fought in the Mexican–American War. (Note: "The State"; December 22, 1907; Issue: 6134; Page: 17 (column 3) "But the crowning achievement of Werner's artistic life was the making of what is at the same time his loveliest and most famous piece of work – namely, his wonderfully beautiful palmetto tree, which was bought by the State of South Carolina to serve as a noble monument to the memory of the splendid Palmetto regiment, whose achievements are among the finest in the whole long list of gallant feats in the history of American arms. This tree is made of iron, copper and brass and was built in 1853...") (Note: Werner's obituary described it as, "Inimitable in execution and almost excelling nature..." "Christopher Werner Obituary". News & Courier. June 14, 1875. p. 6.) The lifelike tri-colored metal sculpture—"scarcely distinguishable from a real tree"—was designed by Henry Steenken, who worked in Werner's shop. After it was toppled and shattered by a "freak" February 3, 1939, tornado, the monument and the plates with the names of the war dead were restored.

Werner had made the monument without a commission, and as "a speculation." He was relying upon his execution of the sculpture, and the tree's importance as a secular and cultural icon, to enable him to be paid for it. He knew that the state had suffered a loss of many men. Like "a fisherman, casting and letting the bait settle," he installed the monument in front of the old statehouse. He had done it is an homage, embodying the State Seal's palmetto tree and recognizing the sacrifices of men from the state in the Mexican War (1846–1848). (Note: The South had sent 43,232 troops, compared to 22,136 from the more populated North. The "Palmetto Regiment suffered greater losses than any other American unit." Of 974 volunteers, 501 succumbed to wounds and disease. Among them was former governor Pierce M. Butler, who died in the fight. Bryan, John Morrill (1999). Creating the South Carolina State House. Columbia, South Carolina: University of South Carolina. pp. 39–42. ISBN 1-57003-291-2.) The question of payment for the monument and for the associated plaques became embroiled in politics, leaving Werner unhappy and dissatisfied.

Called by some the "Iron Palmetto," it is the oldest monument at the Capitol. Werner was initially paid $5,000 for the sculpture; but he said he had put more than $11,000 into the project.

He manufactured the "Sword Gate", likely designed by well-regarded Charleston architect Charles F. Reichert. It is one of the two most notable iron gates in Charleston, the other being the St. Michael's Cemetery Gate by Iusti. Like many of Werner's other works, it was probably ordered by one patron and installed for another, because the work exceeded the initial contractual cost.

Werner also created the iron gate located at 34 Broad St., Charleston, South Carolina.

According to a 1907 newspaper report, Werner's wrought ironwork could be seen at Mayor Rhett's "handsome old house" on Broad Street in Charleston, previously (and later) known as the John Rutledge House. Werner had made the wrought iron work for the original owner, Thomas N. Gadsden. The Rutledge house incorporates two of Werner's favored design elements: palmettos and eagles. Werner also made the entrance gate to Judge Simonton's house at Tradd and Legare streets.

Werner crafted the iron gates for the Hibernian Hall, built in 1840 as a meeting place for the Hibernian Society, an Irish benevolent organization founded by immigrants in 1801. The Hall was later associated with the National Democratic Convention of 1860, a critical political assembly in United States history. Democratic divisiveness is believed to have contributed to Republican Abraham Lincoln winning the presidency that year. The design includes Irish harps. This building has been designated as a National Historic Landmark.

Werner continued to work until 1870, making a career in Charleston alone of more than 35 years. He is considered a successor of other master craftsmen in Charleston, and he was one of a triumvirate of 19th-century German masters of fashioning iron into artful gates. According to traditional folklore, some of Charleston’s "finest" cast iron gates were cut down during the American Civil War and reworked as horseshoes. Others were said to be melted down to create the sides of the ironclad CSS Virginia, formerly the USS Merrimack.

The United States Patent Office shows that Werner has patent No.109,694, issued November 29, 1870, for an improvement in awning-frames. Another Werner patent was filed posthumously in 1877 by his widow Isabella as No.194,278, on improvements of Werner's previous patent.

== Death and burial ==
Werner died on June 11, 1875. A large wrought-iron cross was erected at his grave, near the entrance to the St. Lawrence Roman Catholic cemetery, Charleston. Having grown up in the Roman Catholic faith, Werner wanted to be buried in the new Catholic cemetery south of Magnolia. (Note: D. Huger Bacot Jr.; "Christopher Werner: Great Iron-Worker, Creator of Famous Palmetto on State-House Grounds and of the Beautiful Designs Here and in Charleston", The State, 22 December 1907; Issue: 6134; Page: 17; Location: Columbia, South Carolina. The last paragraph of this source says: "At his death Werner remembered the religion that he had been brought up in and expressed a wish that he should be buried in the Roman Catholic cemetery at Magnolia. As has already been said, he willed the splendid iron cross spoken of should be placed over his grave. This all came as a surprise to his family, which had grown up Lutheran. But his wish was respected, and he was buried in St. Laurence cemetery, with his handsome iron cross above him just as he desired. And thus passed away the profound master of wrought iron work, whose life and splendid accomplishments are striking illustrations of that noble lien -'A thing of beauty is a joy forever.'") His family was surprised by this request because they were reared as Lutheran, but his wishes were honored. Father Daniel J. Quigley, a priest from Charleston's Roman Catholic Cathedral, officiated at the funeral.

Werner's grave is numbered Range Center Plat 1, Lot 1, Grave 1. His age at death was given as seventy years and four months, and the cause of death as chronic hepatitis. After his widow died on June 29, 1894, she was buried alongside him. When the monumental cross was dismantled to be restored, the remains of both were found beneath it.

== Gallery ==
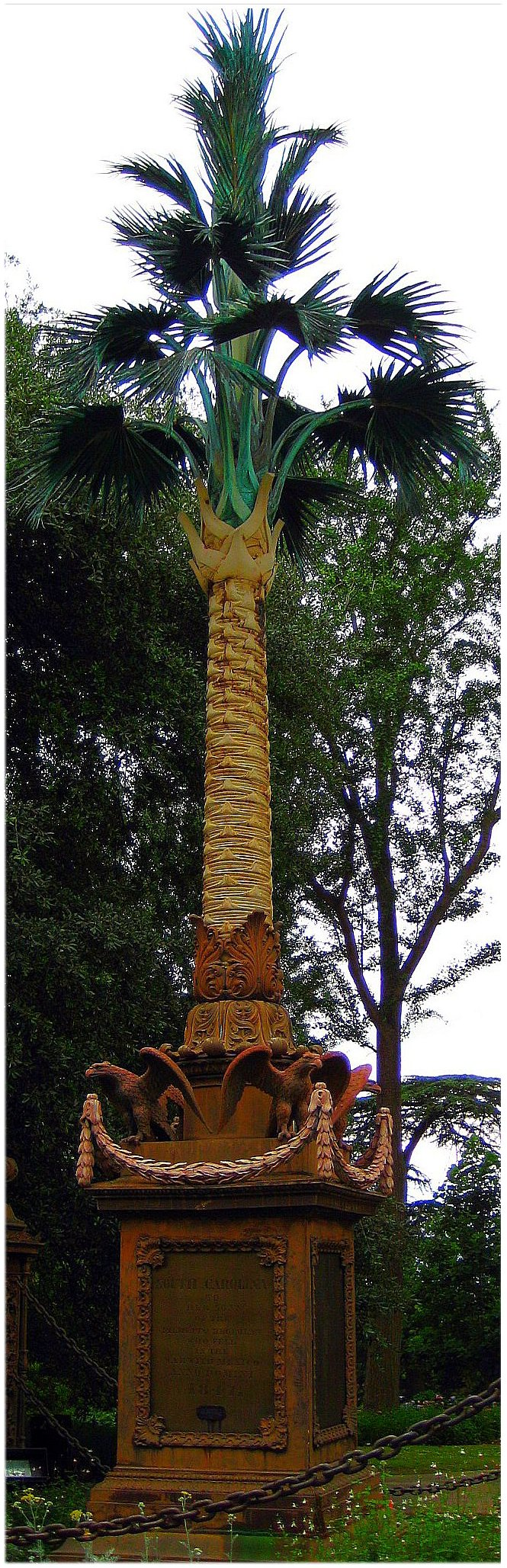
Werner Palmetto Regiment Monument

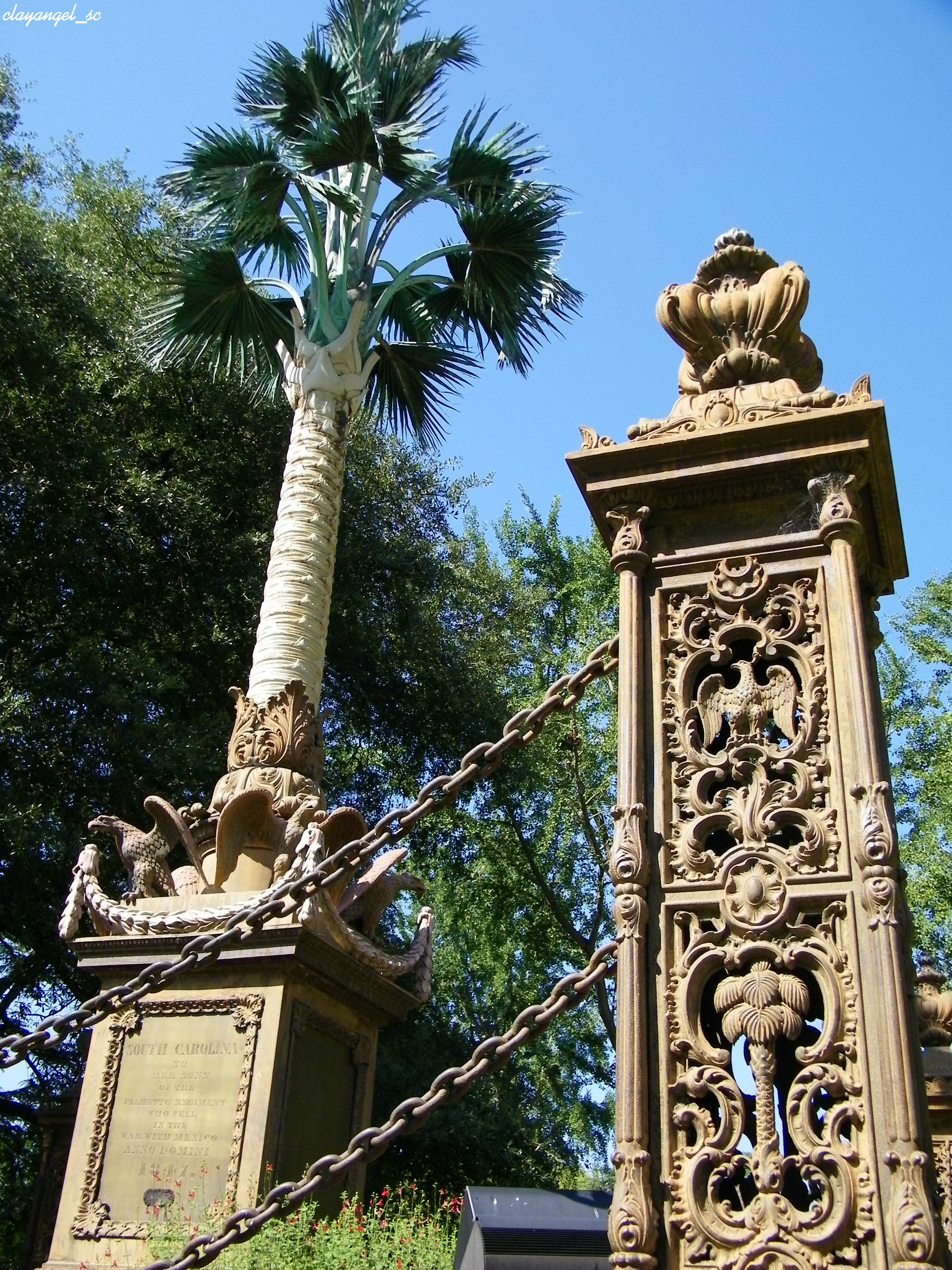
Palmetto Regiment Monument

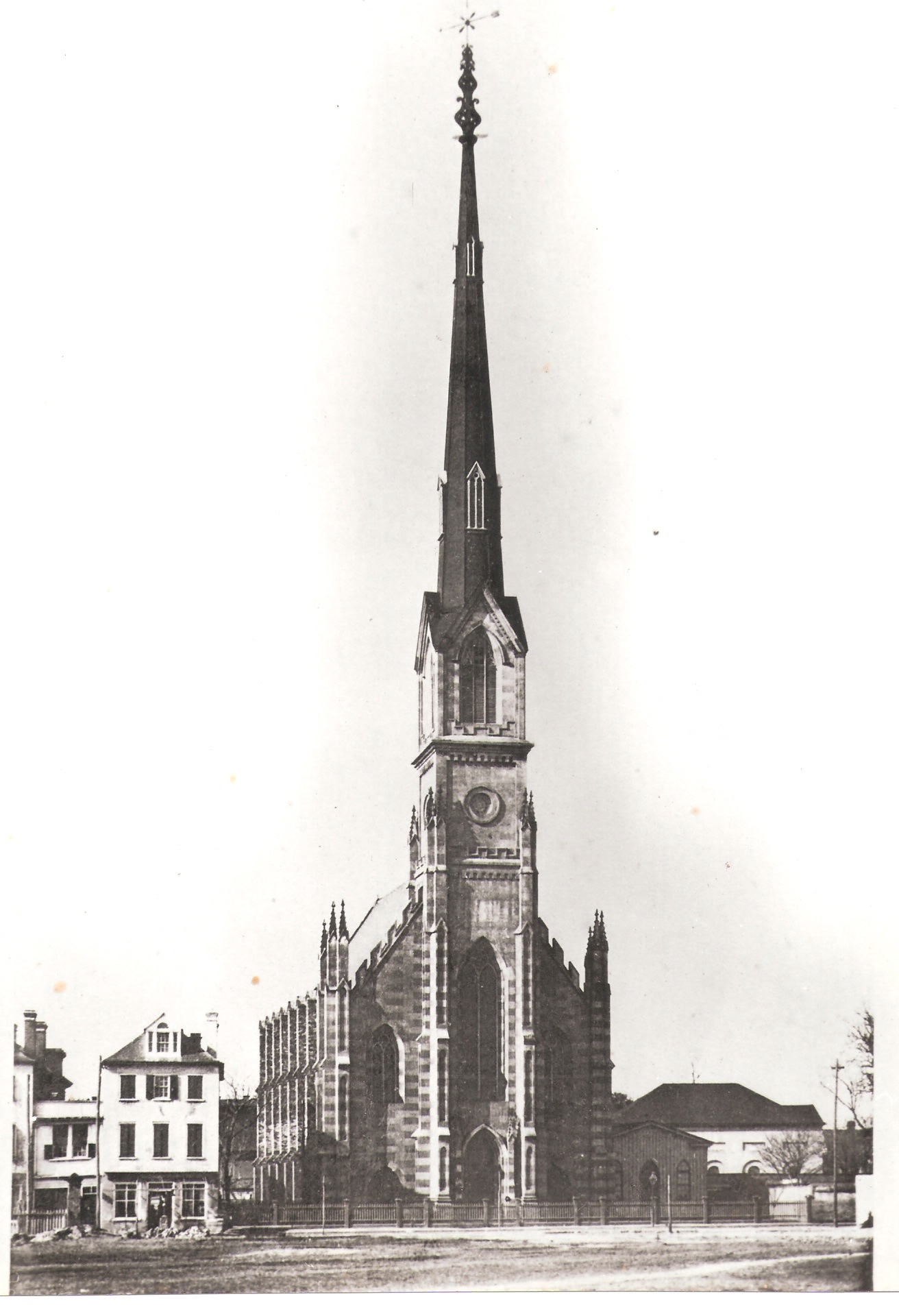
St. Matthew's church showing Warner's spiral with finial
(a rare picture from 1883)

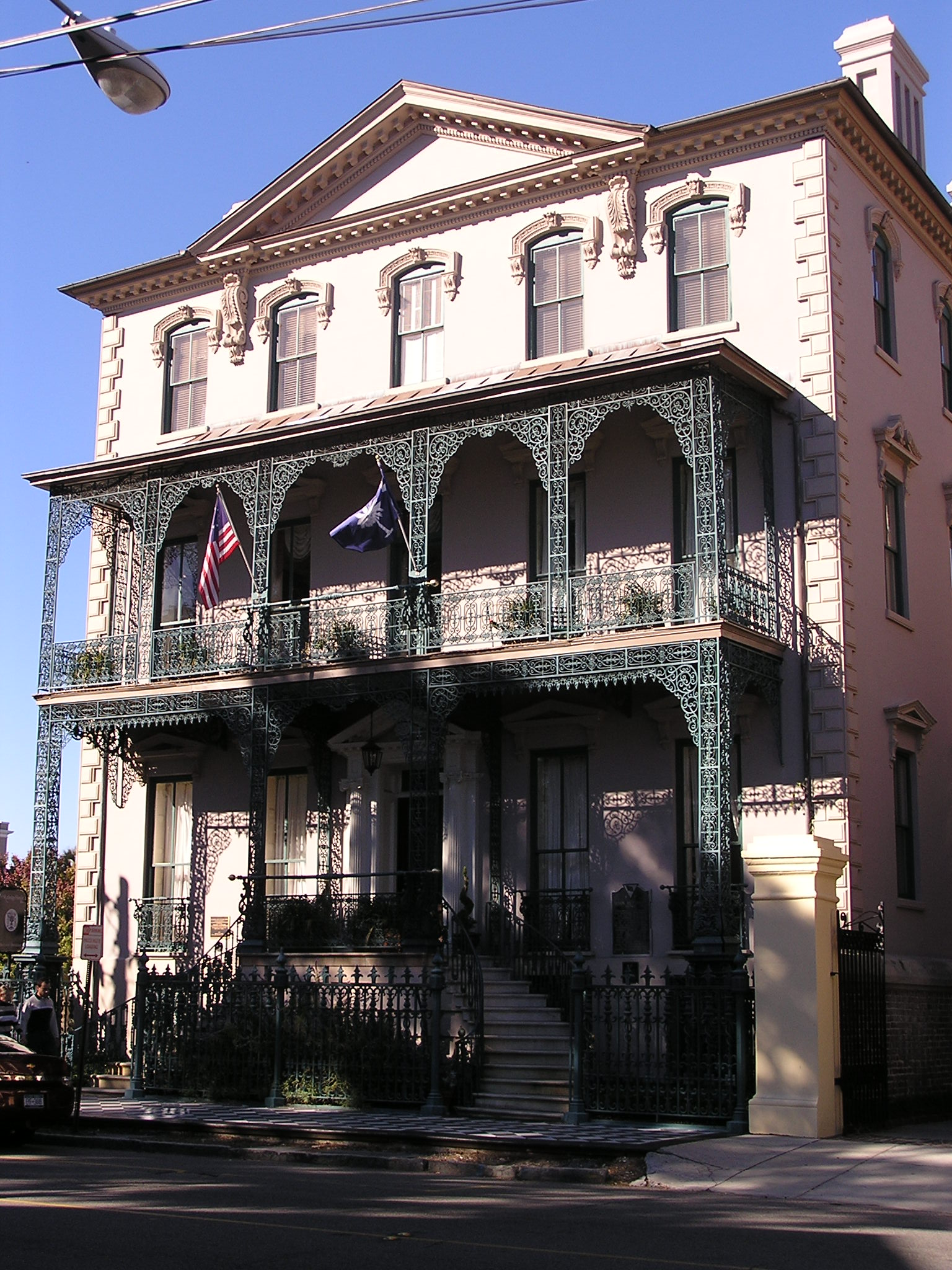
John Rutledge House
front wrought iron work

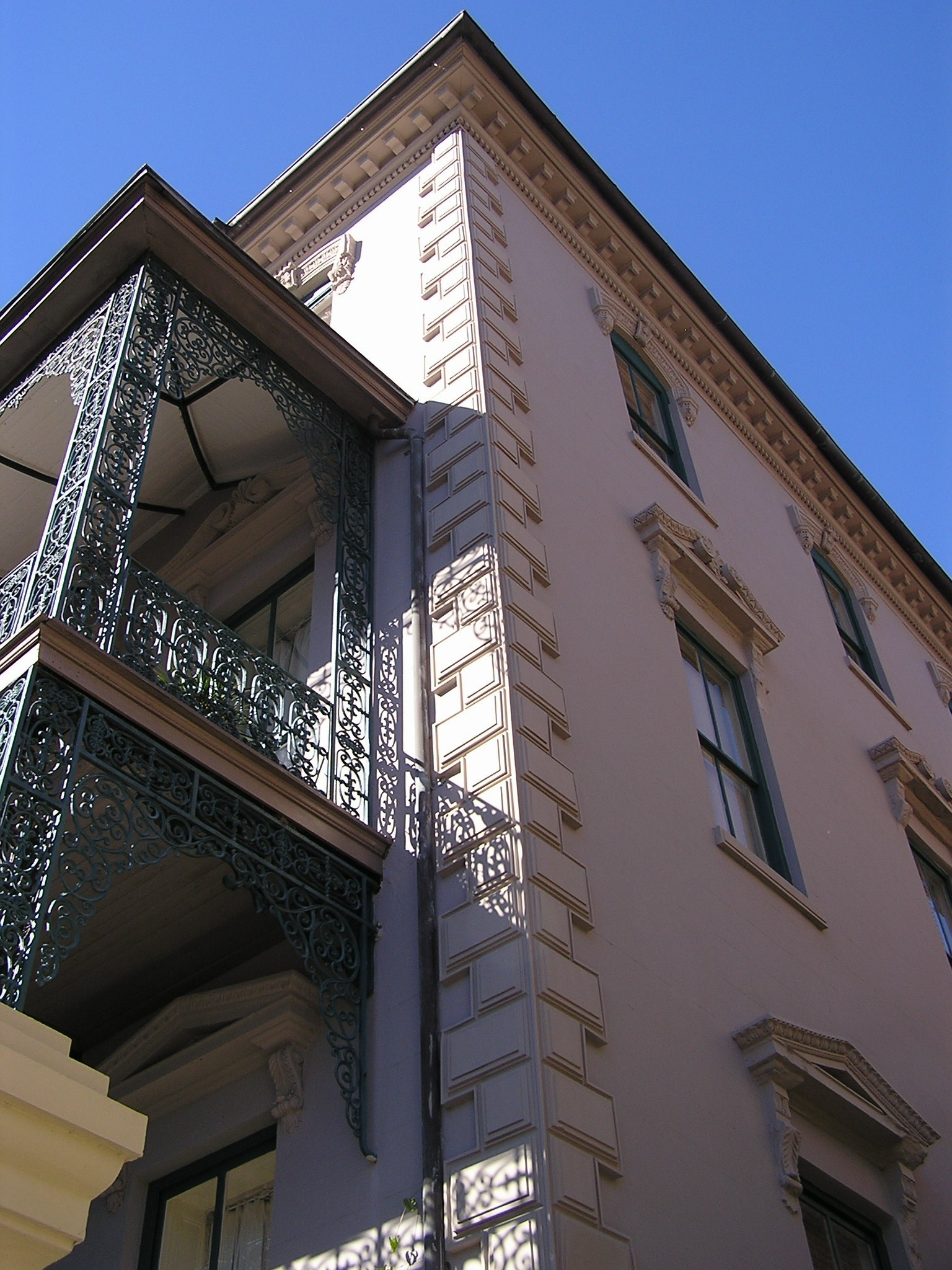
Christopher Werner
Rutledge House designs

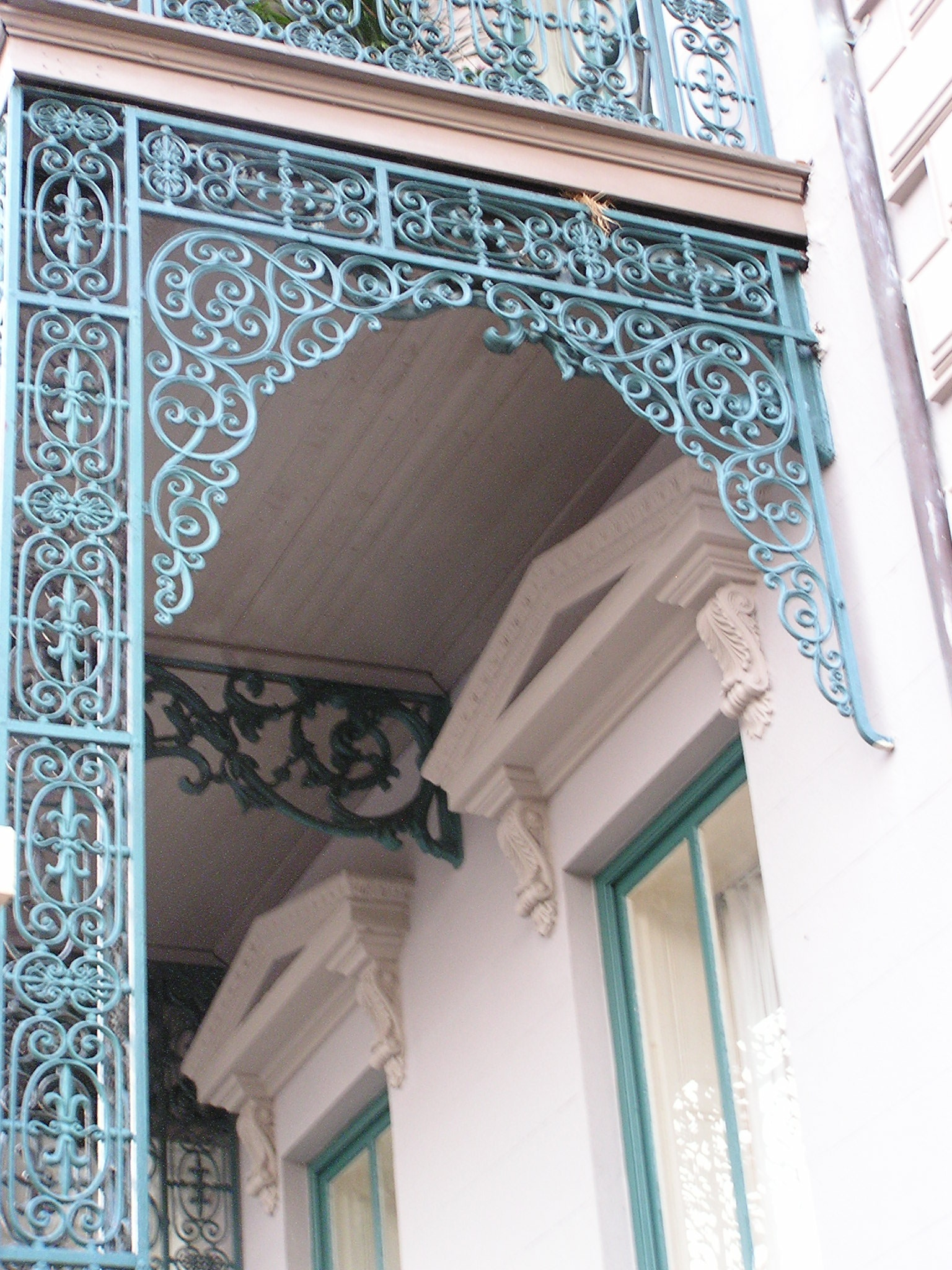
Ruthledge House
porch design

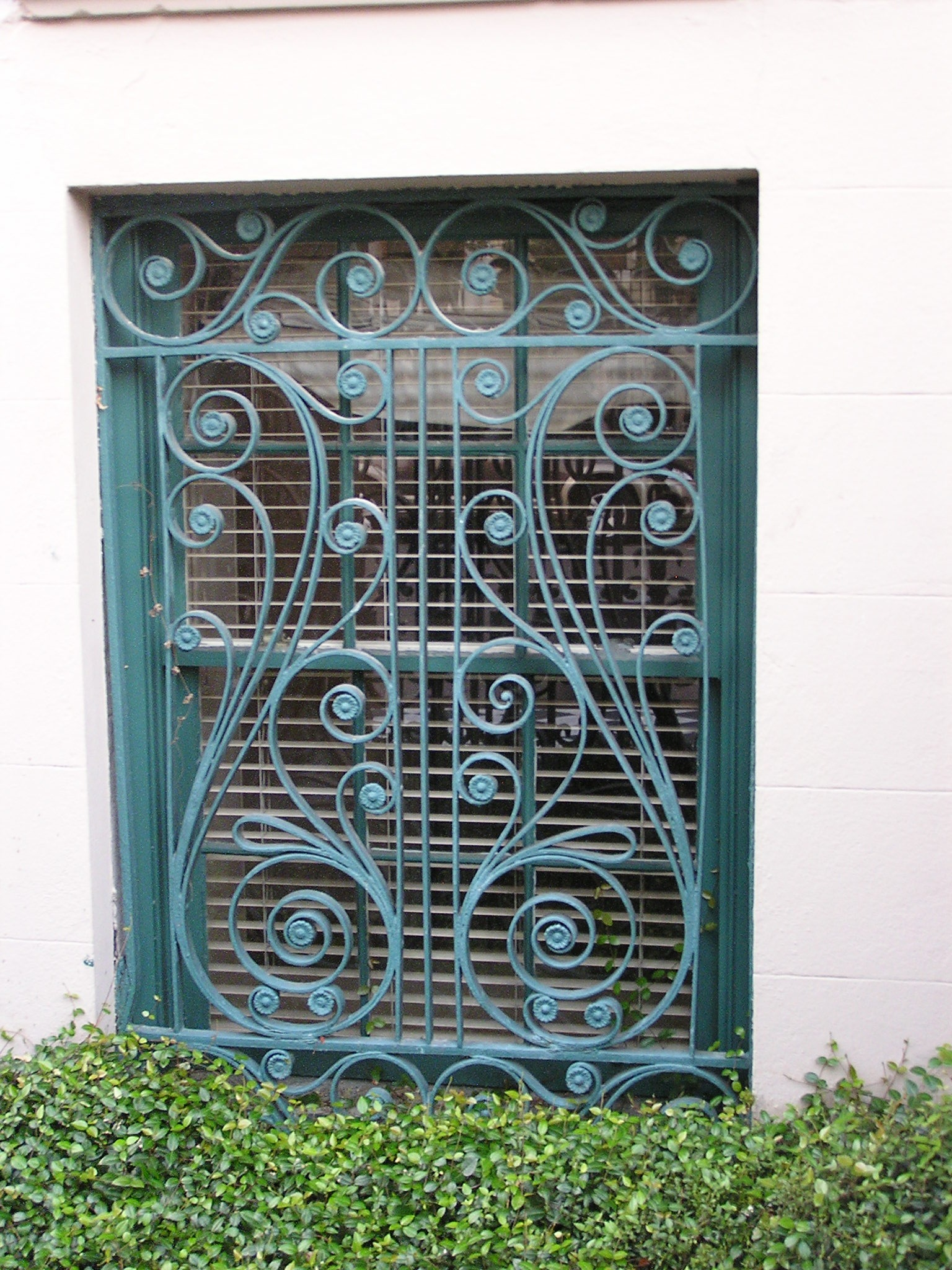
Rutledge house
window design

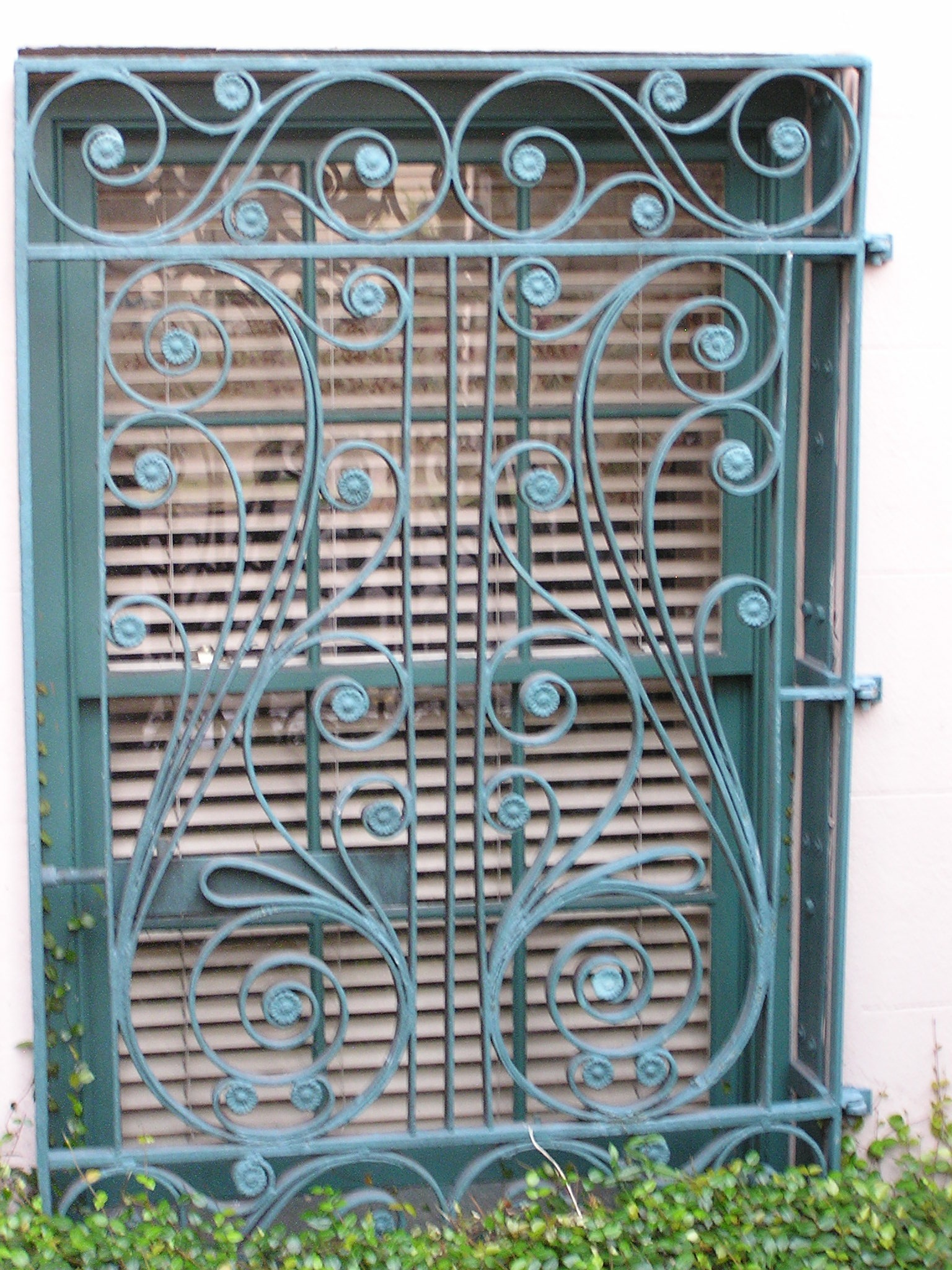
Rutledge house
window cover

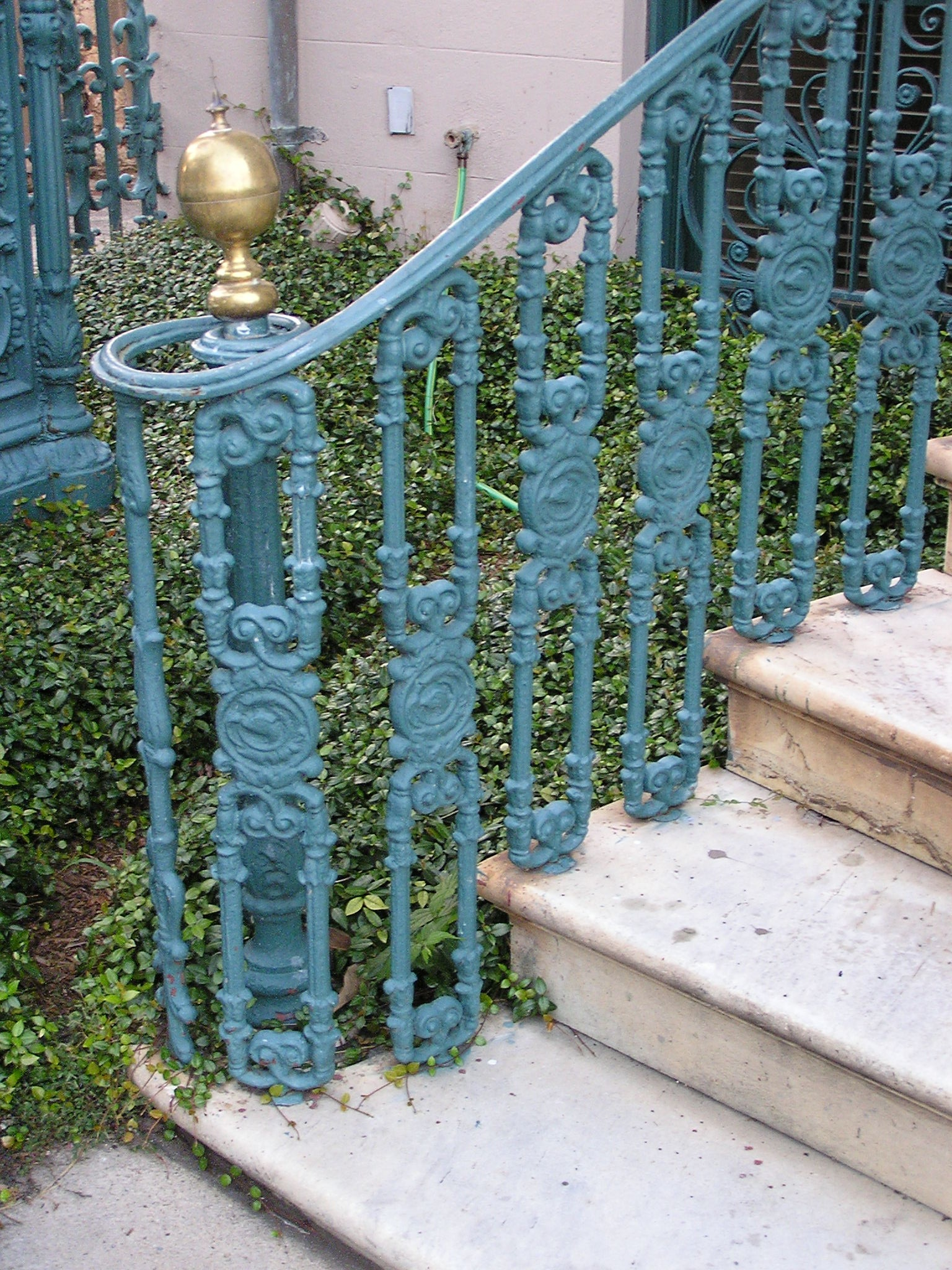
Rutledge house
stair design

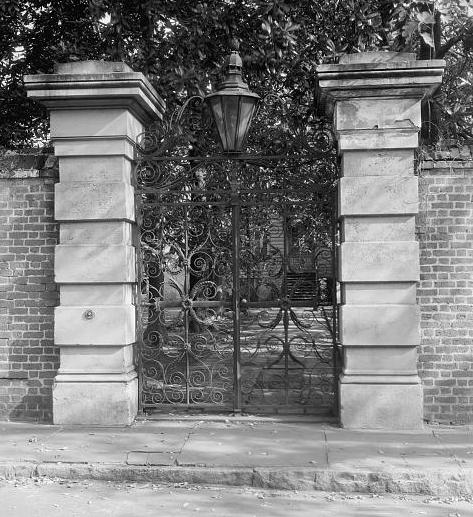
Swords Gate House
32 La Gare St
Charleston, SC

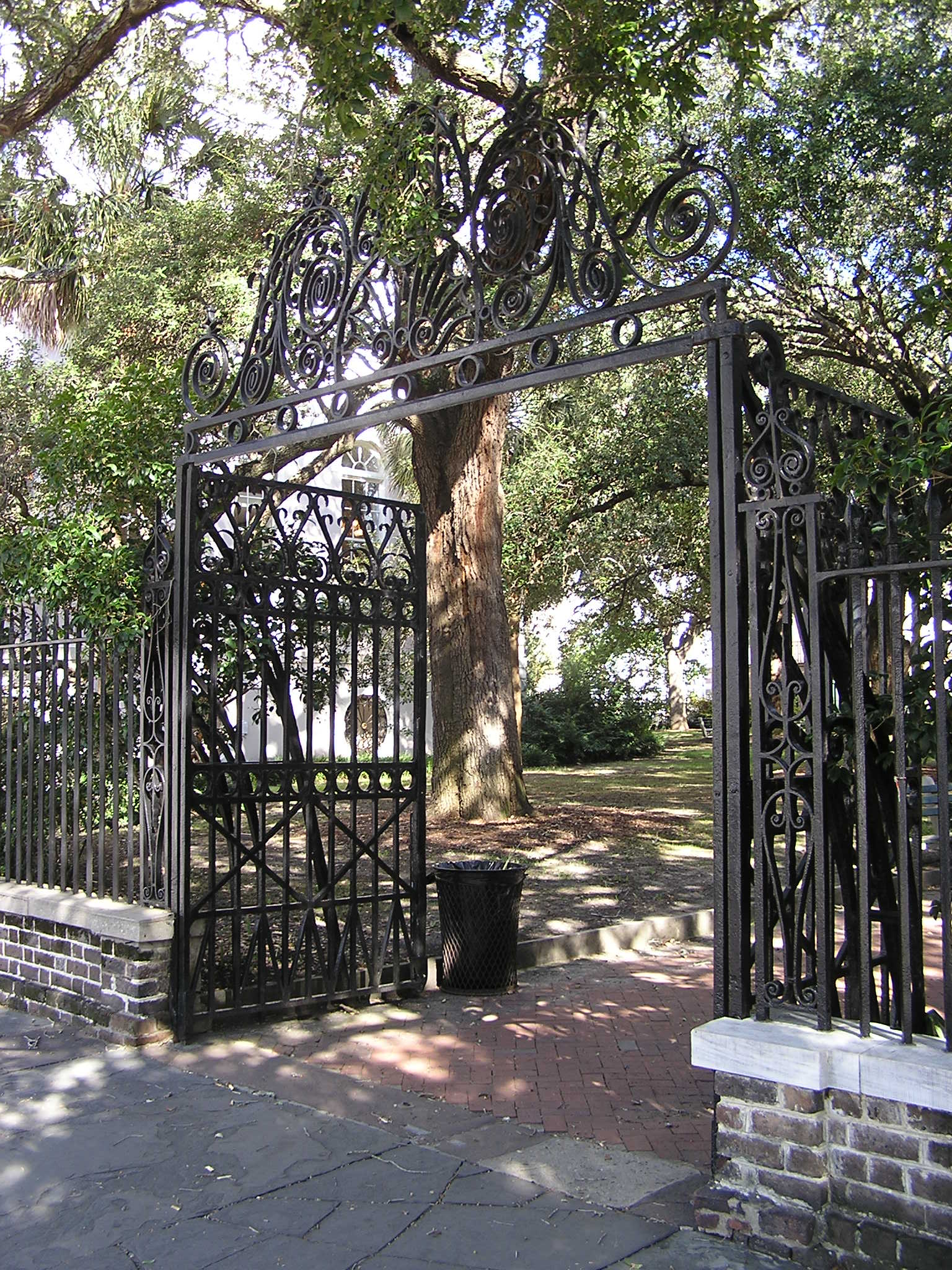
Gate work by Werner

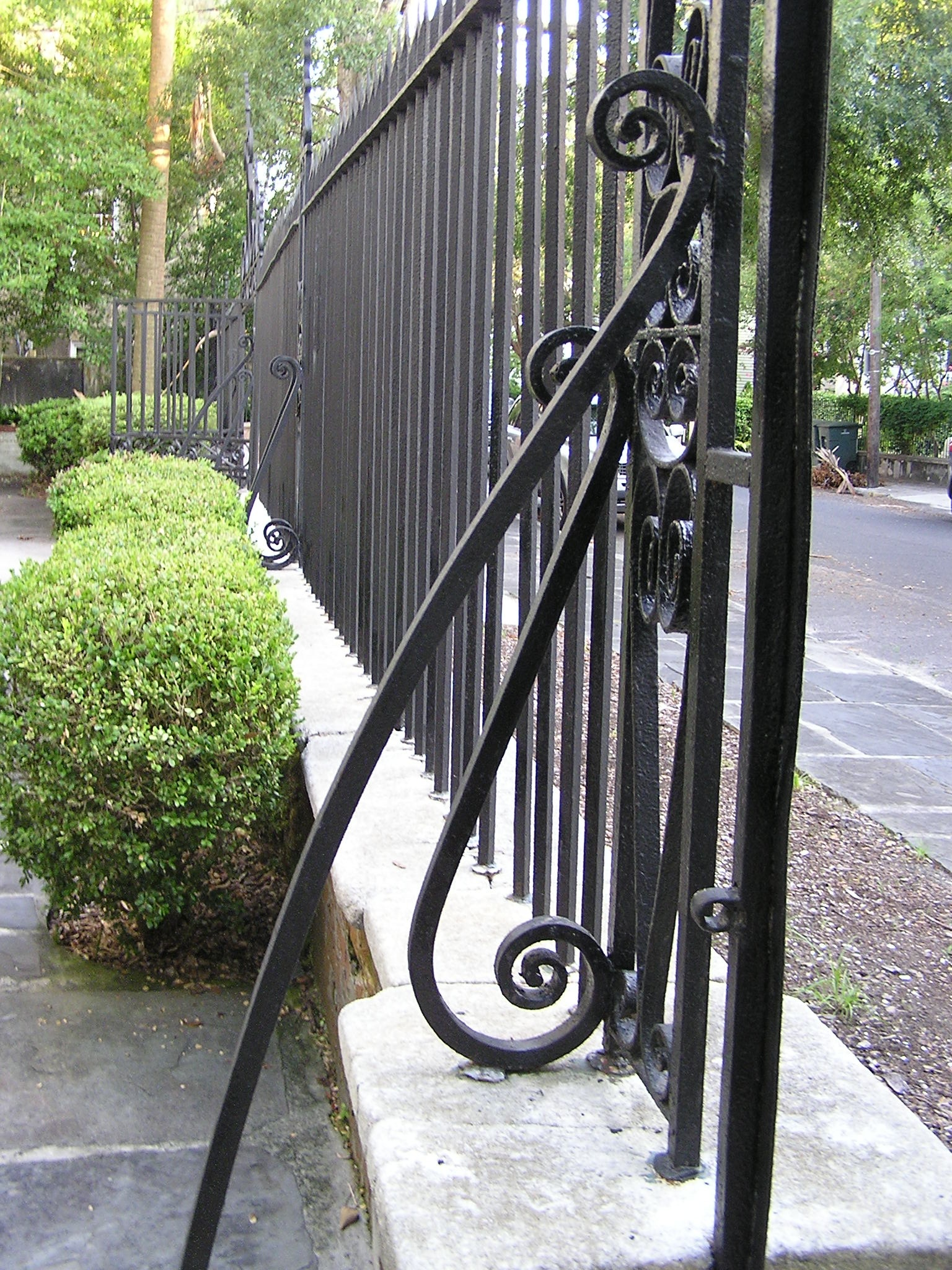
St. Peter's Churchyard fence design by Werner

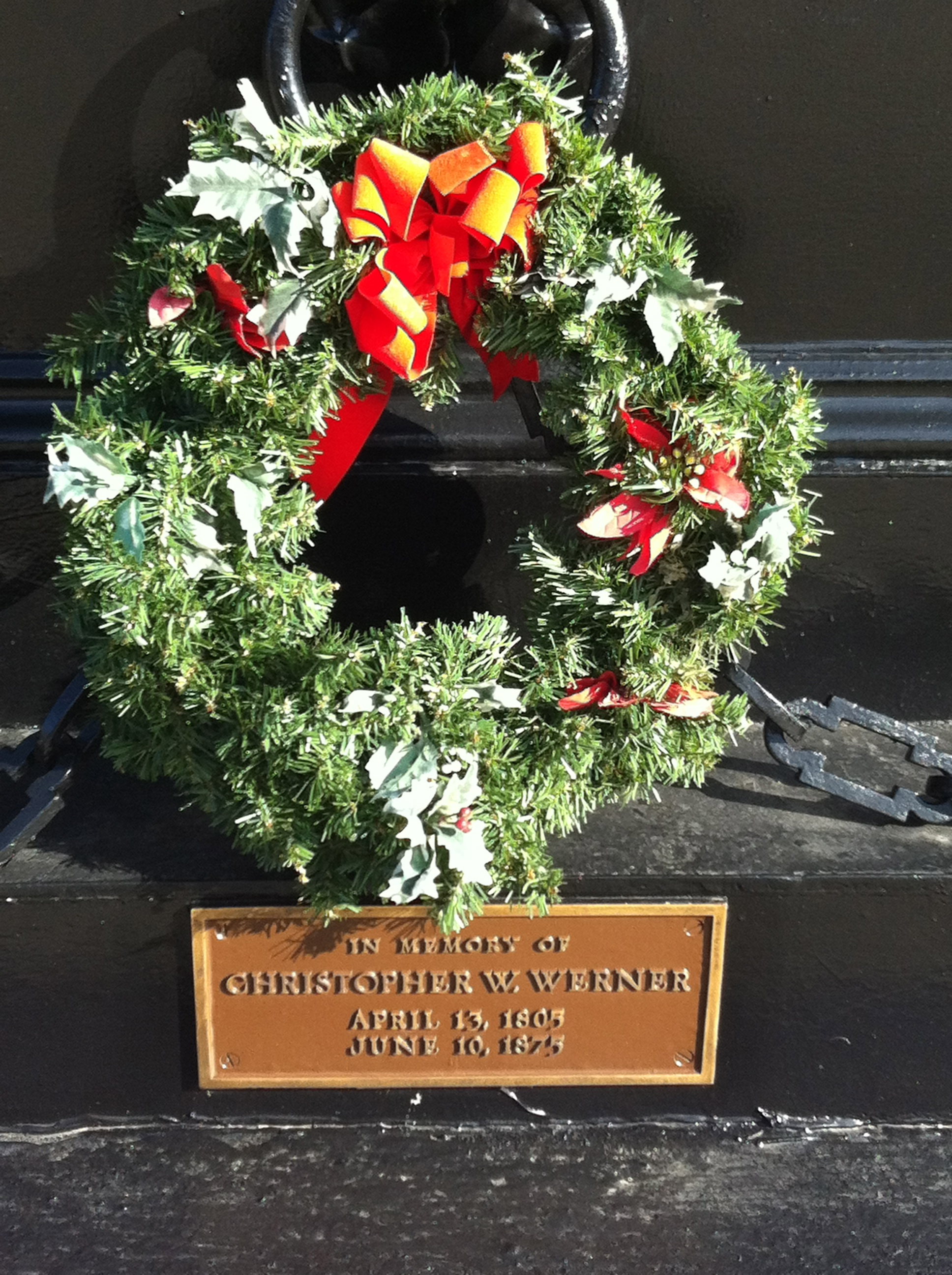
Close up of the burial marker on the base of Werner Cross,
Charleston, SC

== See also ==
- Charleston, South Carolina – art, architecture, literature, science
- John Henry Devereux
