= South Carolina State House =

State capitol building of the U.S. state of South Carolina

- U.S. National Register of Historic Places
- U.S. National Historic Landmark
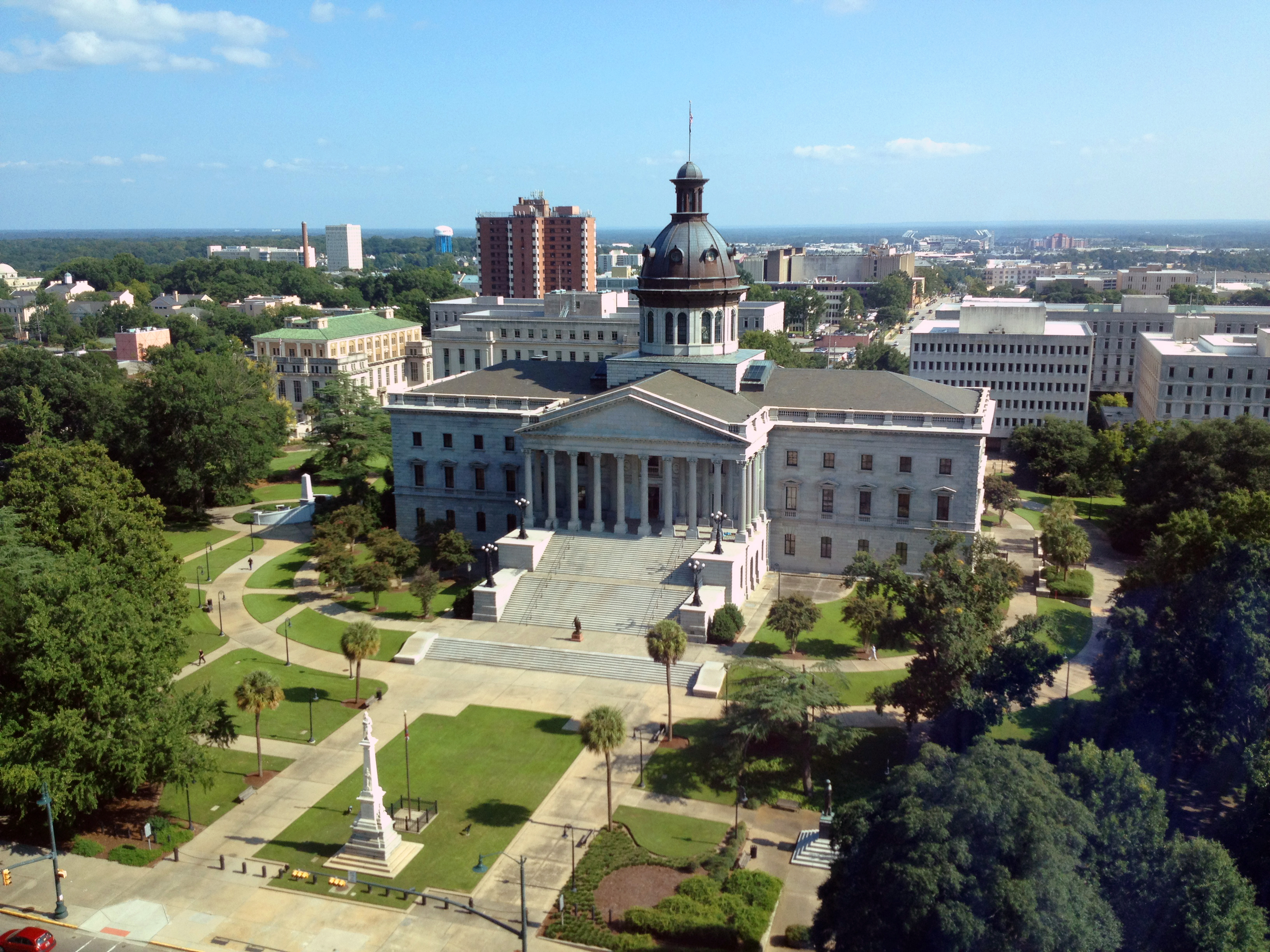
- The South Carolina State House

- Location within South Carolina Location within the United States
- Interactive map showing the location of South Carolina State House
- Location: 1100 Gervais St., Columbia, South Carolina
- Coordinates: 34°0′1.56″N 81°1′59.33″W
- Built: 1855; 171 years ago
- Architect: John R. Niernsee; Et al.
- Architectural style: Classical Revival
- NRHP reference No.: 70000598

Significant dates
- Added to NRHP: June 5, 1970; 56 years ago
- Designated NHL: May 11, 1976; 50 years ago

The South Carolina State House is the building housing the government of the U.S. state of South Carolina, which includes the South Carolina General Assembly and the offices of the Governor and Lieutenant Governor of South Carolina. Located in the capital city of Columbia near the corner of Gervais and Assembly Streets, the building also housed the Supreme Court until 1971.

The State House is in the Classical Revival style; it is approximately 180 feet (55 m) tall, 300 feet (91 m) long, 100 feet (30 m) wide. It weighs more than 70,000 short tons (64,000 t) and has 130,673 square feet (12,140 m^{2}) of space.

== Old South Carolina State House ==
The old State House was constructed between 1786 and 1790. James Hoban, a young Irishman who emigrated to Charleston shortly after the Revolution, was the architect. Upon the recommendation of Henry Laurens, President Washington engaged him to design the executive mansion in Washington. Old pictures of the two buildings show architectural similarities.

The old State House was destroyed during the burning of Columbia in 1865.

== Historic photos ==
Three images of the modern Statehouse
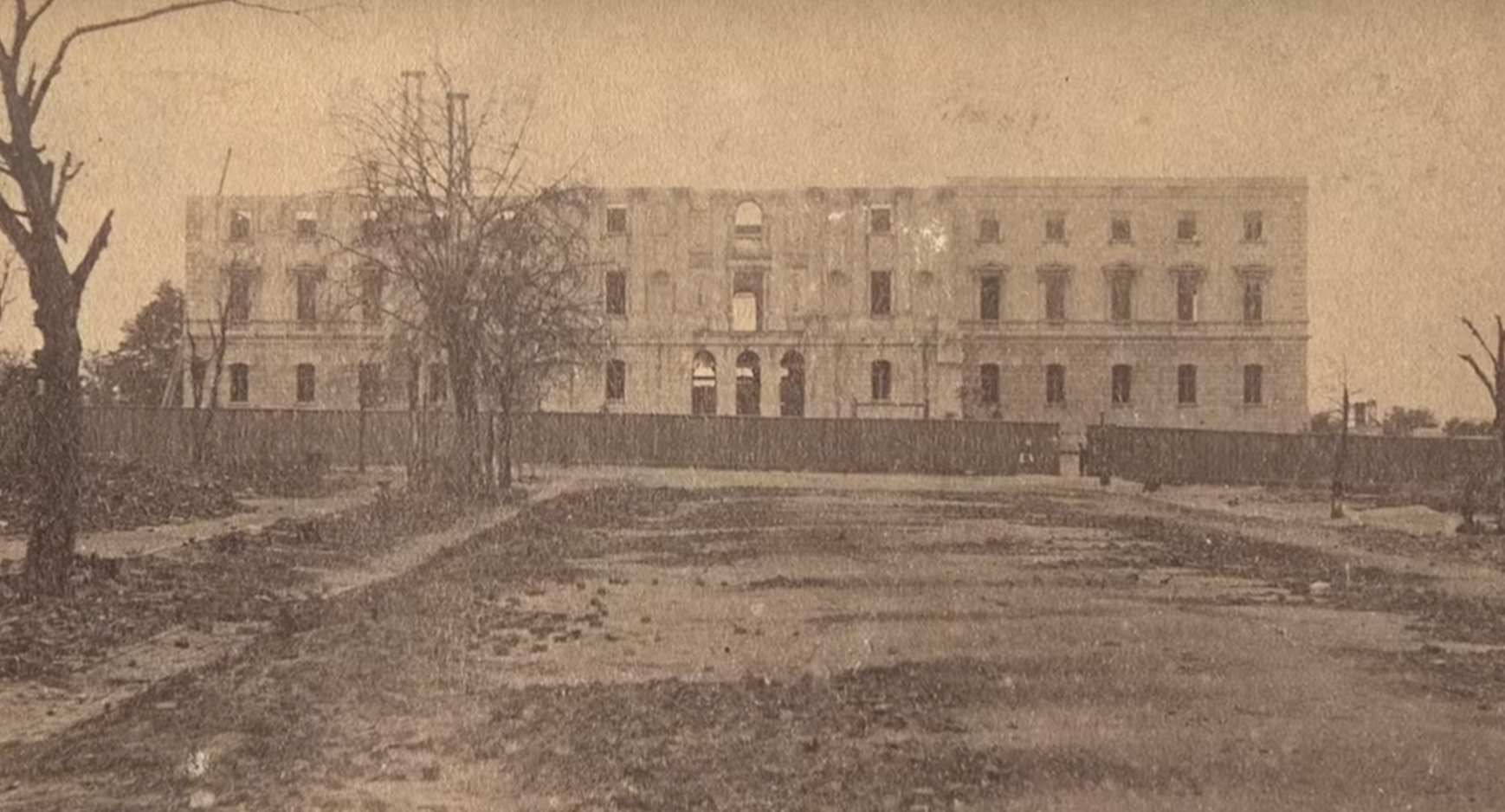
The Statehouse in 1865 after the burning of Columbia during the American Civil War

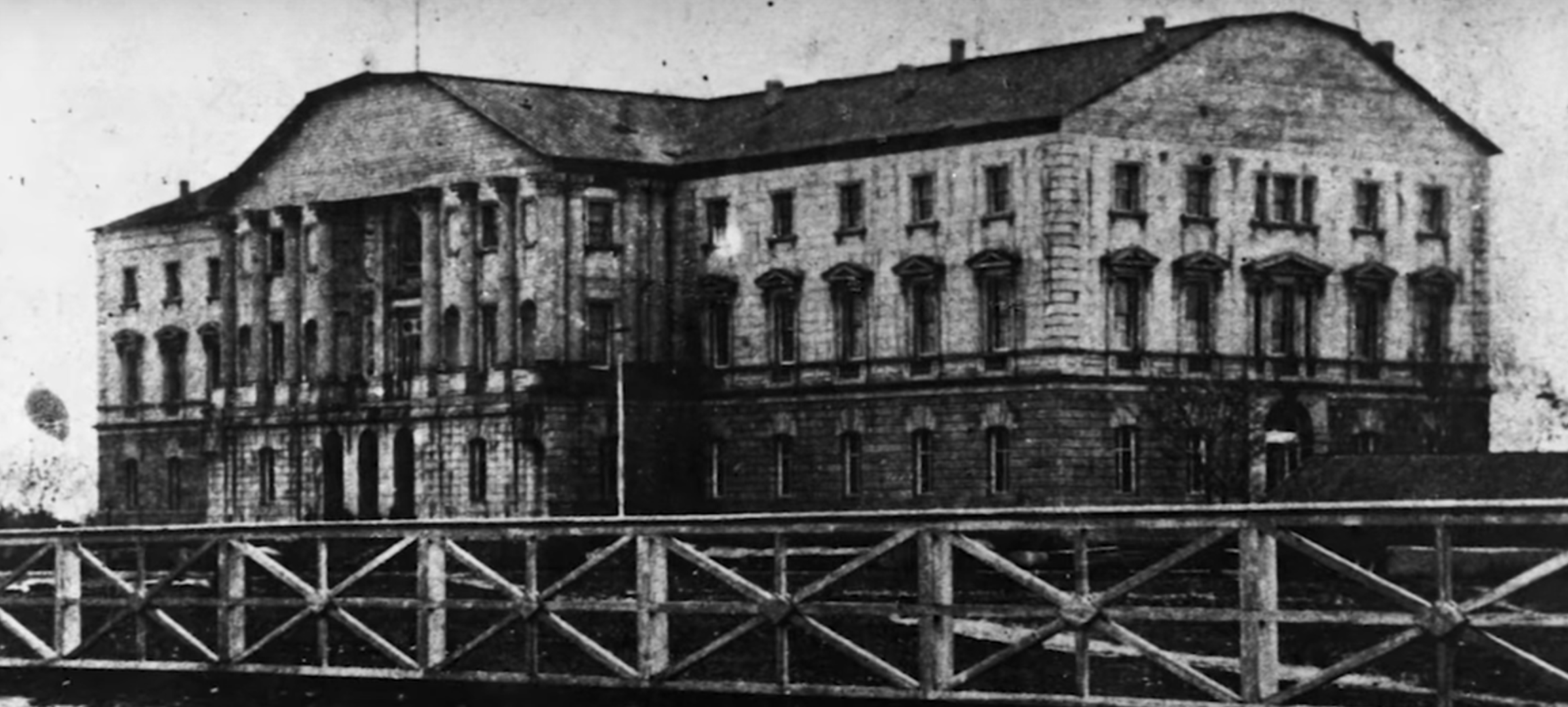
The South Carolina Statehouse in the late 19th century before its dome was constructed

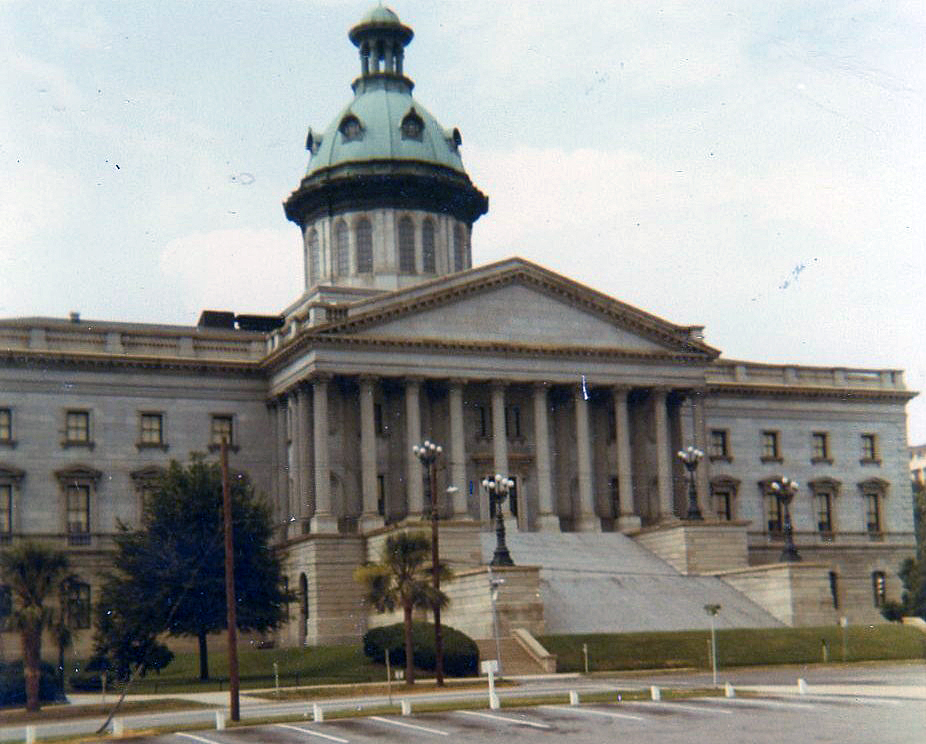
The Statehouse in 1969 before its dome was re-skinned with new copper as part of the 1998 renovation.

== Architecture ==
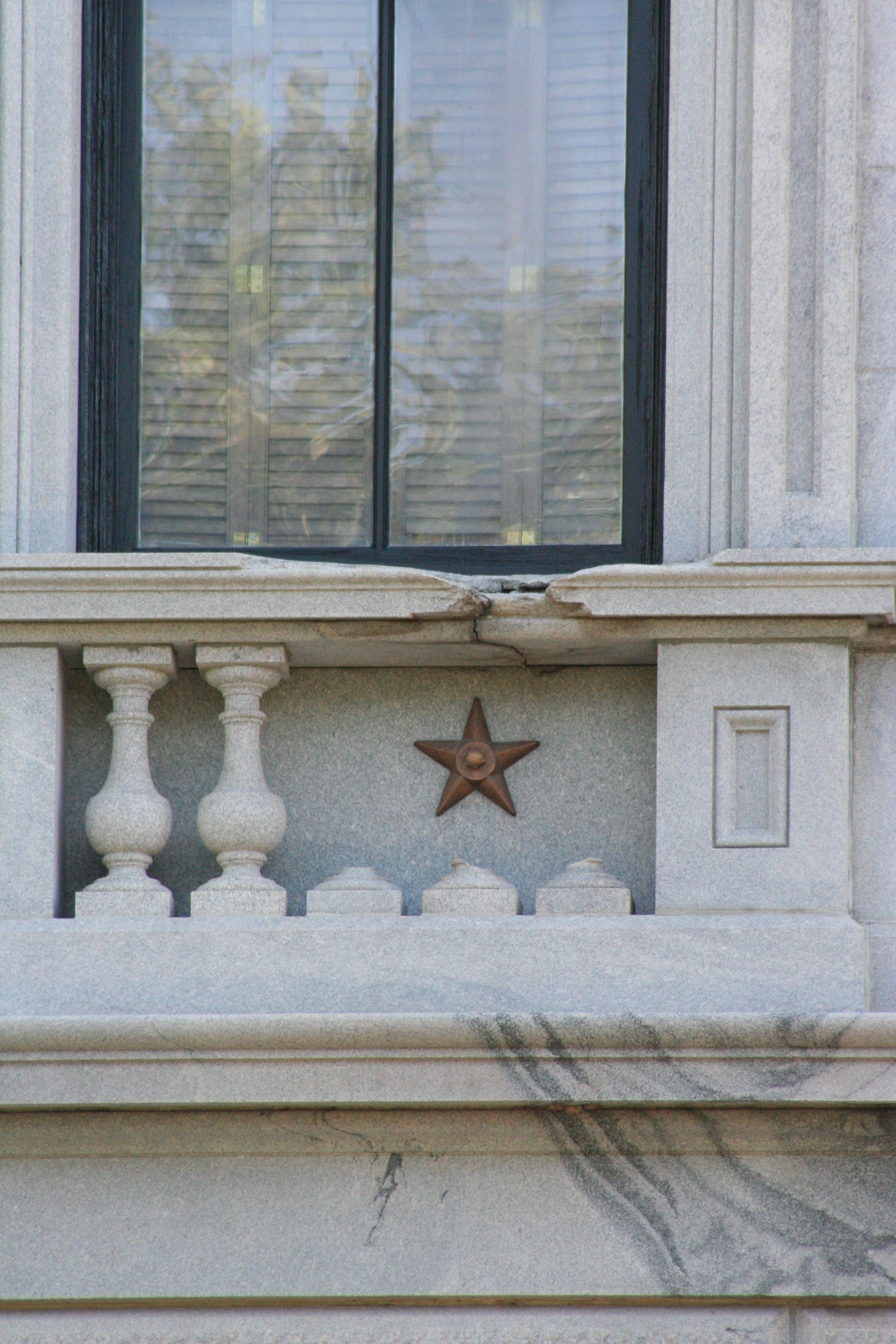
Example of one of the six bronze stars, marking the spots hit by Sherman's cannons

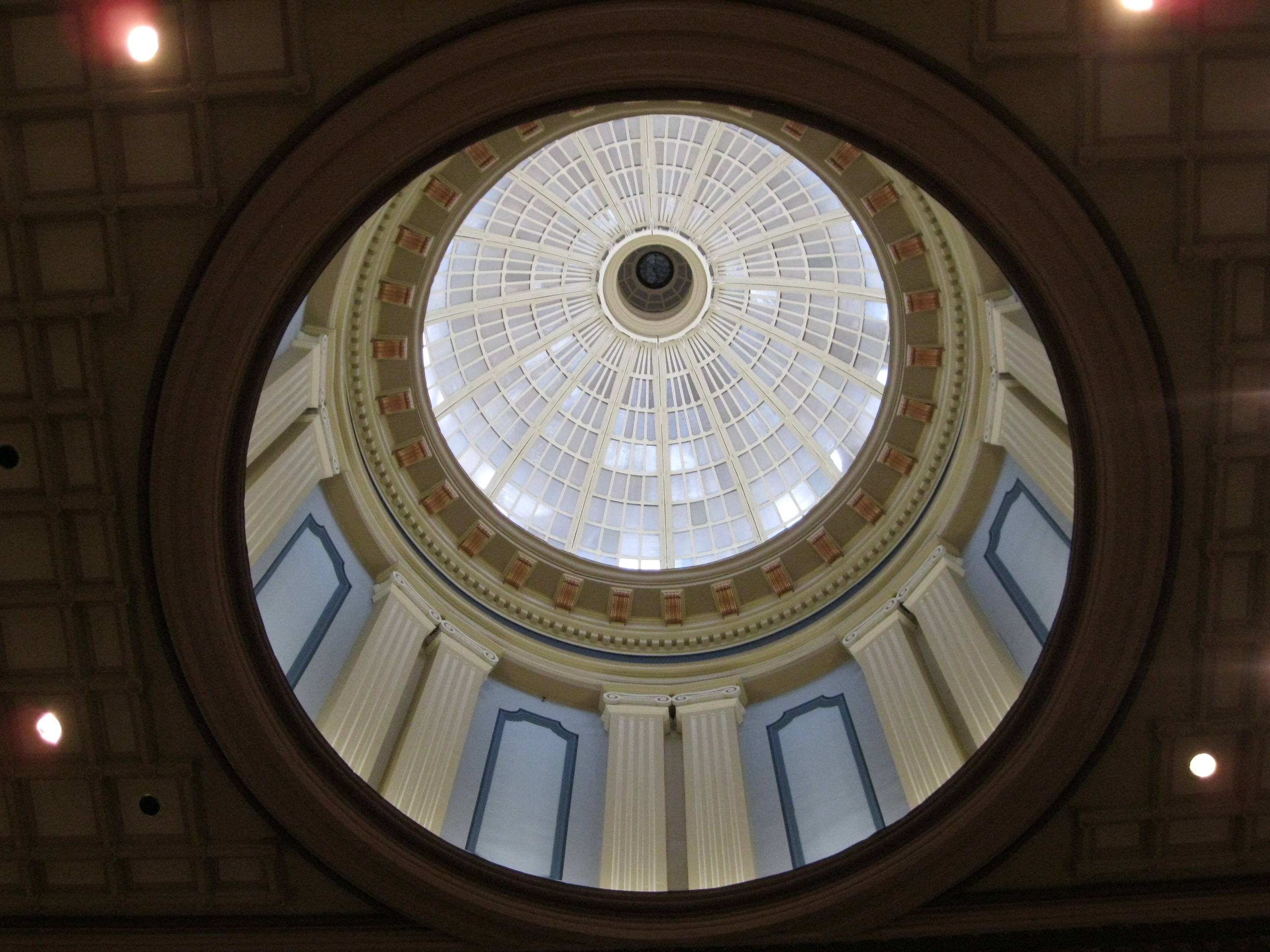
View of inside the dome inside the main lobby

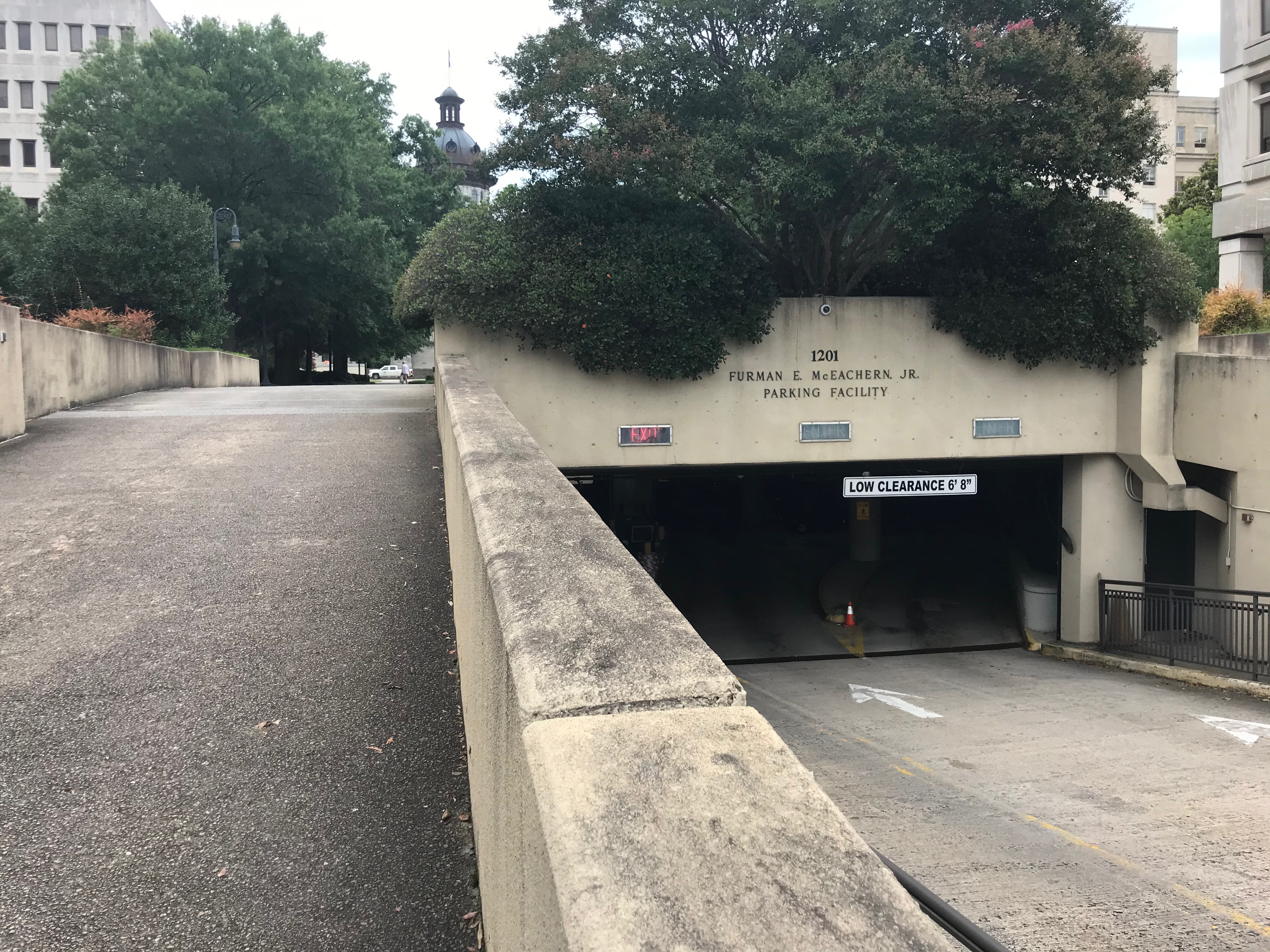
Statehouse underground facility

The South Carolina State House was designed first by architect P. H. Hammarskold. Construction began in 1851, but the original architect was dismissed for fraud and dereliction of duty. Soon thereafter, the structure was largely dismantled because of defective materials and workmanship. John Niernsee redesigned the structure and work began on it in 1855, slowed during the Civil War, and was suspended in 1865 as General W.T. Sherman's U.S. Army entered Columbia on February 17. Several public buildings were "put to the torch" when United States troops entered the city.

The new capitol building, still under construction, was damaged by artillery shells. The old capitol building was set afire by U.S. Army troops under Sherman's command.

Reconstruction-era poverty slowed progress. The building's main structure was finally completed in 1875. From 1888 to 1891, Niernsee's son, Frank McHenry Niernsee, served as architect and much of the interior work was completed. In 1900 Frank Pierce Milburn began as architect, but was replaced in 1905 by Charles Coker Wilson who finally finished the exterior in 1907. Additional renovations were made in 1959 and 1998.

The State House was designated a National Historic Landmark in 1976 for its significance in the post-Civil War Reconstruction Era.

== Grounds ==
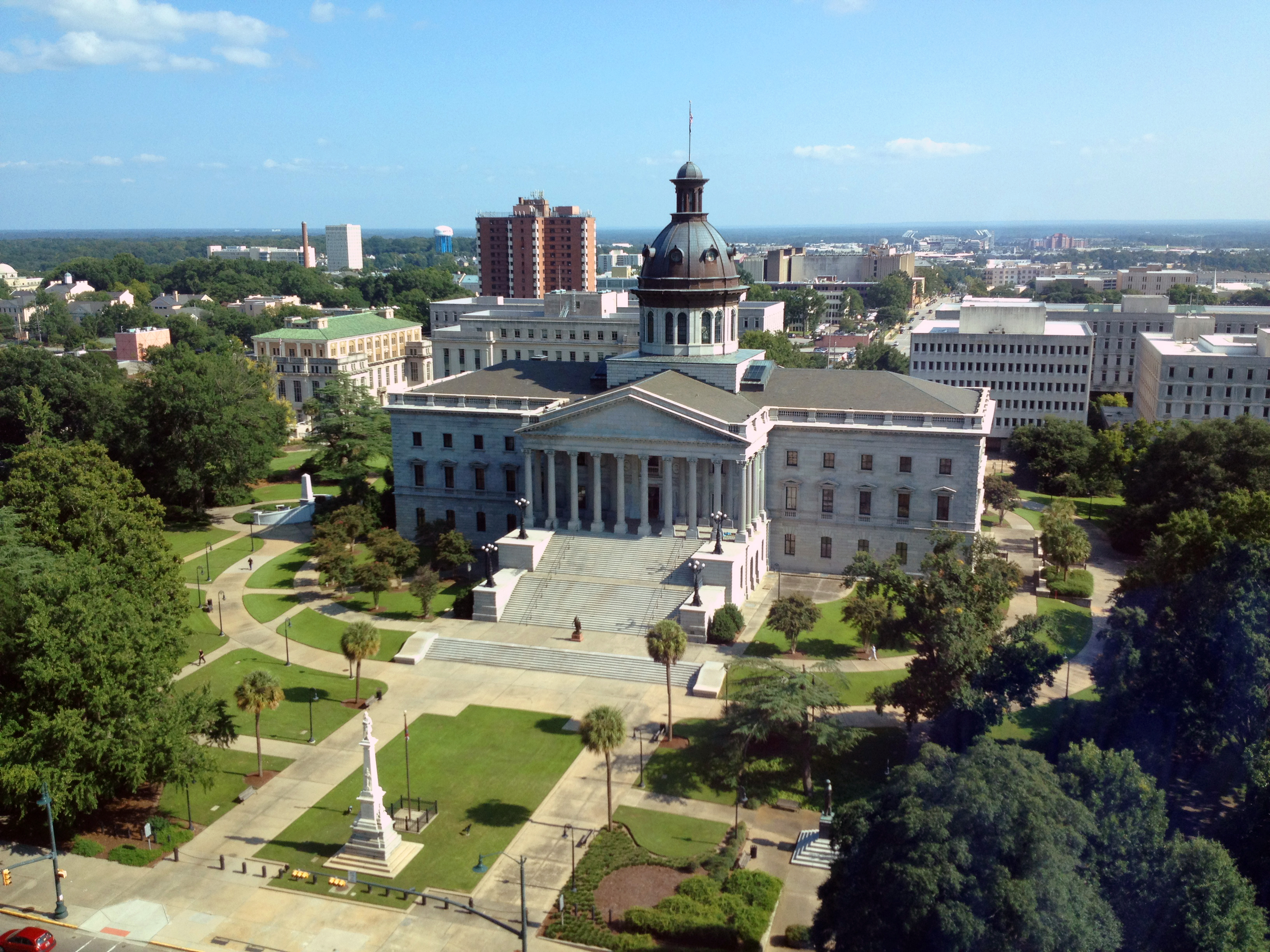
South Carolina State House from the 15th floor of the Main and Gervais Tower

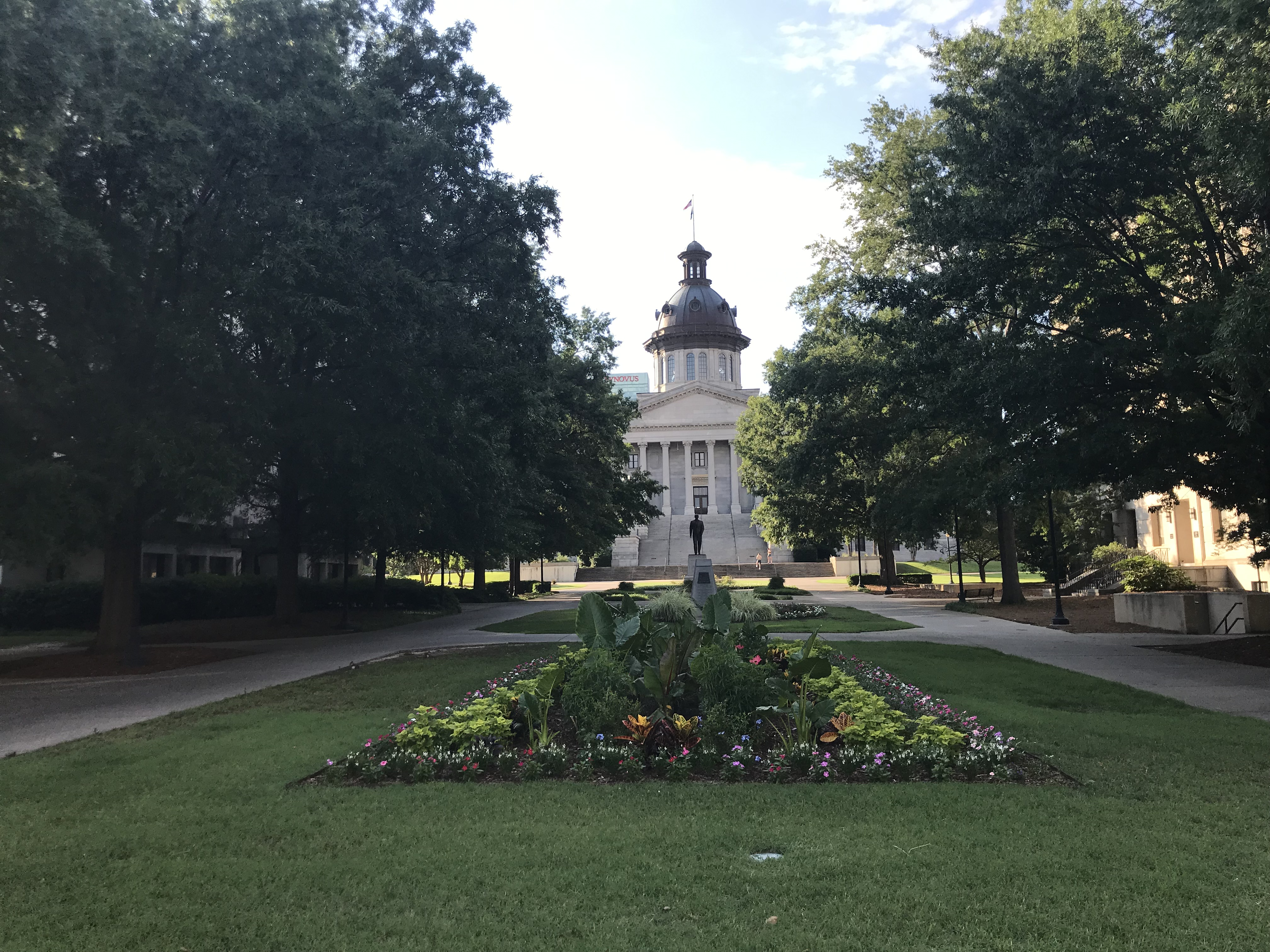
Statehouse grounds from the South

The land around the South Carolina State House has changed dramatically since the construction of the first State House in Columbia in 1786. The grounds were not manicured or designed and the public consistently commented upon the site as a disgrace to the state. With the erection of the current State House in the 1850s at the center of Main (Richardson) Street, the grounds were extended to Sumter Street to the east but remained an active construction site until after the Civil War and the burning of Columbia and the grounds. The state legislatures following Reconstruction were the first to make plans for the grounds' design. Landscape architect Edward Otto Schwagerl drew plans in 1878 for a picturesque plan of winding paths and drives to surround the building; it made no suggestions for the location or erection of monuments, was only partially executed, and was poorly maintained. Complaints about the grounds led the city's Civic Improvement League to design a plan for the grounds' improvement and expansion as part of a City Beautiful master plan for the city from Boston firm Kelsey & Guild in 1904, but it was never executed. Monuments were added to the grounds during this period with little consideration of their overall configuration or relationship to the building and the public continued to complain about the property's condition into the 1960s.

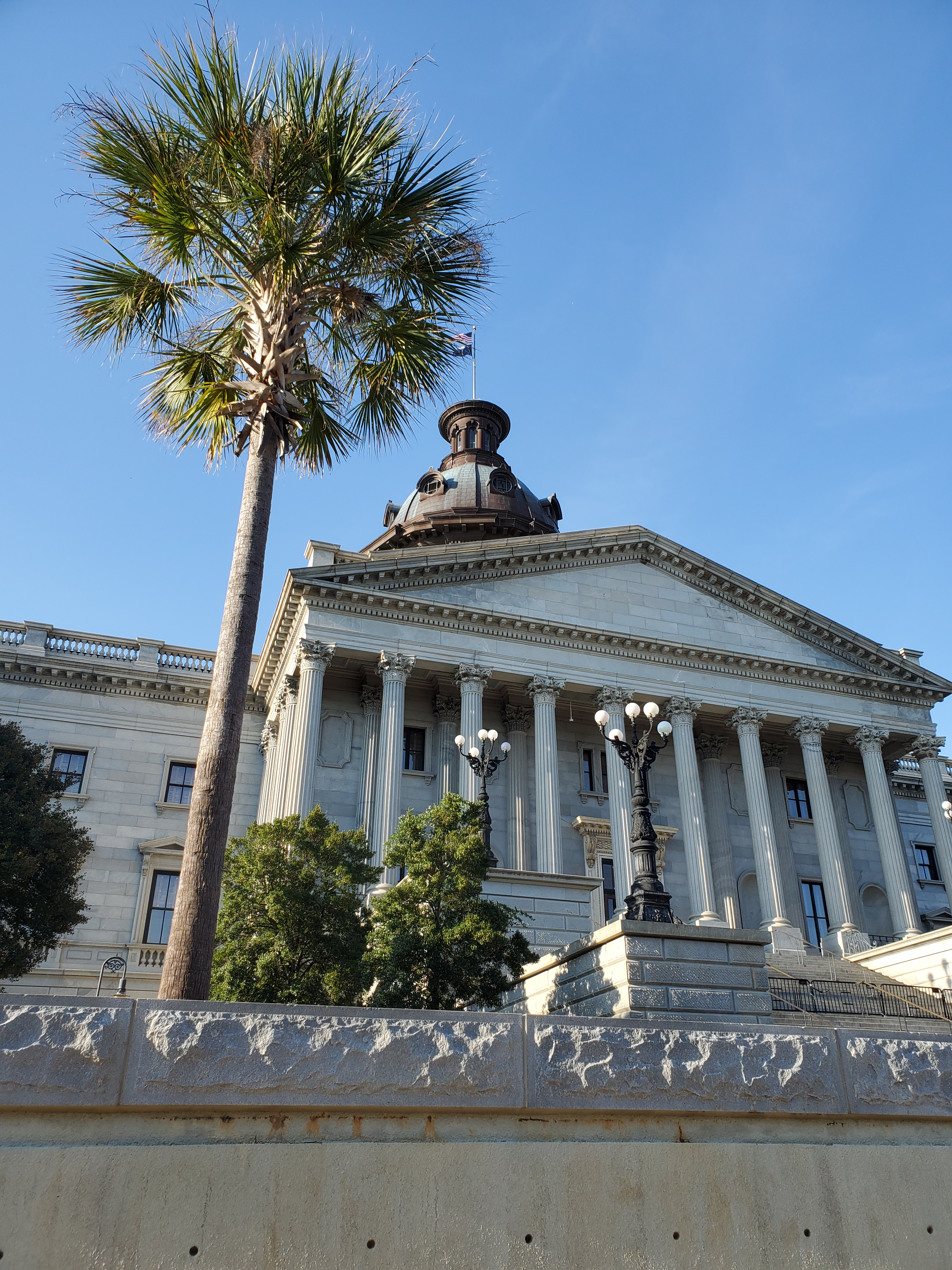
The State House viewed from the south

The grounds also include the following monuments:

- Grave of Swanson Lunsford - buried 1799; markers erected 1837 and 1953. The only person buried on the grounds, Lunsford was a Revolutionary War veteran and an early commissioner of the city of Columbia.
- President George Washington: bronze replica cast in 1857, purchased by South Carolina in 1858; replica of Jean-Antoine Houdon's Washington statue at the Virginia State Capitol. Erected to connect Washington's role as a revolutionary and slaveholder to the politics of South Carolinian planters.
- Palmetto Monument - The legislature appropriate funds for this monument, created by Christopher Werner, in 1856; it is a cast iron and copper palmetto commemorating the Palmetto Regiment, South Carolina's soldiers in the Mexican-American War. South Carolina had a vested interest in the war's outcomes as the acquisition of new territory changed the balance of states in the U.S. Congress.
- Wade Hampton III - This 16-foot bronze equestrian statue of Hampton, a Confederate general and later South Carolina governor and U.S. Senator, was unveiled in November 1906. It was modeled by Frederick W. Ruckstull and represents Hampton as both a commander of the Confederate cavalry (body and horse) and as the state's first post-Reconstruction governor (head). The first major equestrian monument in the state, it celebrates the Lost Cause and the "redemption" of white Democrats over the majority Black Republican legislatures of Reconstruction. The sculpture was moved from its original location on axis with Hampton's grave at Trinity Cathedral on the grounds' northeast side to its current location in 1969.
- Revolutionary War Generals (dedicated 1913): monument sculpted by Frederic W. Ruckstull and commissioned by the South Carolina chapter of the Daughters of the American Revolution; honors Andrew Pickens, Thomas Sumter and Francis Marion.
- South Carolina Monument to the Confederate Dead - This Confederate memorial was erected in 1879, and was unveiled before a crowd of 15,000. The obelisk was designed by Muldoon, Walker and Cobb and the sculpture designed by Carlo Nicoli. The South Carolina Monument Association, a group of white women, originally conceived of the sculpture in 1869 as an early example of Confederate commemoration and the Lost Cause commemoration. They planned it for a different location (Taylor's Hill near the governor's mansion), but the end of Reconstruction and ousting of the biracial, Republican-led state legislature made it possible for the sculpture and obelisk to be erected on the State House grounds. It was installed on the northeast side of the grounds following the 1876 election of Governor Wade Hampton III in a fraudulent and violent election. The statue atop the monument's obelisk was largely destroyed by lightning in 1882, but was replaced by the state two years later and relocated to its current site on axis with the State House's north entrance. A Confederate battle flag flew on a pole behind the monument from 2000 until it was removed in 2015 by a state bill following the murder of nine African Americans at Mother Emanuel AME Church in Charleston. Before 2000, the Confederate flag had flown over the building's dome since the legislature's 1962 concurrent resolution during the commemoration of the Civil War centennial (the resolution failed to designate a time for its removal). The flag was moved near the monument on July 1, 2000, after the passage of the South Carolina Heritage Act and decades of debate and boycotts of the state over the issue. It was then removed from the grounds on July 10, 2015, by order of Republican governor Nikki Haley, and given to the South Carolina Confederate Relic Room & Military Museum.
- Monument to Women of the Confederacy - a bronze Confederate monument, by Frederic W. Ruckstull, erected in 1912 and promoted by the United Confederate Veterans. Originally located on the south steps of the State House, it was moved to the northeast corner of the grounds in 1935 and then to its current location circa 1972.
- Mount for Spanish Cannon - The U.S. government gifted the city of Columbia an eighteenth-century Spanish cannon captured in the July 1898 Battle of Santiago as a monument to the Spanish-American War. It was mounted on the west side of the State House in 1900 on a granite carriage and rested there until the cannon was scrapped during World War II. The mount sits near its original location with plaques that recognize it as a monument to both the Spanish-American War and to the civilian effort during World War II.
- Gun from USS Maine - The city of Columbia erected this gun, retrieved from Havana Harbor in 1910, as a monument to the Spanish-American War in Irwin Park near the Columbia Canal in 1913. It was moved to the State House grounds in 1931 and rededicated with a Confederate battle flag, Union Jack, and U.S. flag draping it as a celebration of the Spanish-American War's reconciliation of Americans from the North and South.
- James F. Byrnes - A monument to this longtime South Carolina politician was erected in 1972 after a private fundraising effort.
- Strom Thurmond - In the late 1990s, the state erected a statue in honor of the former South Carolina governor, U.S. senator, and Dixiecrat candidate for president. The original inscription of the names of Thurmond's children were later altered to include the name of Essie Mae Washington-Williams, the daughter of Thurmond and an African American maid.
- Benjamin Tillman (dedicated 1940) - U.S. Senator; this monument is controversial due to Tillman's virulent racism, support for Jim Crow, and advocacy of terrorizing blacks who attempted to vote during Reconstruction. In 2017, protestors called for its removal.
- Dr. J. Marion Sims - A monument to Sims, a South Carolina physician and pioneer in gynecology, is located on State House grounds near the intersection of Assembly and Gervais streets. This monument is controversial because Sims engaged in surgical experimentation on enslaved women without anesthesia.
- African-American History Monument - authorized by Act 457 of the General Assembly and unveiled on March 26, 2001.
- Law Enforcement Memorial - Erected in 2005, this memorial honors South Carolina law enforcement officers killed while on duty.
- Spanish-American War Veterans Monument - installed on October 22, 1941 and dedicated by the State of South Carolina and the United States Spanish War Veterans. It commemorates the veterans of the Spanish-American War, the Philippine Insurrection and the China Relief Expedition. In 1932, South Carolina veterans of the Spanish-American War proposed the statue as a way to acknowledge how the war united Southerners and Northerners after the Civil War. Theo Alice Ruggles Kitson designed the monument, which is the only female artist-designed monument on the grounds of the State House. The monument is a bronze cast of Kitson's statue The Hiker, which is used in Spanish-American War monuments throughout the United States.

Captain Swanson Lunsford (d. 1799), a Virginia-born American Revolutionary War officer who once owned land that is now part of the State House, is buried on State House grounds, along with a marker erected by his descendants in 1953.

== Statehouse grounds gallery ==
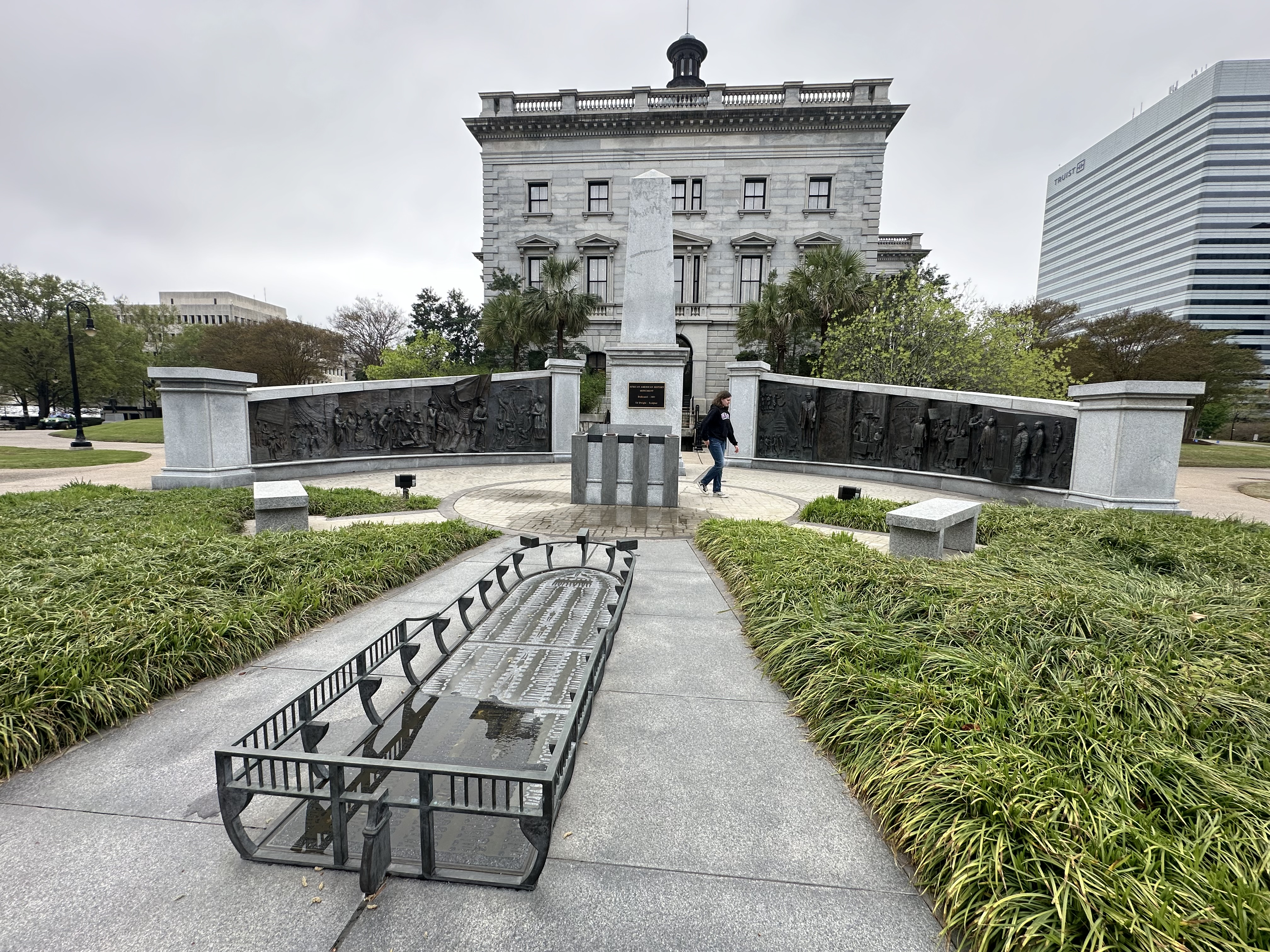
African American History Monument: in the rear, 12 panels depict scenes of Africans' and African Americans’ enslavement, emancipation (represented in the middle by the obelisk), struggle for civil rights, and contemporary achievements. Front and center is a depiction of slave ship containing enslaved people kidnapped in Africa and transported to North America.

== See also ==
- List of South Carolina state legislatures
- Christopher Werner, maker of the "Iron Palmetto"
- List of National Historic Landmarks in South Carolina
- List of state and territorial capitols in the United States
