= Hibernian Hall (Charleston, South Carolina) =

- U.S. National Register of Historic Places
- U.S. National Historic Landmark
- U.S. National Historic Landmark District – Contributing property
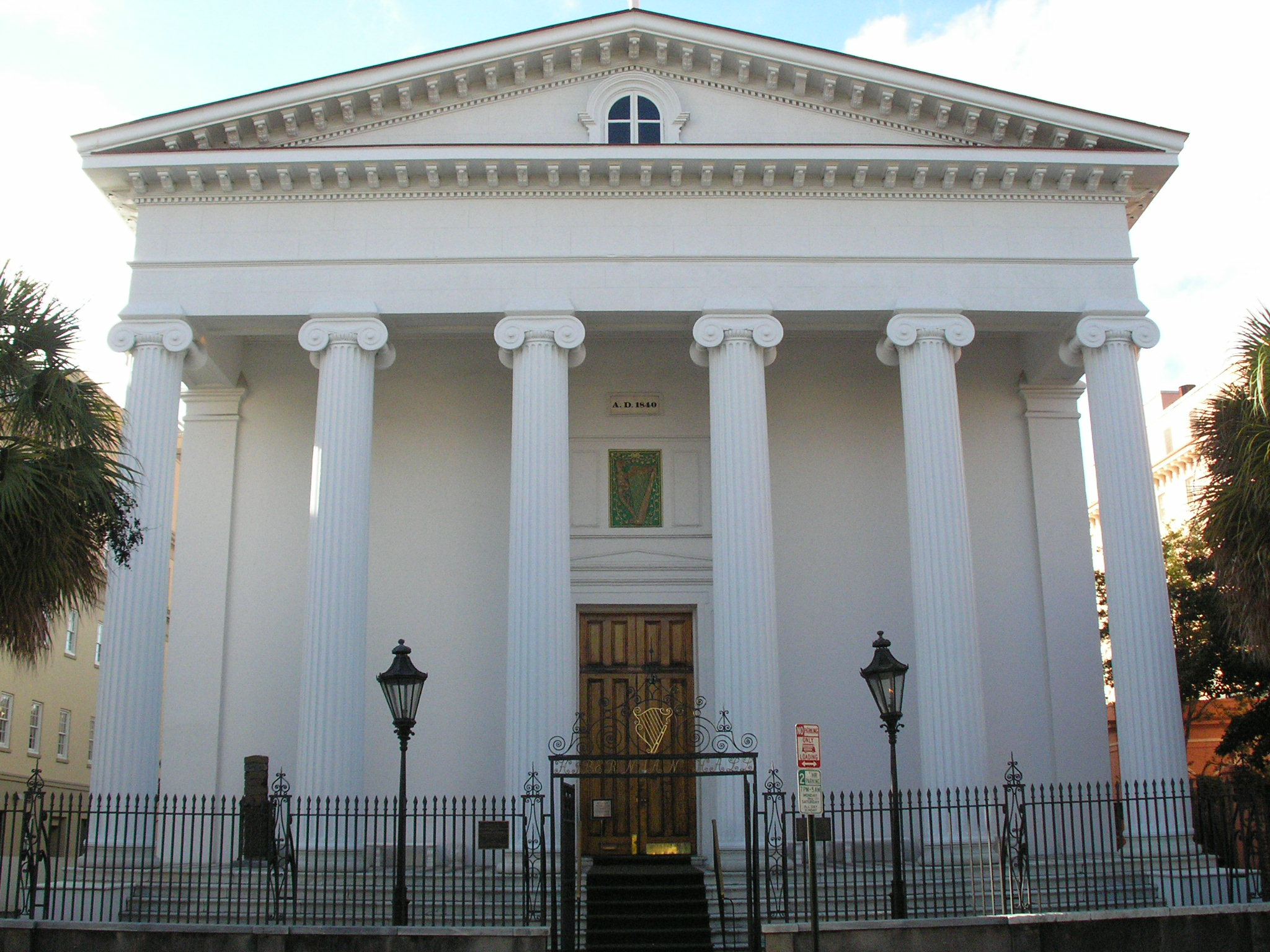

- Location within South Carolina Location within the United States
- Location: 00+ Meeting St., Charleston, South Carolina
- Coordinates: 32°46′38″N 79°55′54″W
- Built: 1840
- Architectural style: Greek Revival
- Part of: Charleston Historic District (ID66000964)
- NRHP reference No.: 73001686

Significant dates
- Added to NRHP: November 7, 1973
- Designated NHL: November 7, 1973
- Designated NHLDCP: October 9, 1960

Hibernian Hall is a historic meeting hall and social venue at 105 Meeting Street in Charleston, South Carolina, United States. Built in 1840, it is Charleston's only architectural work by Thomas Ustick Walter, and a fine example of Greek Revival architecture. The wrought iron gates were made by Christopher Werner, a German-American master ironworker in Charleston.

The hall is nationally significant for its use during the 1860 Charleston Convention, in which the Democratic Party, divided by opinions on slavery, failed to select a presidential nominee, ensuring victory for the anti-slavery Republican Party in the 1860 presidential election. The building was designated as a National Historic Landmark in 1973. The building continues to be used as a function and meeting space today.

== Description and history ==
Hibernian Hall in 1865

Hibernian Hall is located at 105 Meeting Street, just north of the intersection of Meeting and Broad Street in central Charleston, an intersection known as the "Four Corners of Law". The hall was constructed in 1840 to a design by Thomas U. Walter of Philadelphia for the Hibernian Society of Charleston, an Irish benevolent society. This group had organized in 1801, made up largely of Irish immigrants. This is the only known work of Walter's in Charleston.

It is a two-story brick structure, clad in white-painted stucco, its principal architectural feature a Greek temple front with six Ionic columns, supporting an entablature and pediment. The architect modeled the columns and entablature on those of the Temple of Illisius. Master artisan Christopher Werner crafted the iron gates.

The classical effect was modified in the late 19th century by the addition of dentils and modillions to the cornice, and the insertion of an arched Italianate window into the tympanum of the pediment. These alterations were made during repairs and restoration after the building was damaged in the 1886 Charleston earthquake.

Hibernian Hall is the only remaining building associated with the 1860 Democratic National Convention, one of the most critical political gatherings in United States history. The building served as convention headquarters for the faction of the Democratic Party supporting presidential candidate Stephen A. Douglas. The first floor was used as a meeting space, and the second floor as living quarters for the delegates, who slept on hundreds of cots set up for the occasion. None of the candidates could garner sufficient support, and the party's divisiveness contributed its defeat by the Republicans and Abraham Lincoln.

== See also ==
- List of National Historic Landmarks in South Carolina
- National Register of Historic Places listings in Charleston, South Carolina
