= Select Registry =

Select Registry, Distinguished Inns of North America, is a non-profit association of more than 300 country inns, B&Bs and boutique hotels throughout the United States. Founded in 1972, the association is based in Greensboro, Georgia, United States and led by CEO Mark Reichle.

== History ==
The association was founded in 1972 by travel writer Norman Simpson, who traveled throughout North America identifying places that offered what he called, "good honest lodging, good honest food, and good honest feeling." Through his book, Country Inns and Back Roads, Simpson documented this group of properties in the U.S. and Canada. The association of independent innkeepers started by Simpson is now known as Select Registry.

Originally based in Berkshire, New England, the organization is headquartered Greensboro, Georgia. Select Registry has a diverse membership which includes bed and breakfasts, urban inns, boutique hotels and small resorts. Members are required to pay annual dues, as well as pass quality assurance inspections every few years. Board of Directors made up of member inn owners govern the chief executive officer. 2022 will mark the organization's 50th anniversary.

== Guidebook ==
Simpson's Country Inns and Back Roads was updated in Select Registry's annual guidebook, whose 25th edition was printed in 2013. The publication featured all member properties, categorized by state or province.

The association now publishes a travel and lifestyle magazine, Inn Scene which offers a detailed description of all of member properties, as well as travel related stories and features. The bi-annual magazine's third edition was published in Fall/Winter 2021.

Select Registry's members must submit applications in order to qualify for inspections by professional evaluators. According to the association's guidelines members are removed if they do not meet the standards for "hospitality, attention to detail, amenities and food".
