= List of tallest buildings in Columbia, South Carolina =

The history of high-rise buildings in Columbia, South Carolina began with the construction of the National Loan and Exchange Bank Building in 1903. A decade later, the Palmetto Building was built across the street, becoming the tallest in the state. During the 1970s and 80s, Columbia experienced a building boom, which brought economic growth to the region, including several of the city's tallest buildings.

The following table shows the fifteen tallest buildings in Columbia, South Carolina.

== Tallest buildings ==
Rank	Name	Image	Height ft / m	Floors	Year	Notes
1	Capitol Center		349 / 106	26	1987	Tallest building in Columbia and South Carolina since its completion in 1987.
2	Hub at Columbia		325 / 99	20	1983	Tallest building in Columbia and South Carolina from 1983 to 1987, and is currently the 3rd-tallest building in South Carolina. The building is primarily used for University of South Carolina student housing.
3	Bank of America Plaza		305 / 93	18	1989	3rd-tallest building in Columbia.
4	Tower at 1301 Gervais		278 / 85	20	1973	Was the tallest building in Columbia from 1973 to 1983. It is the tallest building in the city not located on the Main Street corridor. Tallest building constructed in Columbia in the 1970s.
5	Main and Gervais		270 / 82	18	2009	The most recently constructed office tower in Columbia. Tallest building constructed in Columbia in the 2000s.
6	Finlay House		250 / 76	19	1965	Tallest building constructed in Columbia in the 1960s.
7	The Meridian Building		250 / 76	17	2004	Features a distinctive crowning trellis on 17th floor.
8	1441 Main / Wells Fargo Tower		250 / 76	16	1988	The Midlands headquarters of Wells Fargo.
9	The Heritage		245 / 75	19	1976	
10	Senate Plaza Apartments		241 / 73	19	1965	
11	Capstone House		232 / 71	18	1967	Has a rotating restaurant on the top (18th) floor that reused from the Gas Pavilion at the New York Worlds Fair, houses the offices of the University of South Carolina Capstone Scholars.
12	Palmetto Building		215 / 66	15	1913	The oldest skyscraper in South Carolina and Columbia, now houses the Sheraton Hotel. Upon completion, it was the tallest building in South Carolina.
13	Cornell Arms Apartments		210 / 64	18	1948	Housed a nuclear fallout shelter in its basement.
14	Marion Street Apartments		208 / 63	17	1975	
15	USC South Tower		205 / 62	18	1965	Second-tallest building on the University of South Carolina campus.

=== Under construction ===
The following table includes buildings under construction in Columbia that are planned to be at least 200 ft (61 m) tall as of 2025, based on standard height measurement. The “Year” column indicates the expected year of completion. Buildings that are on hold are not included.

Name	Height ft (m)	Floors	Year	Notes
ōLiv Columbia	290 (88)	26	2028	Groundbreaking started in December 2025 with completion planned for 2028. The complex includes a 240 unit 26 story market rate apartment tower for professional workers, a 2352-bed 22 story tower for University of South Carolina students, and a 15-story 1600 stall parking garage for tenants and nearby office workers. Amenities include a fitness center, outside pool, and bike storage for residents. The $225 million complex is the first high rise for rent project located Downtown and largest student housing addition to the city.

== See also ==
- List of tallest buildings in South Carolina
