= Ashley House =

Ashley House may refer to:

- Ashley House (Paget Parish, Bermuda), a 17th-century cottage in Bermuda
- Dr. George Ashley House, a historic house in Paris, Idaho
- Ashley House (Fall River, Massachusetts), an historic house in Fall River, Massachusetts
- Colonel John Ashley House in Sheffield, Massachusetts
- Ashley House (Charleston, South Carolina), high rise in Charleston, South Carolina
- Ashley House (TV presenter), British television presenter
