= List of tallest buildings in South Carolina =

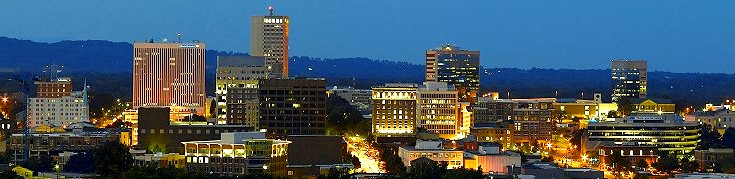
A view of the Greenville skyline at night.

This list ranks South Carolina buildings that stand at least 250 feet (76 m) tall, based on standard height measurement. This includes spires and architectural details but does not include antenna masts or other objects not part of the original plans. Existing structures are included for ranking purposes based on present height. The tallest structure in the state is an uninhabitable tower in Abbeville County. Since the structure is not classified as a building, however, it is not included on this list.

== Tallest buildings ==
Rank	Name	Image	Height ft (m)	Floors	Year	City	Notes
1	Capitol Center		349 (106)	26	1987	Columbia	Has been the tallest building in Columbia and the state of South Carolina since its completion in 1987.
2	Margate Tower		329 (100)	29	2004	Myrtle Beach	Tallest building in Myrtle Beach and more above-ground floors than any building in the state. However, the Gateway Project in Greenville, South Carolina is expected to match its amount of above-ground floors when completed.
3	The Hub at Columbia		325 (99)	20	1983	Columbia	Tallest building in Columbia and South Carolina from 1983 to 1987, and is currently the 3rd-tallest building in South Carolina.
4	Bank of America Plaza		305 (93)	18	1989	Columbia	3rd tallest building in Columbia, 4th tallest in the state.
5	Landmark Building		305 (93)	25	1966	Greenville	Tallest building in South Carolina from 1966 to 1983. Tallest building in Greenville.
6	Tower at 1301 Gervais		278 (85)	20	1973	Columbia	Tallest building in Columbia from 1973 to 1983.
7	Tower at Main and Gervais		270 (82)	19	2009	Columbia	Newest constructed tower in Columbia.
8	Hilton Ocean Grand Enclaves		260 (79)	27	2019	Myrtle Beach	Tallest hotel in Myrtle Beach and newest skyscraper.
9	St. Matthew's German Evangelical Lutheran Church		255 (78)	2	1872	Charleston	Tallest building in South Carolina from 1872 to 1966. Tallest building in Charleston.
10	Denny's Tower		250 (76)	18	1990	Spartanburg	Tallest building in Spartanburg. Headquarters for Denny's, and also serves as a restaurant.

== See also ==
- List of tallest buildings in the United States
- List of tallest buildings by U.S. state
- List of tallest buildings in Columbia, South Carolina
