= Lyles, Bissett, Carlisle, and Wolff =

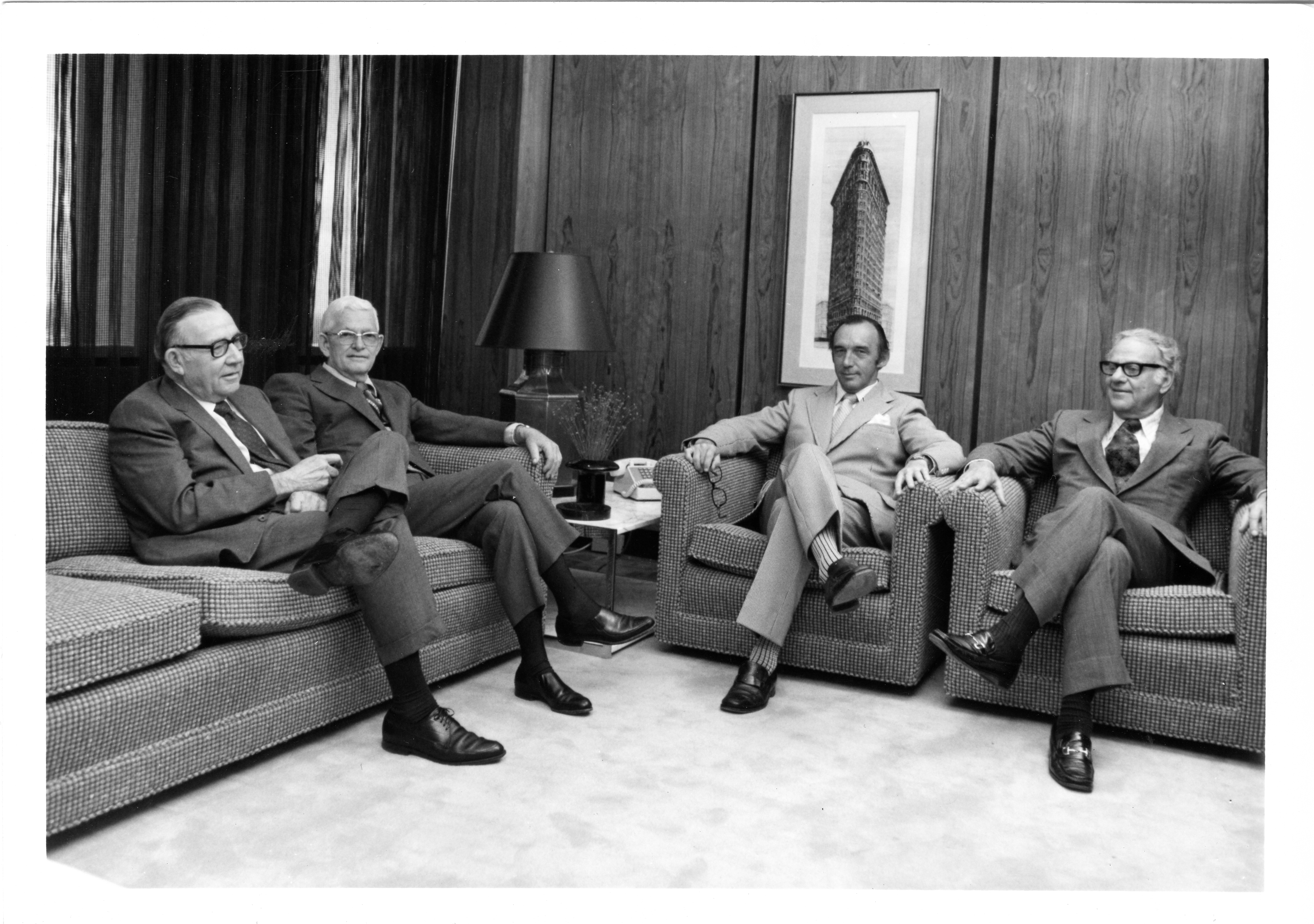
Lyles, Bissett, Carlisle, and Wolff

Lyles, Bissett, Carlisle, and Wolff (LBC&W), an architecture firm based in Columbia, South Carolina, was the region's most prominent firm from 1948 until 1975. While the roots of the firm stretch back to 1938, LBC&W was officially incorporated in 1948 as William G. Lyles, Thomas J. Bissett, William A. Carlisle, and Louis M. Wolff. LBC&W's streamlined operational structure, atypically high employment numbers, and varied portfolio contributed to the success of the firm. The firm had satellite offices in Richmond, Virginia; Washington, D.C.; Spartanburg, South Carolina; Raleigh, North Carolina; and Rockville, Maryland. At its height, over 350 architects, engineers, and other staff members were employed by LBC&W. The firm completed over 7,000 projects in its 30-year span, many of which were on the cutting edge of Modern architecture. From Clemson University's library that reflects the influence of Edward Durell Stone's Embassy at New Delhi to the Bankers Trust Tower in downtown Columbia that mimics the Seagram Building by Mies van der Rohe, LBC&W incorporated the methodologies and designs of the great architects of the twentieth century. LBC&W designed some of South Carolina's – and certainly Columbia's – most prominent commercial and private buildings, contributing greatly to the modern built environment of Columbia today.

== History ==
=== 1938-1948 ===
In 1938, William Lyles and Robert Caughman Stork began the firm Stork & Lyles. Robert Stork suffered a severe cerebral hemorrhage a few years earlier, however, and did not recover enough to carry a full workload alongside Lyles. Bill Stork, the brother of Robert, returned to South Carolina from Washington D.C. where he had been working and continued with the firm Stork and Lyles. Bill Stork and Lyles, who were both graduates of Clemson University's architecture program, were interrupted by World War II. In February 1942, Lyles was transferred to Washington D.C. as a member of the General Staff of the War Department. He attained the rank of captain in April 1942, and by June of that year, Lyles was on his way to Europe as the chief of design for the chief engineer of the European Theater of Operations. He was responsible for the design of camps and hospitals in the European theater for forty-one months. On November 13, 1945, Lyles returned to Columbia and resumed his work with Stork. At this time, the firm was working in a small space above McGregor's Drug Store. Stork and Lyles began working in 1946 with T.J. Bissett, William Carlisle, and Louis Wolff as associates. Around 1948, Stork left the firm, and the firm became officially incorporated as William G. Lyles, Bissett, Carlisle, and Wolff, which was later shortened to Lyles, Bissett, Carlisle, and Wolff.

In 1948, LBC&W designed and began to build a new office complex at 1321 Bull Street to accommodate its continuously growing staff. The architects were relieved to leave the cramped conditions of the rooms above McGregor's Drug Store.

=== 1948-1960 ===
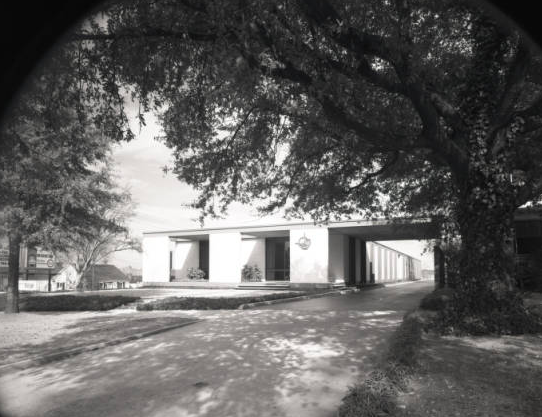
1800 Gervais Street, second LBC&W office, 1960-1974

LBC&W's success in later years can be attributed in part to their early connections with the Federal Housing Administration through Bill Stork. The firm's projects during the late '40s and early '50s were primarily residential buildings insured under the FHA's section 608 policy, which was aimed at ensuring housing for veterans. LBC&W was by far the most active firm under the section 608 program in South Carolina. In tangent with this program, LBC&W completed 22 projects insured by the FHA at $16,836,400 by the end of the program in 1950. The closest competition was David Cevil of Spartanburg with a mere six projects insured at $3,492,500. Stork and Lyles completed only one FHA project of which $195,900 was insured by the FHA. Stork is reported to have completed three projects on his own, of which $1,381,500 was FHA insured.

By 1950, the firm had grown to 58 people. During this period, the architects worked to diversify their portfolio after the postwar housing boom began to subside. The architects were successful in their diversification, and by the end of the 1950s, could list many different types of buildings in the company's portfolio such as libraries, science laboratories, office buildings, schools, and military facilities.

=== 1960-1970s ===
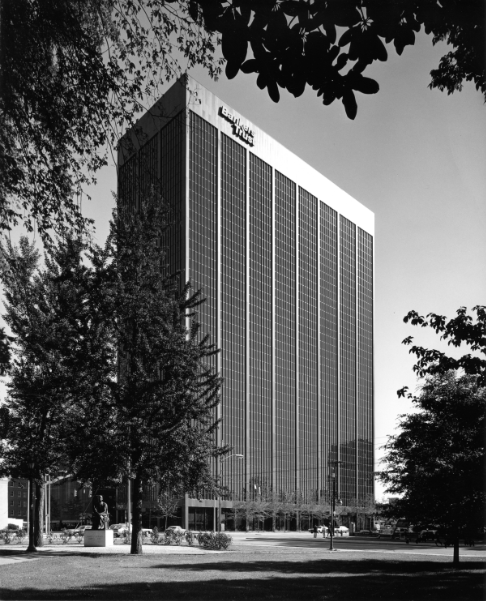
Third LBC&W office, 1301 Gervais Street 1974

In 1960, the firm moved to a new larger office designed by the firm to accommodate a growing staff. The 1960s were a critical period for LBC&W as they solidified their design philosophy, which was centered around their concept of "Total Design." This design philosophy embodied modern ideals about functionality, beauty, and client satisfaction. During this decade, the firm began their expansion outside of South Carolina. Offices in Washington D.C. were opened in 1960, and in later years the firm opened offices in Virginia, Maryland, and North Carolina.

LBC&W entered the 1970s with continuing growth and merged with CE-TEC, a professional service division of Combustion Engineering. The firm continued to win many awards for their work. They received awards from the American Institute of Architects for the Carolina Coliseum in 1970 and the U.S. Post Office in Florence, South Carolina, 1976. In April 1974, the firm moved into four of the twenty-one floors of the Bankers Trust Tower they designed. In addition to LBC&W's geographic reach, the firm's design versatility was critical to their significant place in the history of Modern architecture.

By the late 1970s, the firm had been involved in more than 7,000 projects. Their buildings included elementary, middle, and high schools, collegiate dorms, libraries, student unions, government complexes, office buildings, post offices, military facilities, private homes, apartment complexes, factories, corporate headquarters, and at least one fallout shelter. The majority of these structures were built in a Modernist style. However, several buildings such as the Palmetto Club in Downtown Columbia and several single family residences were designed in the traditional Colonial Revival style that was also popular throughout the twentieth century. Even with projects for more conservative clients, the firm was able to adhere to its principles of design while taking into account the needs of their patrons.

LBC&W was dissolved in the late 1970s. Lyles’ retirement in 1974 followed by Bissett's in 1975 and the economic recession – compounded with LBC&W's illegal financial contribution to the Nixon campaign – most likely led to the breakup of the firm. Articles in The State newspaper report that LBC&W was still receiving bids in 1977, but by 1980, LBC&W was referred to as “the now-dissolved firm.”

LBC&W was able to transform the built environment of the South into a Modernist landscape. Its magnitude and versatility, coupled with its atypical organizational structure and breadth of work gave it the competitive edge needed to reshape the skyline of the South time and again.

== Principal architects ==
Each partner, except Bill Lyles, began his career outside of South Carolina. Therefore, the unified LBC&W had ties to existing corporations and firms across the United States. The senior partners were collectively licensed to practice architecture in South Carolina, North Carolina, Georgia, Washington DC, Kentucky, Mississippi, Alabama, Florida, Arkansas, Virginia, Maryland, New Jersey, Pennsylvania, Delaware, and Tennessee.

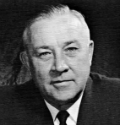
William Lyles

William G. Lyles (1913-1981) was born in Whitmire, South Carolina, on October 23, 1913. He earned a Bachelor of Science degree in architecture from Clemson College in 1934. He was the lead designer and partner, with his brother-in-law Robert C. Stork, at Stork & Lyles from 1938 to 1942 and 1945 to 1948. From 1940 until 1945, he served on active duty with the U.S. Army. He was a constructing quartermaster at Fort Gordon, Georgia, and the head of the design and engineering section of the Office of the Chief Engineers in Europe. He served as the president, vice president, and secretary of the South Carolina chapter of the American Institute of Architects (AIA), as well as president of the Clemson Architectural Foundation. Lyles was also one of the founding members of the Richland County Historic Preservation Commission. He wrote several articles for professional journals discussing his architecture philosophy and the firm's projects. These articles included "Lift Slab Construction Saves Clemson Time and Money" in the Consulting Engineer in 1954, and "Principles of Economic Feasibility for Architectural Projects" in 1962 in the AIA Journal. Within LBC&W, he headed the administration and legal services.

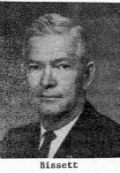
Thomas Bissett

Thomas J. Bissett (1909-1992) was born in Tampa, Florida, on December 30, 1909. He graduated from Clemson College with a Bachelor of Science degree in architecture in 1934. He was a member of the AIA and served as director of the South Carolina chapter for a number of years. Prior to his tenure at LBC&W he served as a draftsman for the firm of Frank Frimmer in Tampa, Florida, from 1935 to 1936. He was chief draftsman with the firm of Lester Avery in Miami, Florida, from 1936 to 1941. While on active duty in the U.S. Army from 1942 until 1946, he held the rank of major with the Transportation Corps. In addition to his role as senior partner in Columbia, he also acted as executive director and treasurer of the firm. Within the firm, he was in charge of production and engineering.

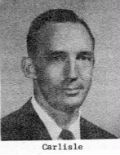
William A. Carlisle

William A. Carlisle (1918-1999) was born in West Point, Georgia, on July 11, 1918. He earned a Bachelor of Science degree in architecture from Clemson College in 1939. Prior to LBC&W, he had 25 years of architecture experience practicing in Durham, North Carolina, and Fort Jackson, South Carolina. Carlisle was a second lieutenant with the 32nd Infantry Division and was a draftsman and engineer in the southwest Pacific during his active duty with the U.S. Army from 1942 to 1945. He served as president and vice president of the South Carolina chapter of the AIA and as president of the Clemson Architectural Foundation. At LBC&W, he acted as vice president and spent the majority of his time in the field in a supervisory capacity.

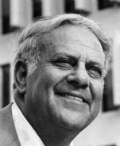
Louis M. Wolff

Louis M. Wolff (1910-1977) was born in Allendale, South Carolina, on December 25, 1910. He majored in architecture and engineering at Clemson College, earning a Bachelor of Science in architecture in 1931. Wolff continued his education at the University of Pennsylvania, earning a Bachelor of Arts in architecture in 1933. Prior to LBC&W, Wolff worked as a draftsman in Flint, Michigan, from 1933 until 1934, the senior foreman for the State Park Division in Myrtle Beach, South Carolina, from 1934 to 1936, and an associate with Buckler and Fenhagen in Baltimore, Maryland from 1936 until 1940. He served with the Corps of Engineering during World War II, 1940 through 1946. He was appointed the chief of Oise Military Labor Service near Reims, France in 1945, where he supervised over 227,000 German prisoners of war in the reconstruction of France. Wolff served as president, vice president, and secretary of the South Carolina chapter of the AIA, and was president of the Clemson Architectural Foundation. He wrote an article for the South Carolina Magazine in 1953, "Modern Architecture: Its Purposes and Aims," in which he discussed his personal design philosophy. Wolff served as secretary and head of design of LBC&W. He died in 1977 in Columbia.

== Organization ==
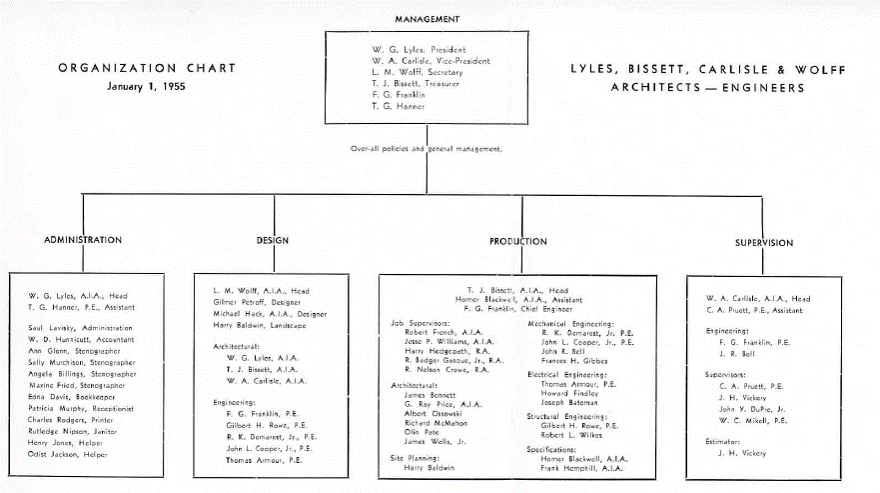
LBC&W Organizational Chart

The sheer size and organizational structure of LBC&W was impressive. Each of the firm's senior partners functioned as the heads of four separate operational departments, which created an assembly line mechanism during the design process. This structure allowed LBC&W to take on multiple projects at one time. Bill Lyles oversaw administration and legal services. T.J. Bissett organized production and engineering. Bill Carlisle functioned as an on-site supervisory agent. Louis Wolff directed design. It was unusual for an architectural firm to be broken up this way. One source alludes to the fact that the divisions applied at the firm sprang from the senior partners’ days in the military. With each step of the process handled by a designated sector, LBC&W had the ability to address every detail in planning more fully than a smaller, more conglomerate firm could do.

== Design philosophy ==
LBC&W's logo was designed by William Hirsch, a sculptor from Charleston, SC.

By the 1960s, the firm began to articulate its design philosophy, called "Total Design," through promotional literature. Advertising its philosophy, LBC&W said: "Design means welding all conditions and influences into the most practical plan. Above all the plan must be functional, serving well the purpose for which the building is intended. It must be simple and sound from engineering and construction standpoints. It must be economical and come within budget limitations of the client. It must satisfy the personal likes and dislikes of the client. And, last but not least, it must be architecturally correct, a beautiful building." According to LBC&W, the philosophy of “Total Design” viewed man's environment holistically: the firm considered the buildings, neighborhoods, streets, parks, and additional facilities in the overall design of the structure.

The firm's Architecture, Engineering, and Planning departments coordinated efforts to devise the best design plan to respond to “the increasing complexities of modern living” that “have made it necessary to take a new approach toward achieving this age old goal.” Regarding architecture, what LBC&W heralded as “the guiding force of total design,” the firm paid close attention to the overall site of a project; its landscaping, exteriors, interiors, and furnishings. Engineering, meanwhile, was the science of total design that made the project feasible and produced “safe, serviceable, and practical structures and systems.” Planning, considered “the unifying force” of a project, “molds architectural and engineering ideas and creations into an orderly and efficient environmental pattern to meet the physical, social, and economic needs of man.” LBC&W also recognized the importance of forming an expert design team of electrical, mechanical, and structural engineers, as well as landscape architects, interior designers, and soil experts. A mandate was that these specialists have “a genuine appreciation of and basic understanding of one another’s problems – with a collective objective to produce excellence in an over-all solution rather than in its various components.”

== Style ==
=== Residential architecture ===
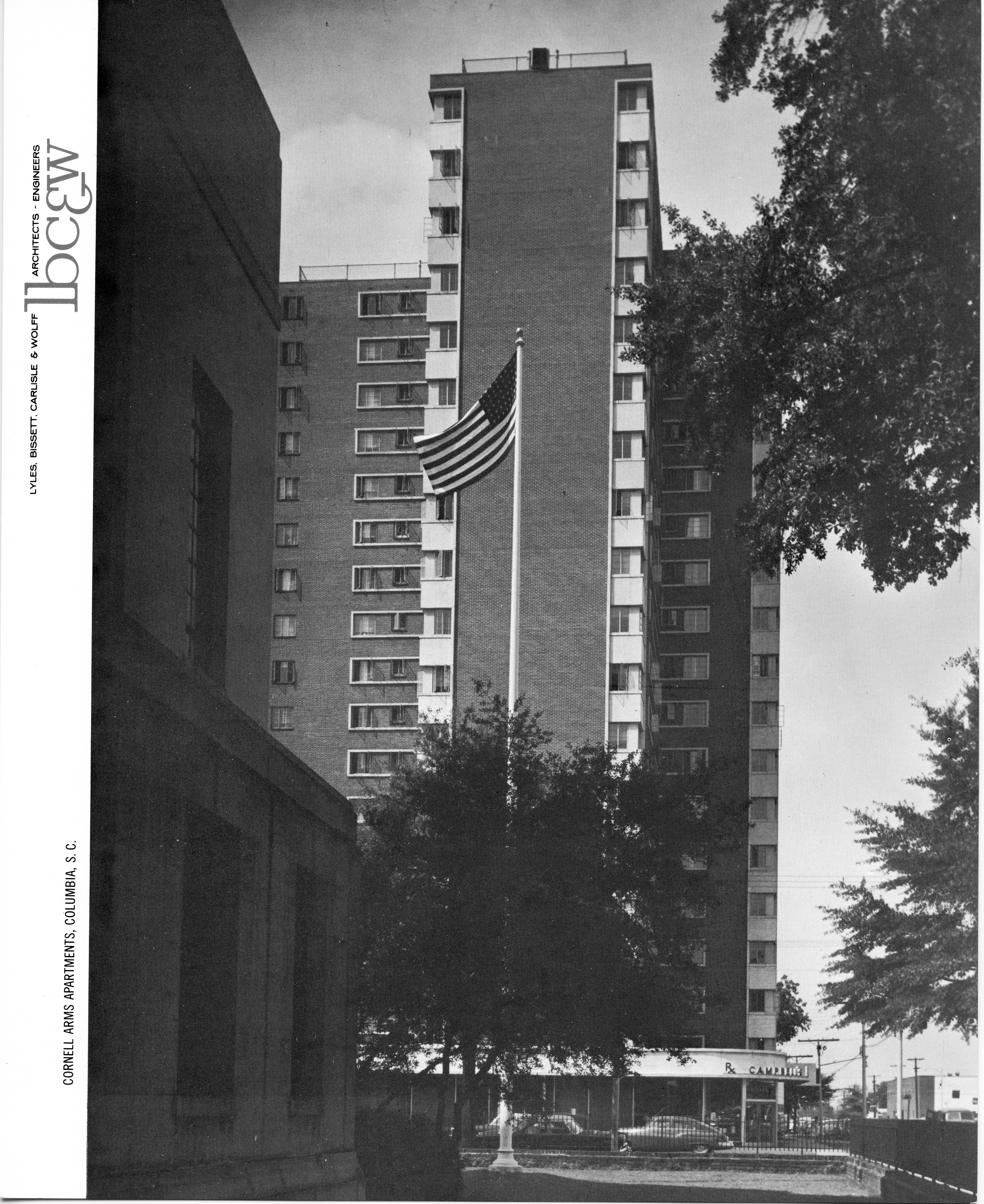
Cornell Arms, 1208 Pendleton Street

The post-war housing needs in the mid-twentieth century prompted standardization in residential design. Mass production, cost efficiency, and functional layouts were not only necessary for the production of high volumes of residential architecture, but were also tenets of modern design. Modern architects designing residential properties reflective of the International Style developed innovative concrete systems that adapted to normative construction processes. This allowed for mass prototypes that streamlined housing architecture in the midcentury. Pre-fabrication became a way for architects to design economical buildings that could help Americans purchase their own home and achieve the “American Dream.” Lyles, Bissett, Carlisle, and Wolff all designed their own homes and demonstrated how architects employed the use of the international style for residential architecture.

Modern architecture not only emphasized style, but introduced good style on a large scale. LBC&W published several design books dedicated to different designs of residential homes. For example, “Small Homes” promoted their designs as “economical, efficient, and simple to build,” without compromising “attractiveness, durability, and livability of the finished product.” While not usually considered explicit expressions of Modern architecture, these other residential homes incorporated modern materials and overall design iterations from the modern movement and helped foster modern architecture for the masses. LBC&W did not design every residential building in the International Style. James F. Byrnes, who was a notable politician and statesman, commissioned his residence to be done in the Colonial Revival style.

LBC&W incorporated the Modernist movement ideas of urban planning into its work. A big concern with Modern architecture was thinking about how good design and planning could solve social problems. Several early Modernists looked for new ways to eliminate the congestion of cities, which many believed created unhealthy environments and social problems. The use of space was then reimagined to think about how people can interact differently with a city. Le Corbusier’s Towers in the Park was one of the ideas intended to cure social problems through designing planned landscapes. Le Corbusier's idea was that high-rise buildings could mitigate the effects of overcrowding and urban pollution. LBC&W integrated this theory into their work early in the firm's history when they designed Cornell Arms in 1949, a nineteen-story apartment building located in the heart of Columbia. Funded by the FHA and intended to cater to Columbia's post-war population boom, LBC&W built a cruciform high-rise tower to house hundreds of people in a crowded downtown.

=== University architecture ===
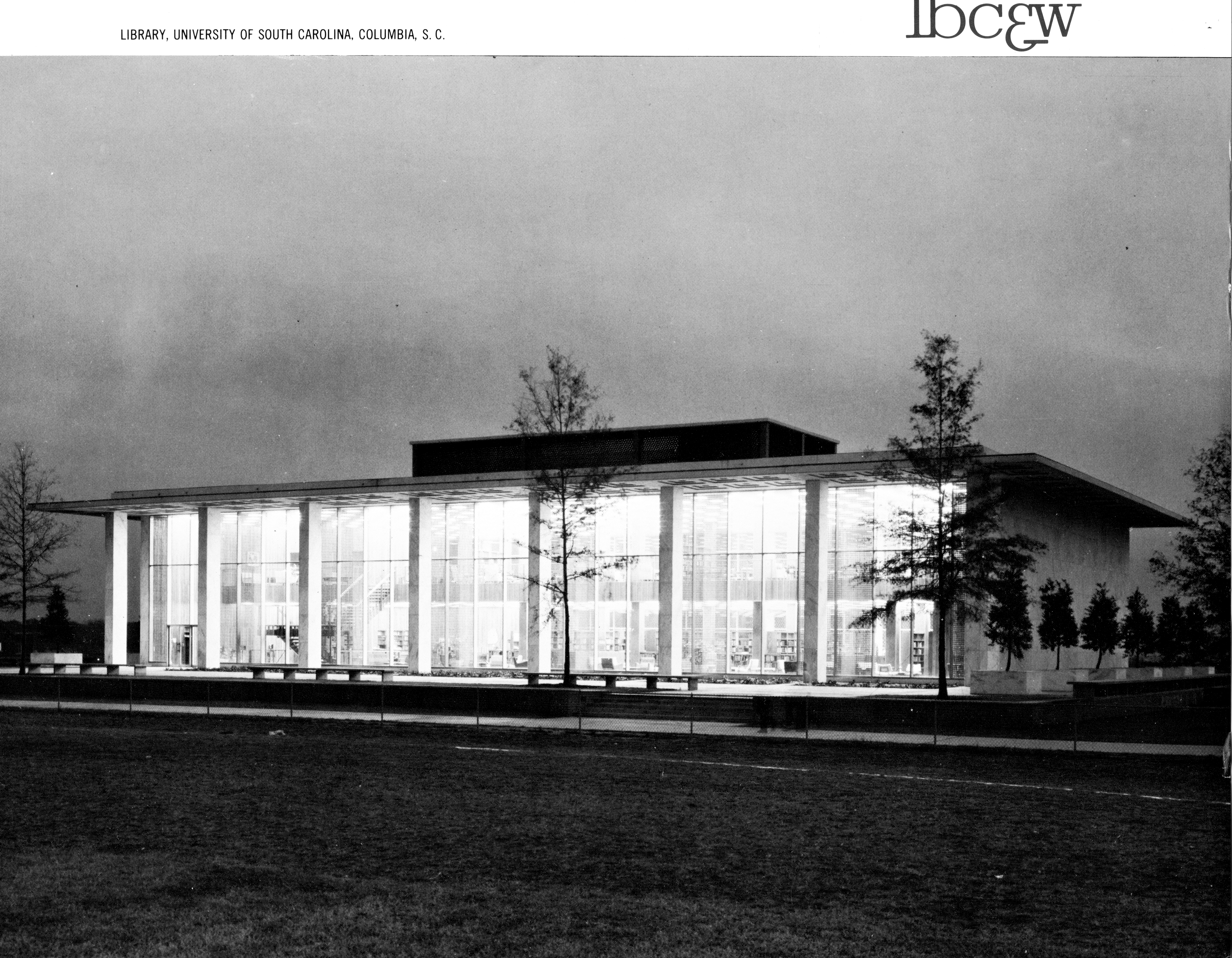
Thomas Cooper Library USC

LBC&W constructed buildings for colleges throughout the South, including libraries, student unions, dorms, and classroom buildings. Among their more significant works, the firm designed the Carolina Coliseum, 1968–1969, for the University of South Carolina. Built both to serve the academic needs of the student body and to house the university's basketball program, the Coliseum was an instrumental part of the university's expansion in the mid-sixties. William Lyles was active in Columbia's urban renewal policies and practices, and the Coliseum was a beacon of this social and economic force, as designed by LBC&W. Along with the Coliseum, the firm also constructed other buildings on the campus of the University of South Carolina. These buildings include the Russell House student union, constructed in 1955, the Engineering Laboratory (Sumwalt) in 1951–52, the Humanities Complex/Center in 1968, the President House in 1953, South Building in 1962, Tower Dormitory and Thomas Cooper Undergraduate Library in 1959, and a women's residence hall in 1962.

LBC&W also constructed buildings for other universities in the Columbia area, including Allen College, Benedict College, Columbia College, Lutheran Theological Seminary, and Fort Jackson. At Allen College, LBC&W constructed the library in 1971 on Hampton Street. At Benedict College, the firm constructed the Benjamin F. Payton Learning Resources Center in 1971–73, the Human Resources Center, the library, and Mather Hall. At Columbia College, the firm constructed Asbury Hall in 1965 on Russell Ave and the Women's Dormitory. LBC&W constructed four buildings for the Lutheran Theological Seminary, including the President's Home in 1962, Student Apartments in 1960, the Student Union in 1961, and Yost Administration Building in 1960.

=== Government buildings ===
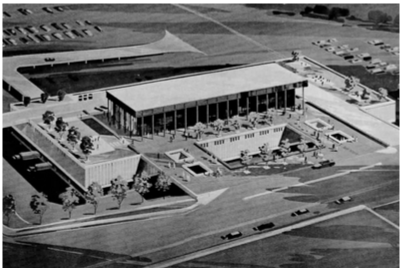
Columbia SC Post Office, LBC&W

The firm's practice of modern planning corresponded with the goals of local governments that wanted to improve city environments. LBC&Ws use of “Total Design” in the construction of South Carolina’s State Capitol Complex, for example, highlighted how the firm stressed attention to the total environment of a project and attempted to improve the neighborhood. Similar to the way LBC&W approached Cornell Arms, this was another response to the conversation on the complexities of modern living. The plan for the State Capitol Complex embodied the comprehensive approach of LBC&W’s “Total Design” philosophy as it emphasized architectural cohesion, landscaping, parking and traffic, and necessary functional elements to ensure that the complex suited the state government’s needs.

The Capitol Complex is by far the most recognizable LBC&W government project in Columbia, but other commissions in the city include the Harden Street Fire Station and the U.S. Post Office. The goal of LBC&W's comprehensive planning approach was to introduce order and regularity to the sites. The Capitol Complex specifically was meant to serve as an example for how the rest of the downtown could be formed, with pedestrian pathways and easy parking. Columbia relied on LBC&W to pave the way for the city to enter the 21st century.

== Completed projects (partial) ==
Name of Project	Location	Name of Client	Year of Work Completion	Estimated Cost
Cornell Arms Apartments	Columbia, South Carolina	Cornell G. Fuller	1949	$1,500,000
Darlington Apartments	Charleston, South Carolina	Leonard D. Long	1950	$1,626,000
Sergeant Jasper Apartments	Charleston, South Carolina	J. C. Long	1950	$2,500,000
Clemson House Hotel (Demolished in 2017)	Clemson, South Carolina	Clemson University	1950	
The Darlington	Atlanta, Georgia		1951	$5,250,000
James F. Byrnes Residence	Columbia, South Carolina	James F. Byrnes	1955	
Russell House Student Union	Columbia, South Carolina	University of South Carolina	1955	
Columbia Country Club	Columbia, South Carolina		1962	
Abbeville County Courthouse Renovation	Abbeville, South Carolina	Abbeville County, South Carolina	1964	
Ashley House (Charleston, South Carolina)	Charleston, South Carolina	M. B. Kahn Construction Company	1966	$2,000,000
Seneca High School	Seneca, South Carolina	Oconee County School District	1967	$1,150,000
Richland Memorial Hospital	Columbia, South Carolina	Richland County Hospital	1967	$25,000,000
Belk Hall	Due West, SC	Erskine College	1967	
1601 Assembly Street Post Office	Columbia, South Carolina		1968	
Carolina Coliseum	Columbia, South Carolina	University of South Carolina	1969	$10,000,000
Federal City College	Washington, D.C.	District of Columbia	1972	$954,000
General Electric Plant	Mebane, North Carolina	General Electric Company	1972	$400,000
Moncrief Army Community Hospital	Fort Jackson (South Carolina)	Savannah District, U.S. Army Corps of Engineers	1972	$10,800,000
Pepsi-Cola Bottling Plant	Columbia, South Carolina	Pepsi-Cola Company	1973	$2,000,000
Edgar A. Brown Building	Columbia, South Carolina	Government of South Carolina	1973	$3,000,000
Gulf Reston International Center	Reston, Virginia	Gulf Reston Inc., Sheraton Hotels and Resorts	1973	$10,000,000
Bankers Trust Tower	Columbia, South Carolina		1974	

== Gallery ==
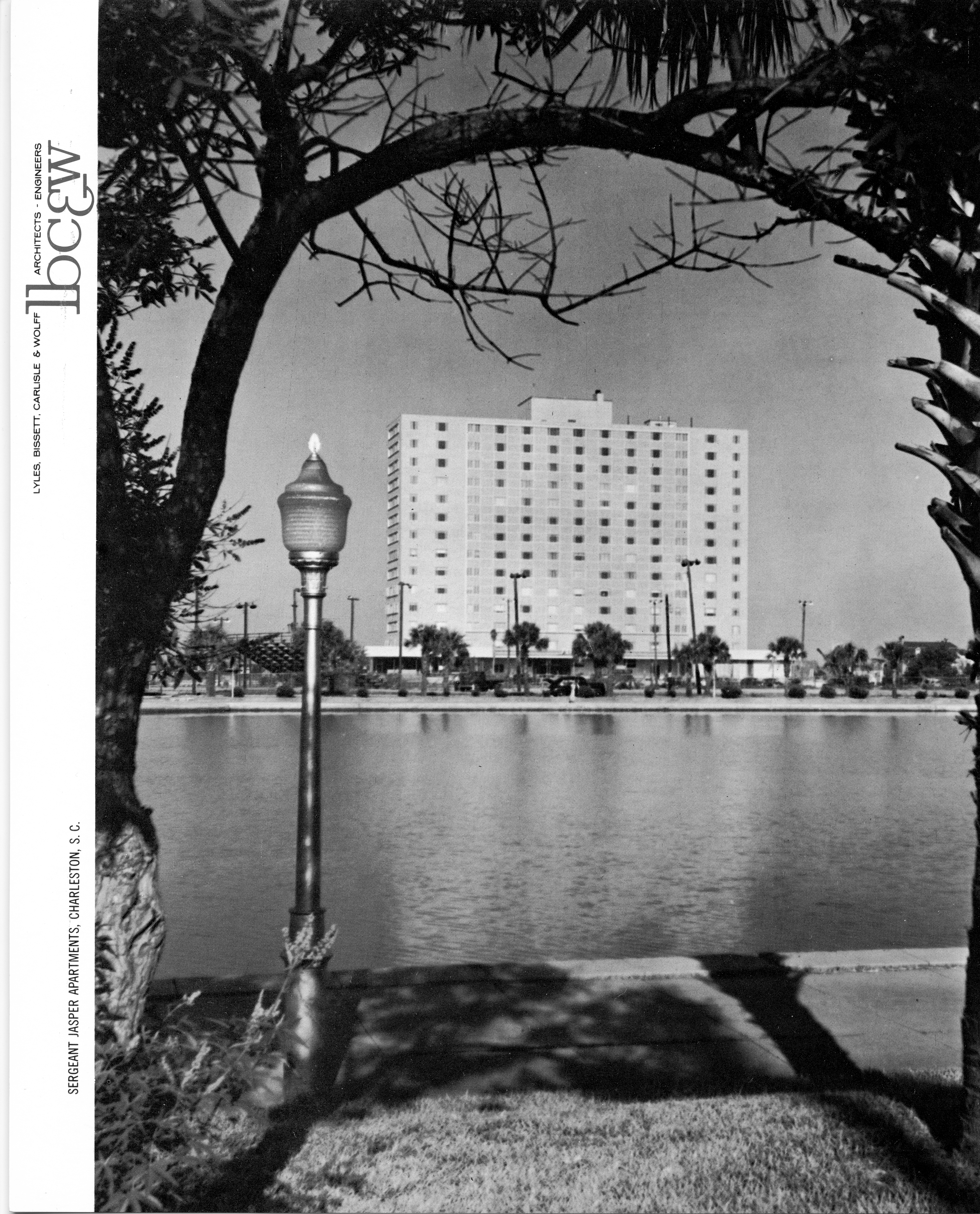
Sergeant Jasper Apartments located on Broad Street in Charleston, SC and constructed in 1949, these apartments have now been demolished.

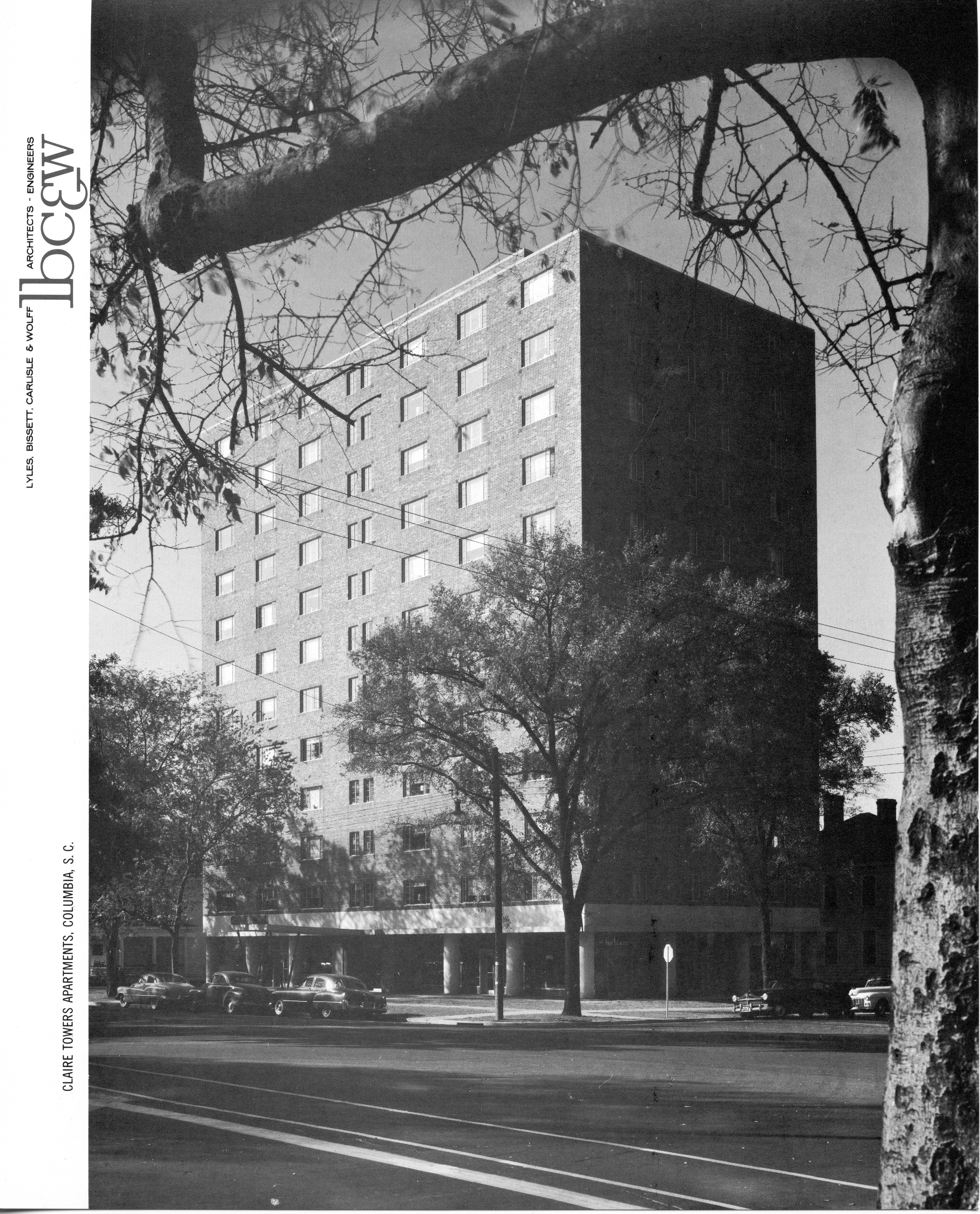
Claire Towers, constructed in 1950 for veterans in Columbia, SC.

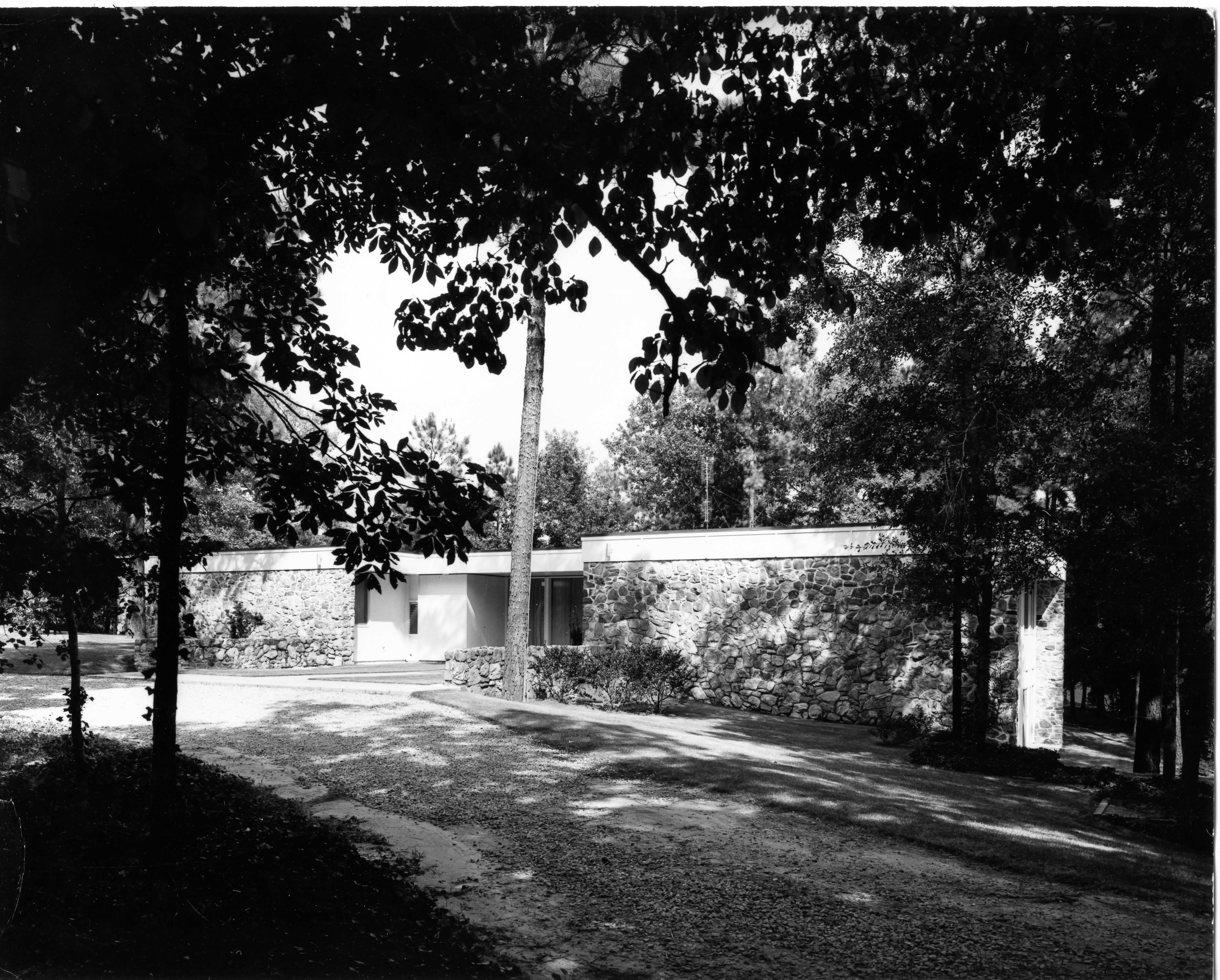
Wolff house designed by Mr. Wolff for his family. Constructed between 1960 and 1963 in a Columbia, SC neighborhood.

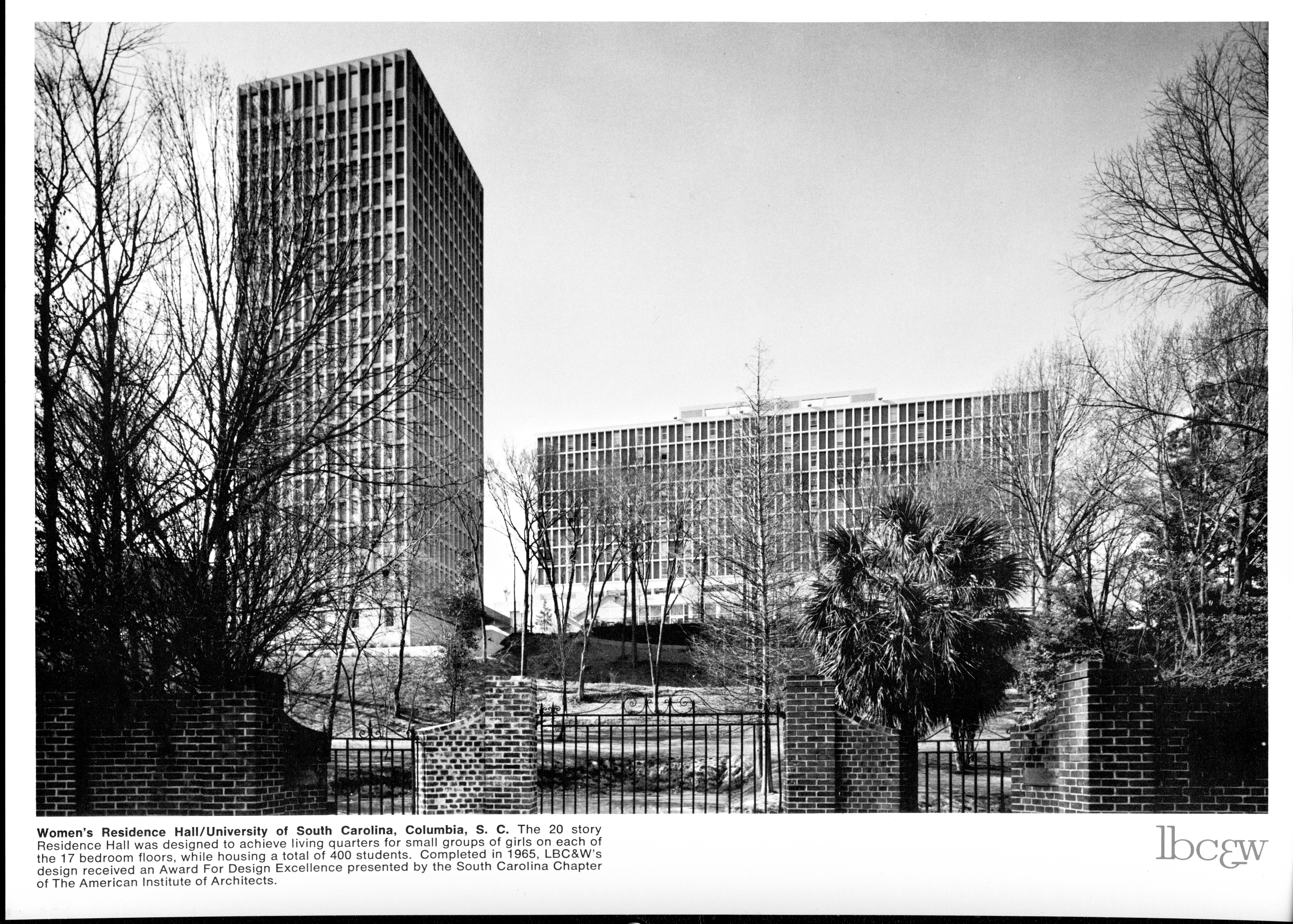
The Women's Residence Hall built for USC in 1965, it is now called South Tower and serves as a co-ed dorm.
