= 101 North Main Street (Greenville, South Carolina) =

Skyscraper in Greenville, South Carolina

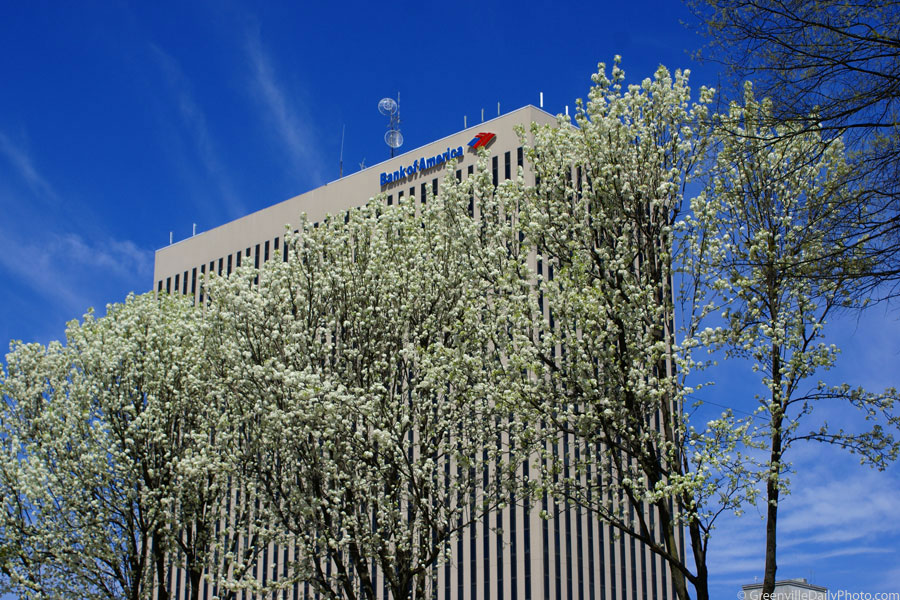
- Bank of America (47951401817) 101 North Main Street in 2019

- Location within South Carolina 101 North Main Street (Greenville, South Carolina) (the United States)

General information
- Status: Completed
- Architectural style: International
- Location: 101 North Main Street, Greenville, South Carolina, United States
- Coordinates: 34°51′07″N 82°23′59″W
- Completed: 1974

Height
- Roof: 240 ft (73 m)

Technical details
- Floor count: 16

101 North Main Street (formerly known as Bank of America Plaza or Bank of America Building) is a 240 ft (73 m) tall international style office building located on 101 North Main Street in downtown Greenville, South Carolina. The building has 16 floors and was built in 1974. At the time of its completion, it became the 2nd-tallest building in Greenville. As of February 2026, it is the 3rd-tallest building in Greenville.

In 2015, it was announced that the 3rd floor of the building would be transformed into a tech hub called "NEXT on Main".

In 2016, RealOp Investments bought the building from the Hughes Development Corporation for $22.5 million dollars. After the building's purchase, it would undergo a series of renovations. Renovations included modernizing the building's lobby, due to it being the first thing the public would see when they would walk into the building, the renovations also included renovating the bathrooms, and modernizing the building's facade.

In 2021, Canal Insurance announced that they will move their headquarters from 400 East Stone Avenue to 101 North Main Street. Canal Insurance also gained the signage rights for the building.

The building is a part of One City Plaza. Amenities include a cafe, a fitness center, and a courtyard.

== See also ==
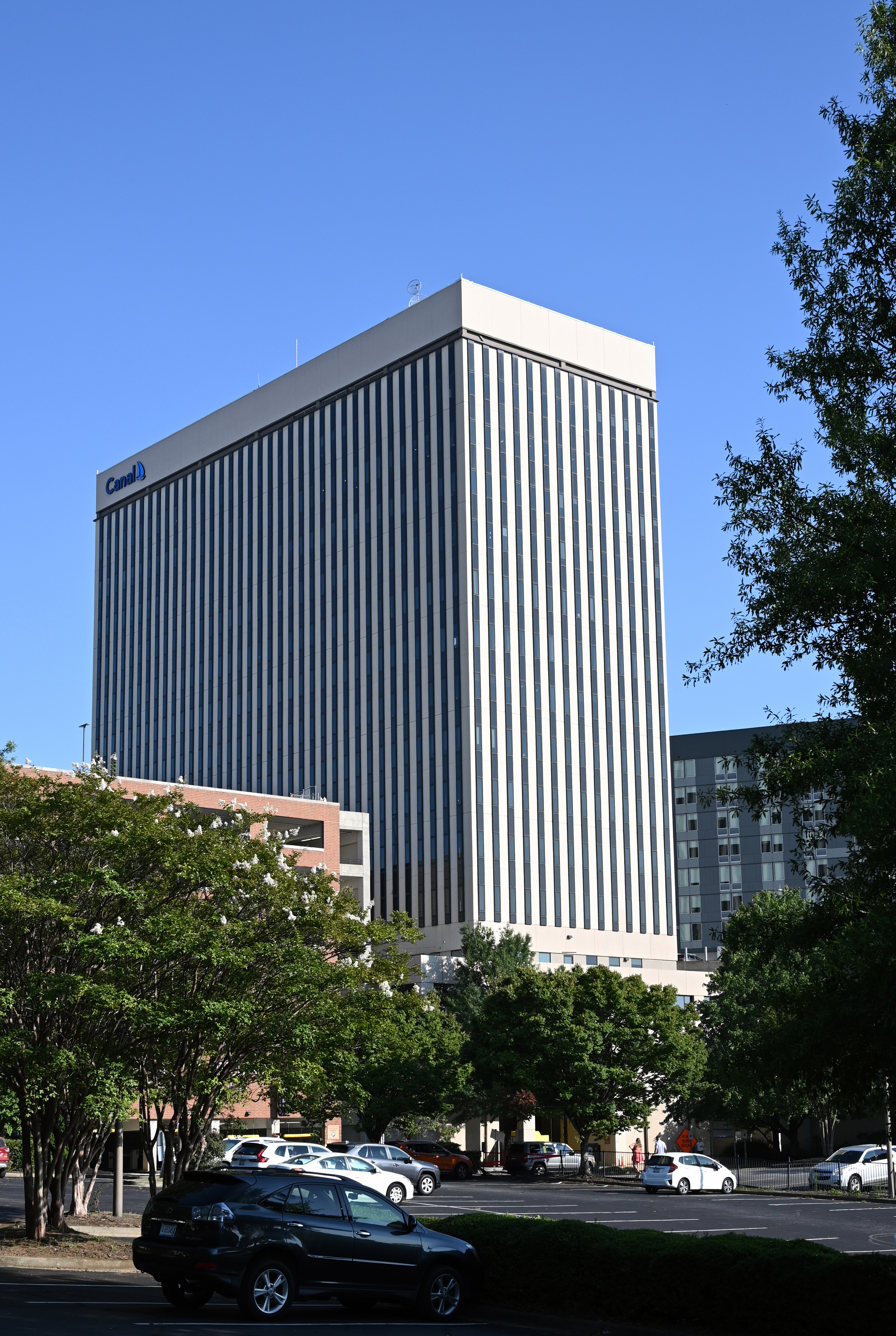
101 North Main Street after the renovations with the new Canal Insurance Signage.

- List of tallest buildings in South Carolina
- Poinsett Plaza
- Landmark Building (Greenville, South Carolina)
