= Joseph Floyd Manor =

Coordinates: 32.812849°N 79.951890°W

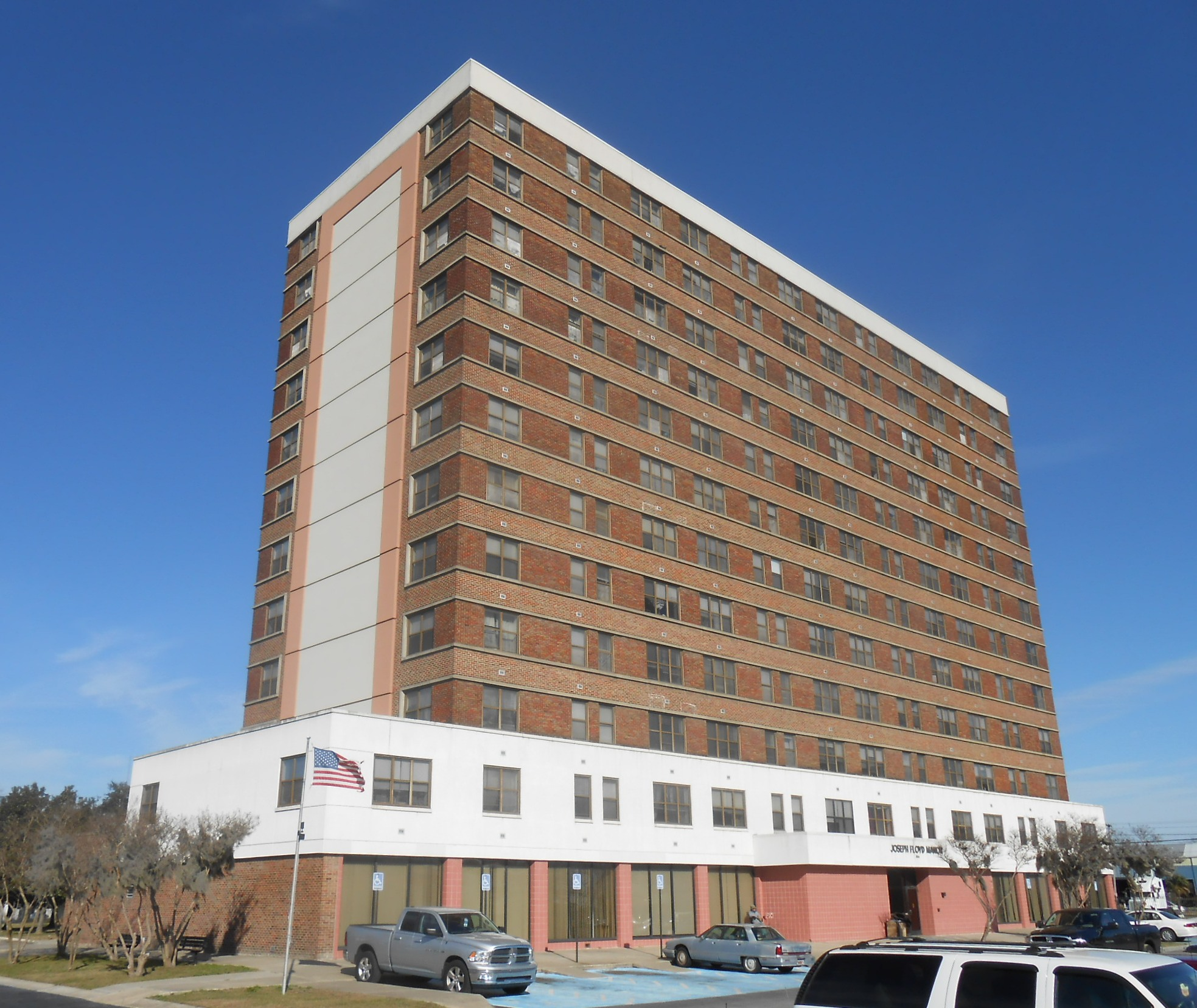
The former Darlington Apartments are now used for senior citizen residences.

The Joseph Floyd Manor is a public housing facility designated for elderly and disabled citizens. It is in the upper peninsula area of Charleston, South Carolina. The building is located at 2106 Mt. Pleasant Street, on the northwest corner of Mt. Pleasant St. and King St. The 12-story building was originally known as the Darlington Apartments and was designed by William G. Lyles, Bissett, Carlisle & Wolff of Columbia, South Carolina. The facility has 156 single occupancy rooms.

== History ==
The apartments cost $1,626,000 when it was built, starting in 1950. The ground floor was supposed to have space for commercial spaces, and the second floor was to have professional offices such as lawyers or doctors along with 156 apartments. Rent for an apartment ranged from $75 per month for a one-bedroom efficiency to $175 a month for one of three three-bedroom penthouse apartments. The property had been bought by Mr. Leonard D. Long in 1933 when it housed a tent community and there were only two nearby houses. Immediately before the construction began in January 1950, the site was home to a World War II-era nightclub known as the Windmill which was being used as a grocery store. The apartments were meant to cater to single men and women and retirees.

In 1979, the Charleston County Housing and Redevelopment Authority tried to rework the building into apartments for the elderly with the assistance of $2.5 million from the Department of Housing and Urban Development. The lowest bid received for the work, however, was $3.6 million. At the time, the chairman of the Authority was Joseph H. Floyd.

The work was eventually carried out, and the newly christened Joseph Floyd Manor reopened in March 1981 following a renovation. After the work, the first floor included a mix of uses; the second floor was for handicapped residents; and the upper floors were for the elderly. The building, named for chairman of the Authority board, reopened in March 1981.

In May 2020, conditions of the building came under question by residents and local state officials. After a tour of the facilities, South Carolina state house representative Wendell Gilliard wrote to Congressman Jim Clyburn that the conditions at Joseph Floyd Manor were "most definitely subhuman and deplorable." A meeting to discuss repair costs will be held for the Charleston County Council by the manor's housing board. Charleston County Council does not have direct oversight of the housing project, but Charleston County does name the commissioners of the Housing and Redevelopment Authority; on June 17, 2020, Charleston County Council removed George Dawson as a member of the Housing and Redevelopment Authority.
