= Tower at 1301 Gervais =

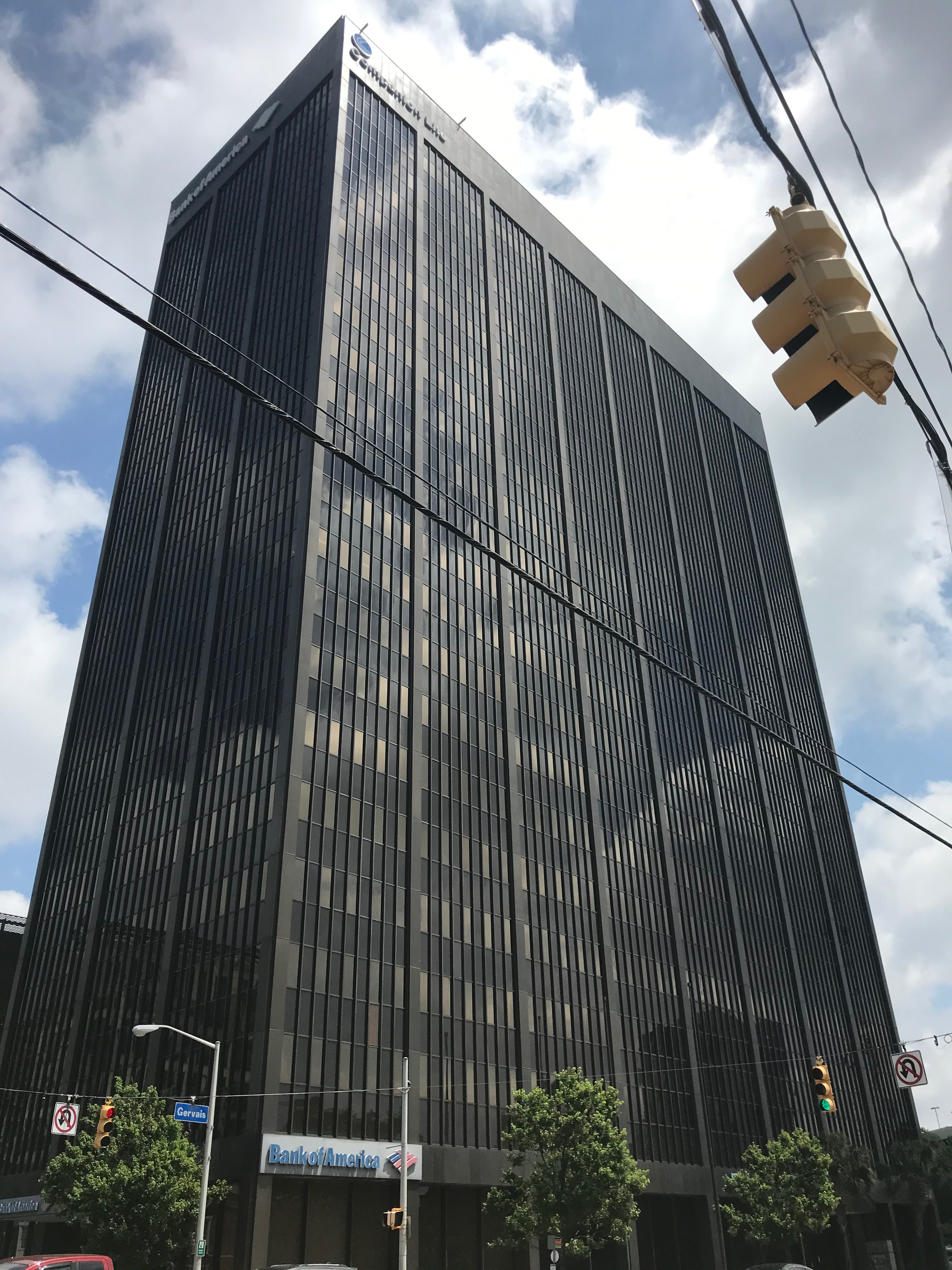
- Interactive map of the Tower at 1301 Gervais area

General information
- Status: Completed
- Type: Office
- Location: Gervais and Sumter streets, Columbia, South Carolina
- Coordinates: 34.0021°N 81.0315°W
- Completed: 1973

Height
- Roof: 278 ft (85 m)

Technical details
- Floor count: 20

Design and construction
- Architects: Lyles, Bissett, Carlisle, and Wolff (LBC&W)

Tower at 1301 Gervais is a high-rise office building in Columbia, South Carolina, and the tallest building in the city not located along the Main Street corridor. Built in 1973, the tower has dark glazing with anodized aluminum columns to give it a dark, uniformly colored appearance. The top floor of the tower holds a private club with views of the city. It was originally constructed for Bankers Trust as their headquarters. It was the tallest building in the city at its completion until the Palmetto Center was topped out on January 23, 1983.

== See also ==
- John Henry Devereux
- 101 North Main Street (Greenville, South Carolina)
- St. Matthew's German Evangelical Lutheran Church
- List of tallest buildings in Columbia, South Carolina
