= Cornell Arms Apartments =

Apartment skyscraper in Columbia, South Carolina

- U.S. National Register of Historic Places
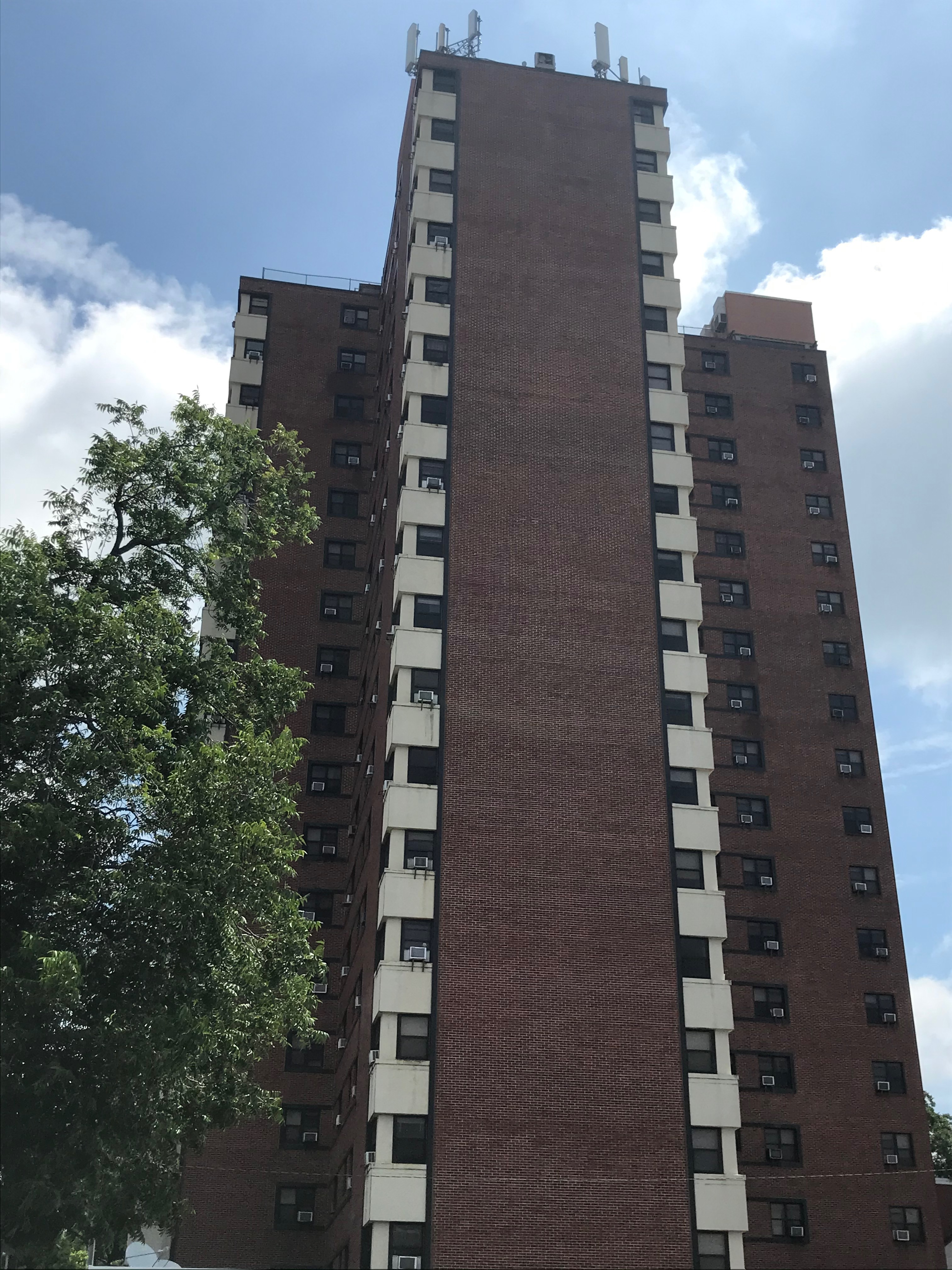

- Location within South Carolina Location within the United States
- Location: 1230 Pendleton St., Columbia, South Carolina
- Coordinates: 33°59′55″N 81°01′52″W
- Area: 0.4 acres (0.16 ha)
- Built: 1948-1949
- Architect: Lyles, Bissett, Carlisle, and Wolff
- Architectural style: International Style
- NRHP reference No.: 100003305
- Added to NRHP: January 11, 2019

Cornell Arms Apartments, built in 1949, is a high-rise in Columbia, South Carolina. It was designed by architecture firm Lyles, Bissett, Carlisle, and Wolff. It was often advertised as "the tallest building between Richmond and Miami".

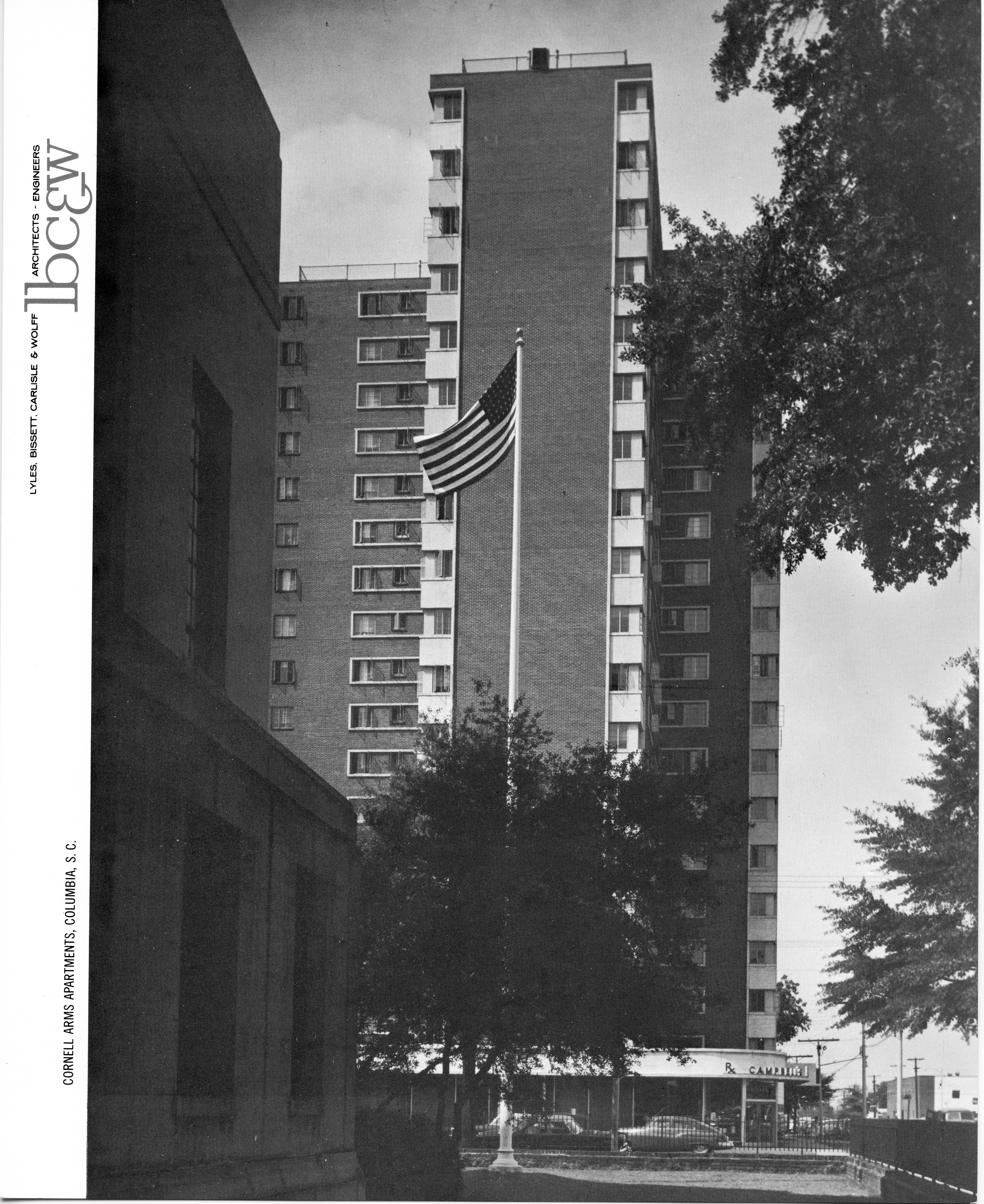
Cornell Arms in 1950

Cornell Arms Apartments was listed on the National Register of Historic Places in 2019. It was listed for its significance in the architectural response to the post-World War II housing shortage and a need for higher-density residences. The building express Lyles, Bissett, Carlisle, and Wolff's early modern architecture philosophy and earned them a lucrative relationship with the United States government.

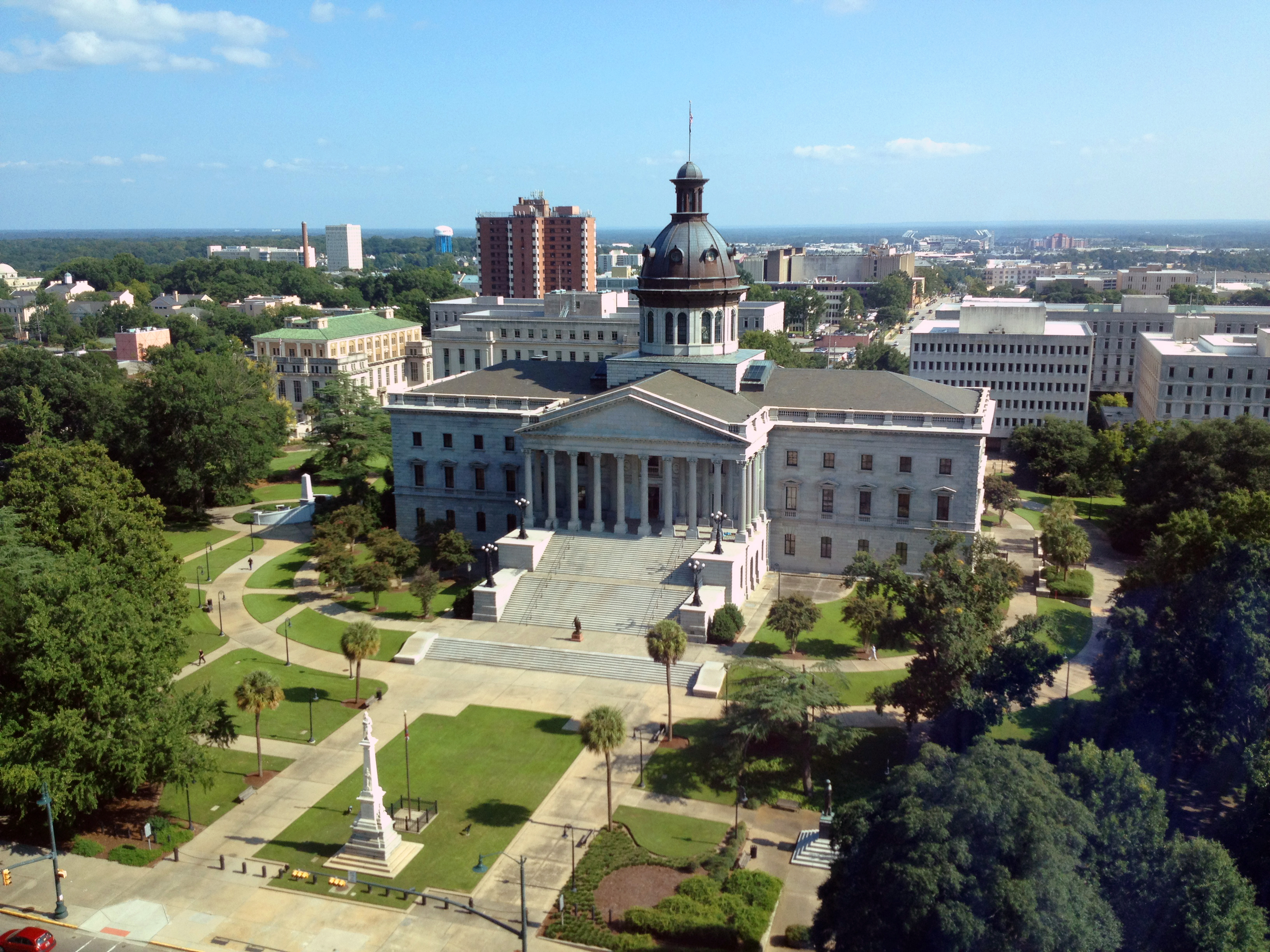
South Carolina State House with Cornell Arms behind it

It stands at 210 ft (64 m) and has 18 floors. Construction began in 1948 and was completed in 1949. The building was built with a steel frame structure.

== See also ==
- List of tallest buildings in Columbia, South Carolina
