= Landmark Building (Greenville, South Carolina) =

Office skyscraper in Greenville, South Carolina

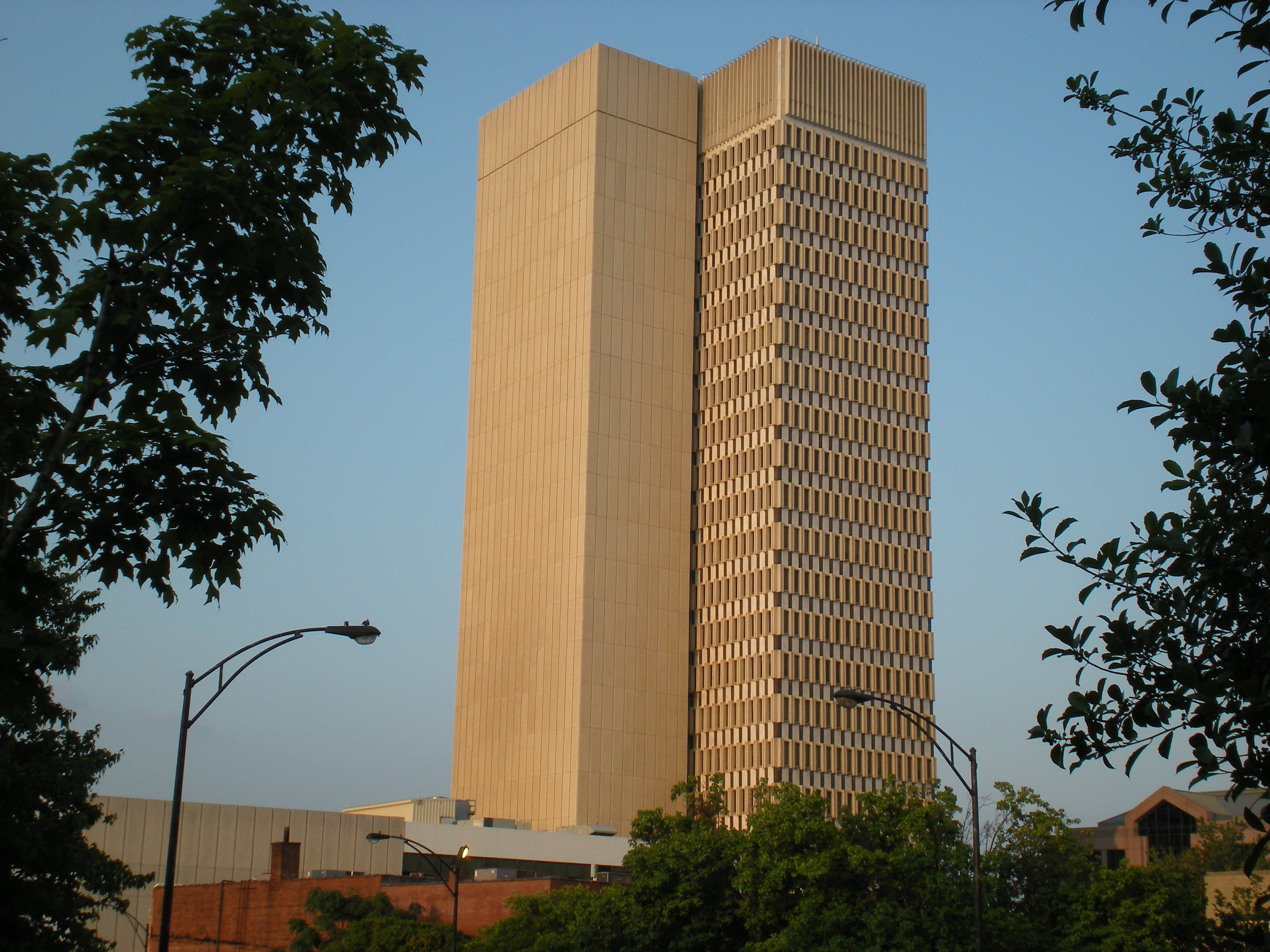
- Landmark Building in 2009
- Interactive map of the Landmark Building area
- Alternative names: Daniel Building; BB&T Building; Windstream Building; Landmark Tower

General information
- Status: Completed
- Type: Commercial offices
- Architectural style: Mid-century modern / brutalist
- Location: 301 North Main St., Greenville, South Carolina
- Coordinates: 34°51′16″N 82°23′51″W
- Named for: Charles E. Daniel
- Construction started: June 29, 1964
- Completed: October 1966
- Opening: July 1, 1967
- Cost: $8 million

Height
- Roof: 305 ft (93 m)

Technical details
- Material: White Georgia marble, precast concrete
- Floor count: 25
- Floor area: 330,000 sq ft (31,000 m^{2})

Design and construction
- Architects: Stevens & Wilkinson

Other information
- Parking: 700 cars

The Landmark Building, also known as the Daniel Building, is an office skyscraper in Downtown Greenville, South Carolina, United States. At 305 ft (93 m), it was the tallest building in South Carolina from 1966 to 1983. With 25 stories, the skyscraper has been the tallest structure in Greenville since its completion in 1966. It was conceived by Charles E. Daniel, a United States senator who was known for his love of construction.

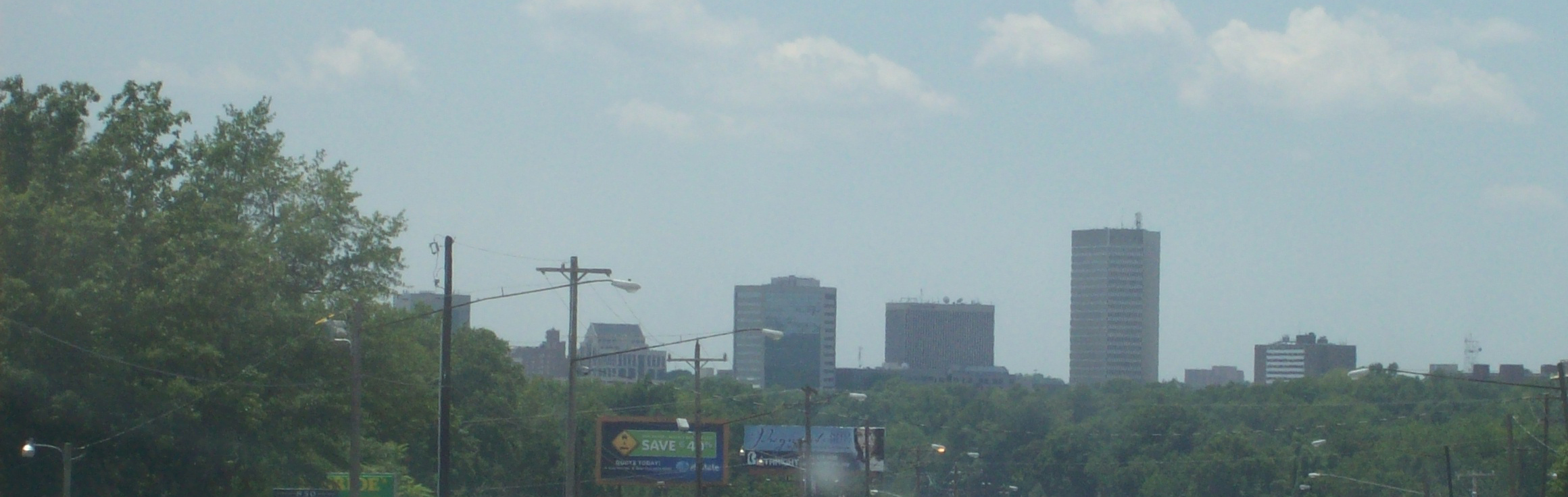
A skyline of Greenville with the Landmark Building prominently in the background

== History ==
Conceived in 1964, the project had a cost of $8 million and was designed by architecture firm Stevens & Wilkinson. Once completed, it would become the tallest building in Greenville and South Carolina. Groundbreaking took place on June 29, 1964. It was named the Daniel Building after its main supporter, Charles E. Daniel. Daniel employed his own construction company, Daniel International Corporation, to build the structure. He never lived to see its completion and died only two and a half months later. It was completed in 1966 and opened on July 1, 1967. Daniel International Corporation had their headquarters in the building and Charles E. Daniel is buried across the street in Springwood Cemetery. It still remains the tallest building in Greenville at 305 feet. A six-story parking garage is connected to the ground floor. It was renamed the Landmark Building in 1999. In January 2024, it was announced that the building would be rebranding to once again use the original Daniel Building name. Along with the renaming, a $4 million plaza and parking deck renovation project was introduced to make the building more modern and up to date for pedestrians as well as to attract tenants.

In 2025, construction began on a high-rise known as the Gateway Project and sits on the old site of the Greenville Memorial Auditorium, a lot that has sat vacant since its demolition in 1997. This structure is set to surpass the Landmark Building to become the tallest building in Greenville and South Carolina as a whole at a height of 29 stories.

== Gallery ==
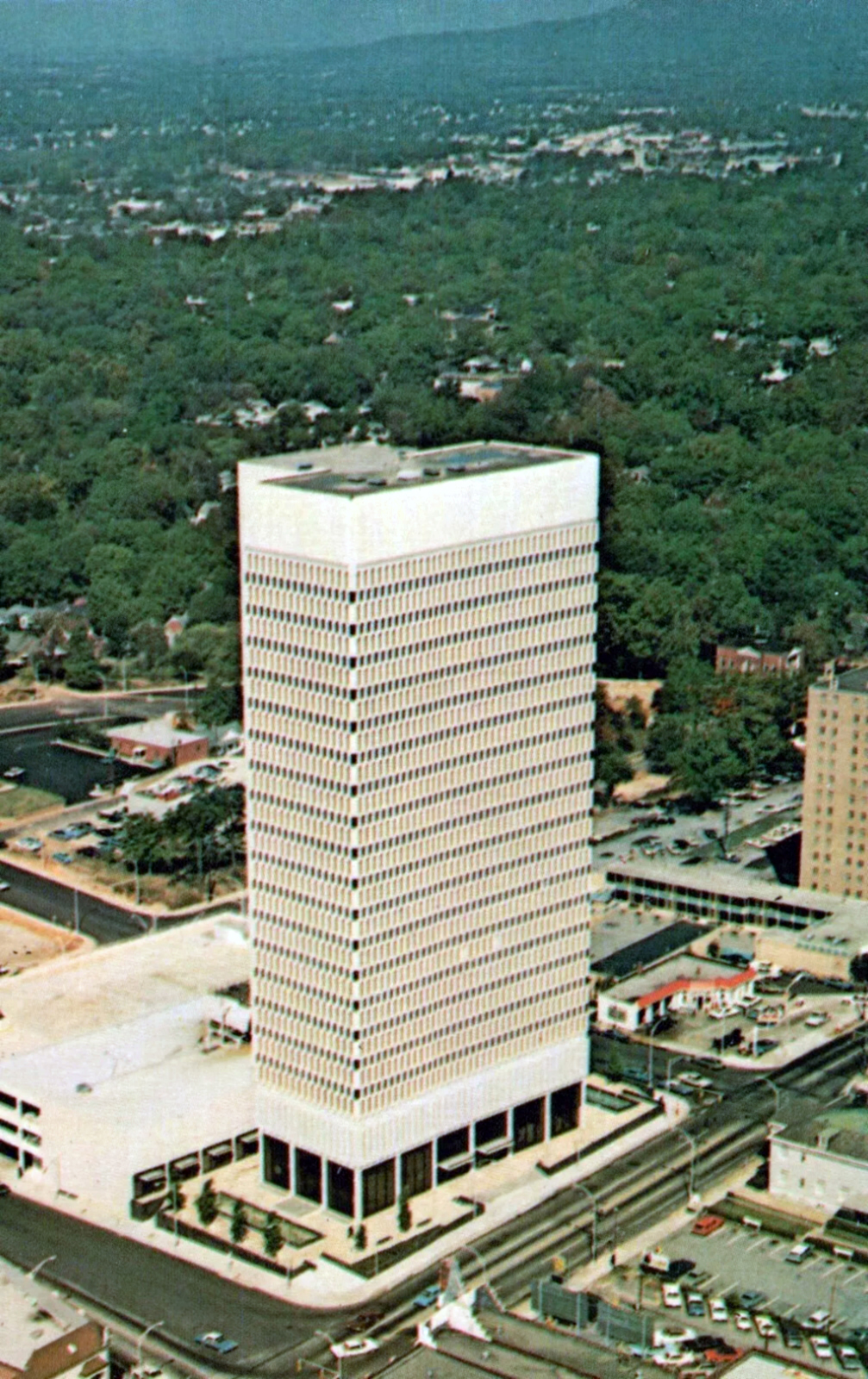
The Daniel Building shortly after completion in 1967

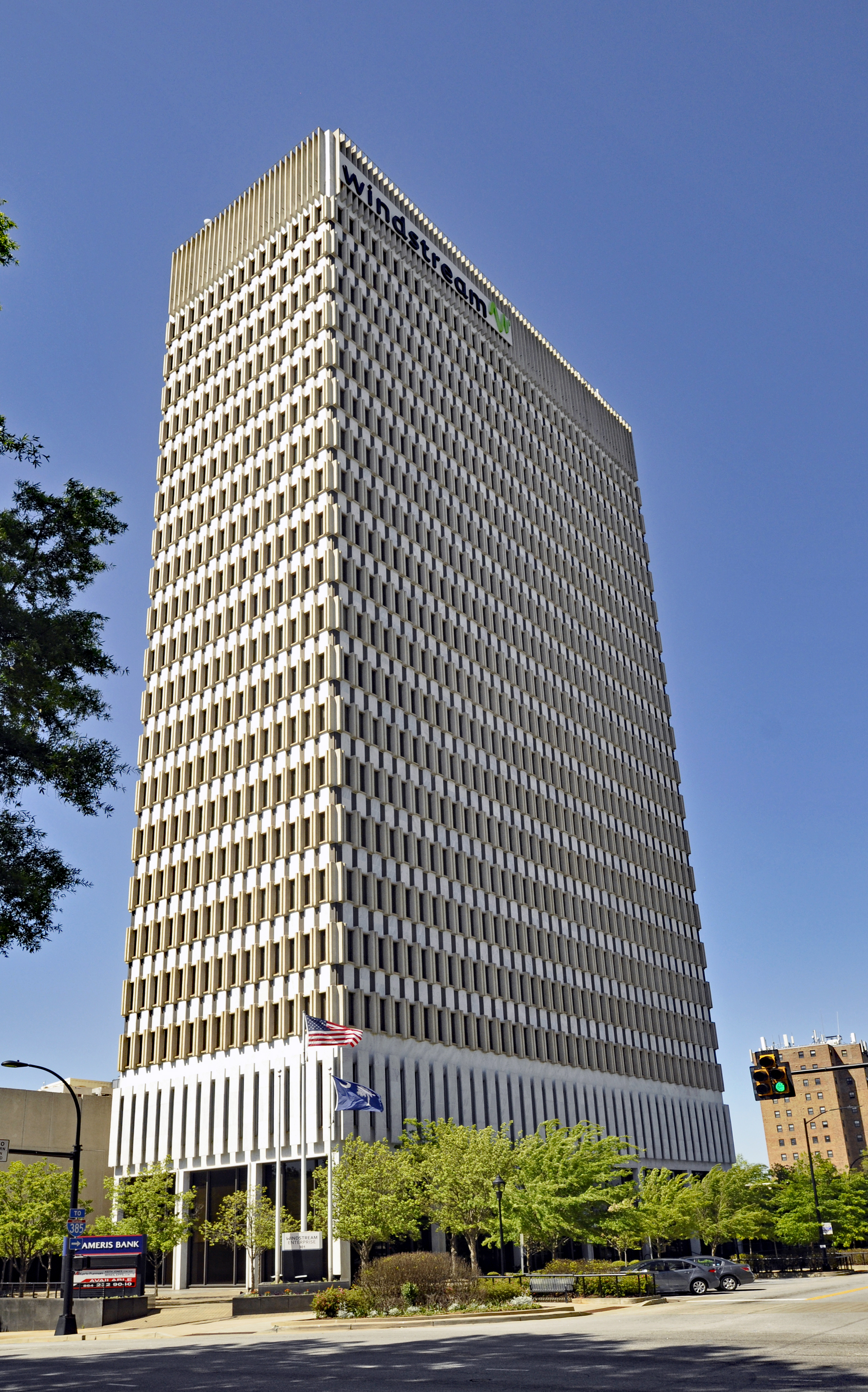
The building in 2023

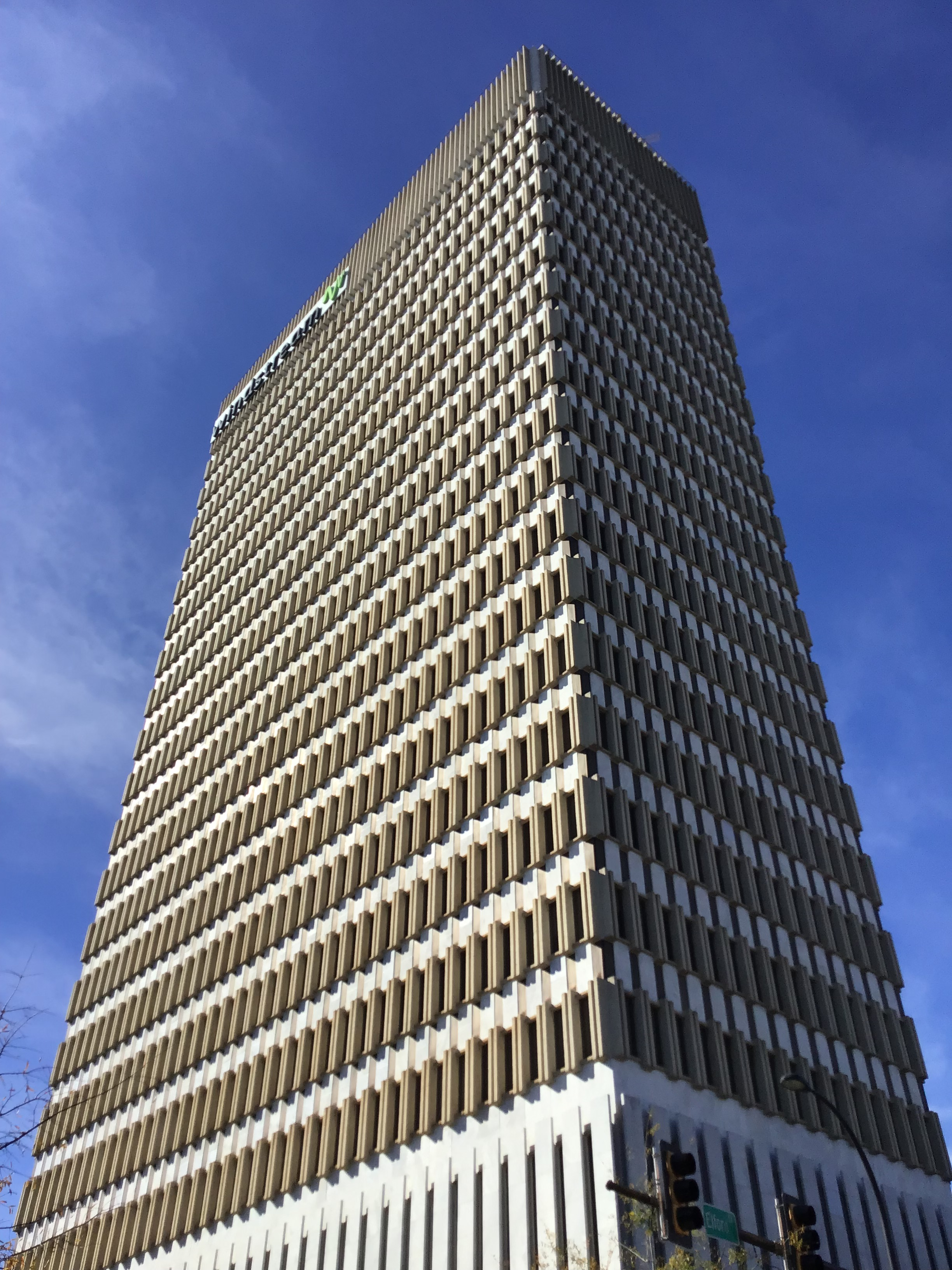
View from the side corner

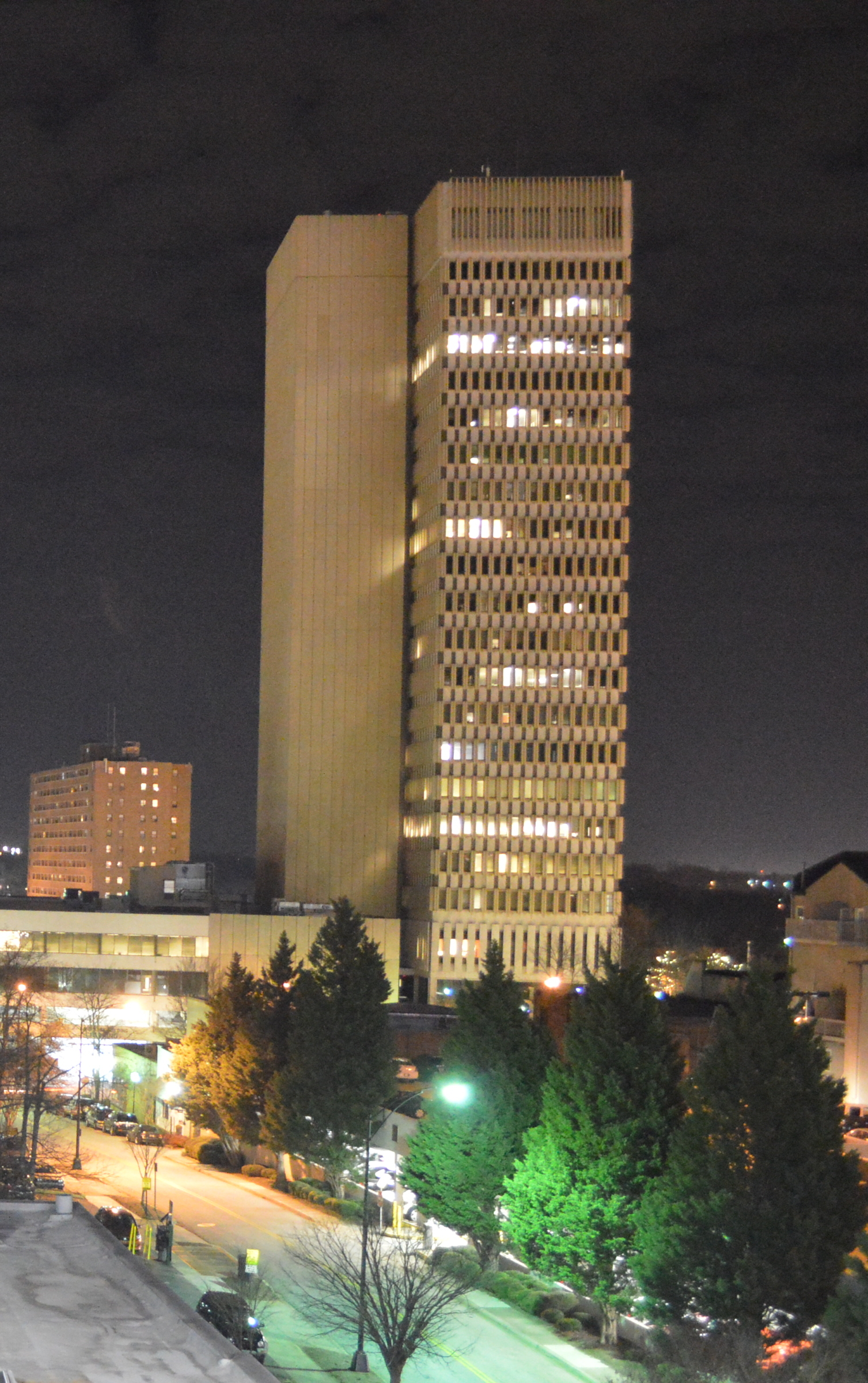
Landmark Building at night

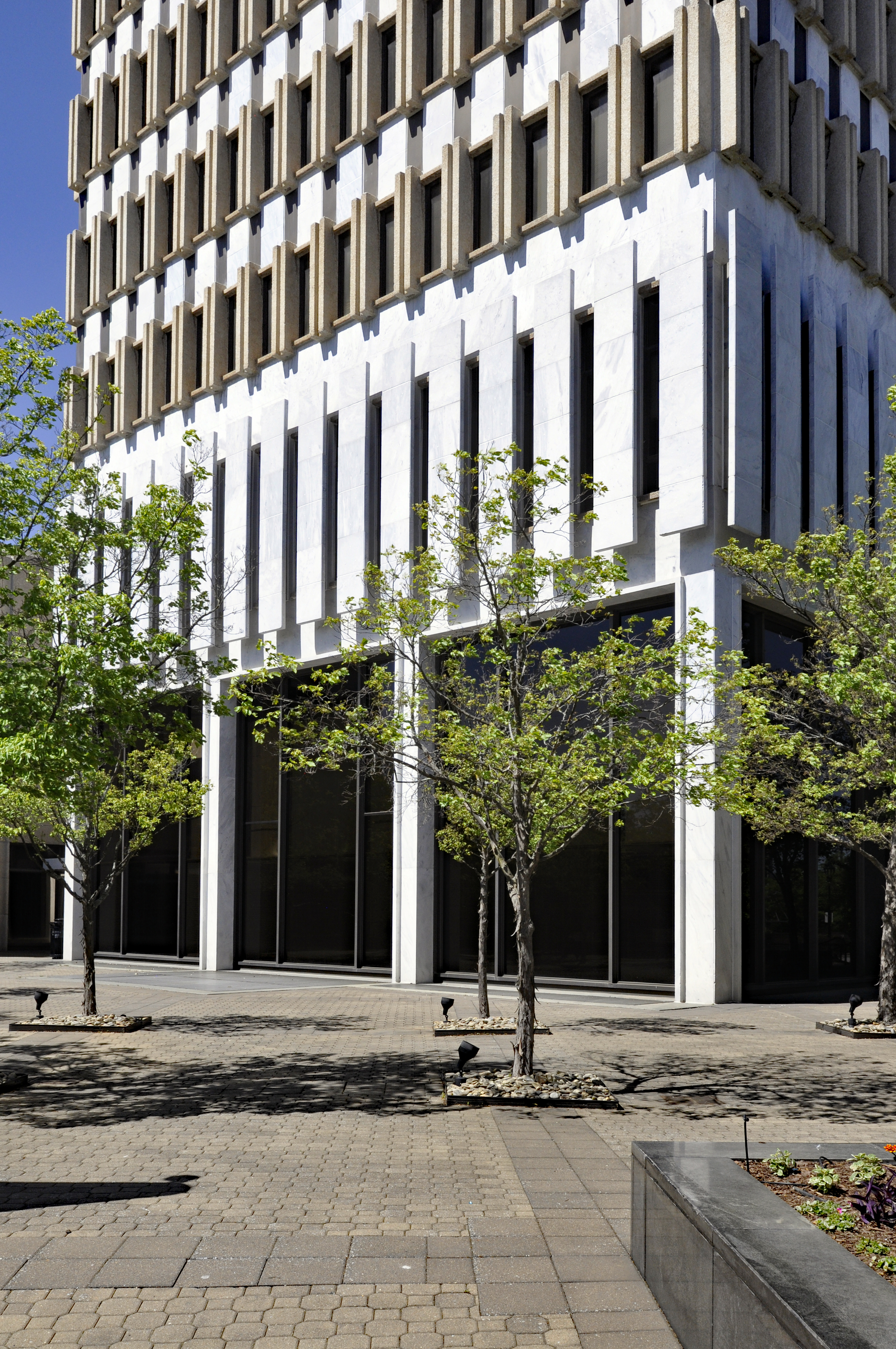
Plaza after recently completed renovations

== See also ==
- List of tallest buildings in South Carolina
- Poinsett Plaza
- 101 North Main Street (Greenville, South Carolina)
