= Poinsett Plaza =

Skyscraper in Greenville, South Carolina

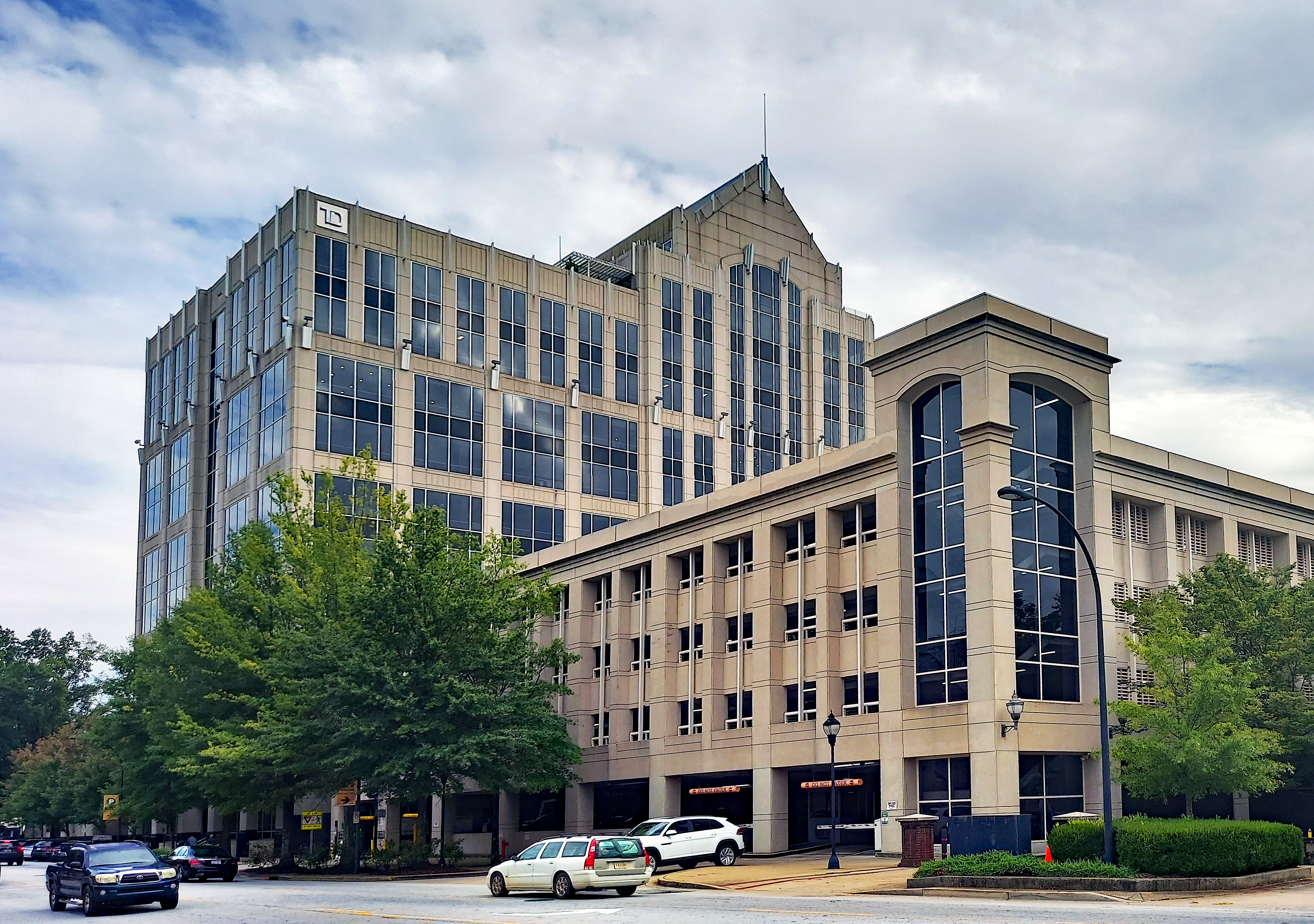
- Poinsett Plaza, Greenville, South Carolina Poinsett Plaza in 2019

- Location within South Carolina Poinsett Plaza (the United States)

General information
- Status: Completed
- Architectural style: Postmodern
- Location: 104 South Main Street, Greenville, South Carolina, United States
- Coordinates: 34°50′58″N 82°24′01″W
- Completed: 1999

Height
- Tip: 230 ft (70 m)
- Roof: 190 ft (58 m)

Technical details
- Floor count: 13

Design and construction
- Architect: Smallwood, Reynolds, Stewart, Stewart

Poinsett Plaza (also known as the Carolina First Building) is a 230 ft (70 m) tall postmodern office building located on 104 South Main Street in downtown Greenville, South Carolina. The building has 13 floors and was built in 1999. As of February 2026, it is the 4th-tallest building in Greenville, with the Bank of America Building, One Insignia Financial Plaza, and the Landmark Building being the only buildings taller than it.

The building was built due to a need for more office space in downtown Greenville. At the time of the building's opening in 2000, the main tenant who occupied most of the building was the South Financial Group (who were originally known as the Carolina First Corporation). In 2010, South Financial merged with the Canadian Toronto-Domionion Bank, due to the merger, TD Bank became the building's largest tentant. TD Bank would scale back the workforce in the tower, leaving the tower a third empty.

The building was designed by Smallwood, Reynolds, Stewart, Stewart, who also designed 3344 Peachtree in Atlanta, The Plaza in Clayton Residential Tower in Clayton, the Hearst Tower in Charlotte, 201 North Tryon in Charlotte, the Fifth Third Center in Columbus, and the Viridian Tower in Nashville.

Amenities include two restaurants, a covered parking garage, and a gym.

== See also ==
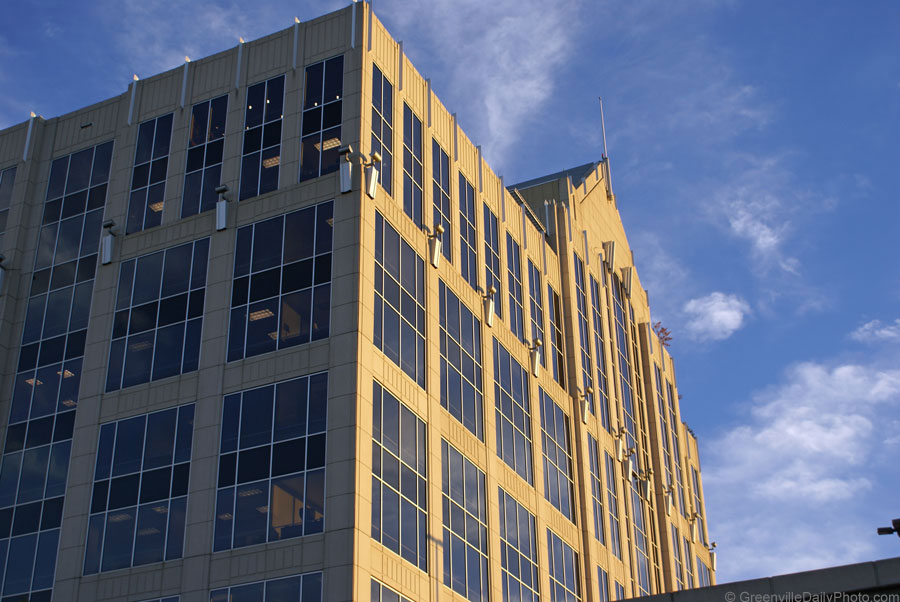
Poinsett Plaza in 2019

- List of tallest buildings in South Carolina
- Peace Center
- Greenville Zoo
- Place of Peace
- Landmark Building (Greenville, South Carolina)
- Liberty Bridge at Falls Park on the Reedy
- Roper Mountain Science Center
- Magnolia Park Town Center
- Bon Secours Wellness Arena
- Regions Bank
