= Charles E. Daniel =

American politician (1895–1964)

Charles Ezra Daniel
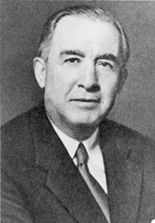

United States Senator from South Carolina
- In office September 6, 1954 – December 23, 1954
- Appointed by: James F. Byrnes
- Preceded by: Burnet R. Maybank
- Succeeded by: Strom Thurmond

Personal details
- Born: November 11, 1895 Elberton, Georgia
- Died: September 13, 1964 (aged 68) Greenville, South Carolina
- Party: Democratic
- Education: The Citadel

Military service
- Years of service: 1917 – 1919
- Rank: Lieutenant
- Battles/wars: First World War

Charles Ezra Daniel (November 11, 1895 – September 13, 1964) was a United States senator from South Carolina and founder of Daniel International Corp.

Born in Elberton, Georgia, he moved with his family to Anderson, South Carolina in 1898. He attended the public schools, was a cadet at The Citadel (Charleston) from 1916 to 1918 and during the First World War served as a lieutenant in the infantry from 1917 to 1919. He was a businessman with interests in construction, banking, building supplies, telecommunications, insurance, and airlines, and was a life trustee of Clemson College and a member of the board of South Carolina Foundation of Independent Colleges.

He and R. Hugh Daniel co-founded Daniel International Construction Corporation, which, at one time, was the largest construction company in the world. The corporation was based in the Landmark Building which is located in Greenville, South Carolina. In 1963 he was given the "Industrialist of the Year" award by President Kennedy.

Daniel was appointed, on September 6, 1954, as a Democrat to the U.S. Senate to fill the vacancy caused by the death of Burnet R. Maybank, and served from September 6, 1954, until his resignation December 23, 1954; he was not a candidate for election to fill the vacancy. He resumed management of his business interests and helped persuade Kohler to build a factory in Spartanburg on a 260-acre lot in 1955. He died in Greenville in 1964 and was interred in Springwood Cemetery.

U.S. Senate
Preceded by Burnet R. Maybank	U.S. senator (Class 2) from South Carolina; September 6, 1954 – December 23, 1954; Served alongside: Olin D. Johnston	Succeeded by Strom Thurmond
