= Ashley House (Paget Parish, Bermuda) =

17th-century cottage in Bermuda

Coordinates: 32°17′N 64°47′W

Ashley House (previously named 'The Crosskeys') is a 17th-century cottage located at 15 Railway Trail in the parish of Paget, Bermuda. The original structure is believed to date from circa 1650. The Government of Bermuda has classified Ashley House as a Grade One listed property, one of only 60 such properties in the entire British Overseas Territory. A Grade One listing is applied to properties that are of significant historic and/or architectural importance to the country.

== Architectural features ==
- Extensive use of juniper wood
- Three large chimneys
- Chimneys separated from the roofline, indicating the prior existence of a thatched roof
- All original Bermuda Cedar beams
- Casement-style windows
