= Main and Gervais =

Office building in Columbia, South Carolina

Tower at Main and Gervais
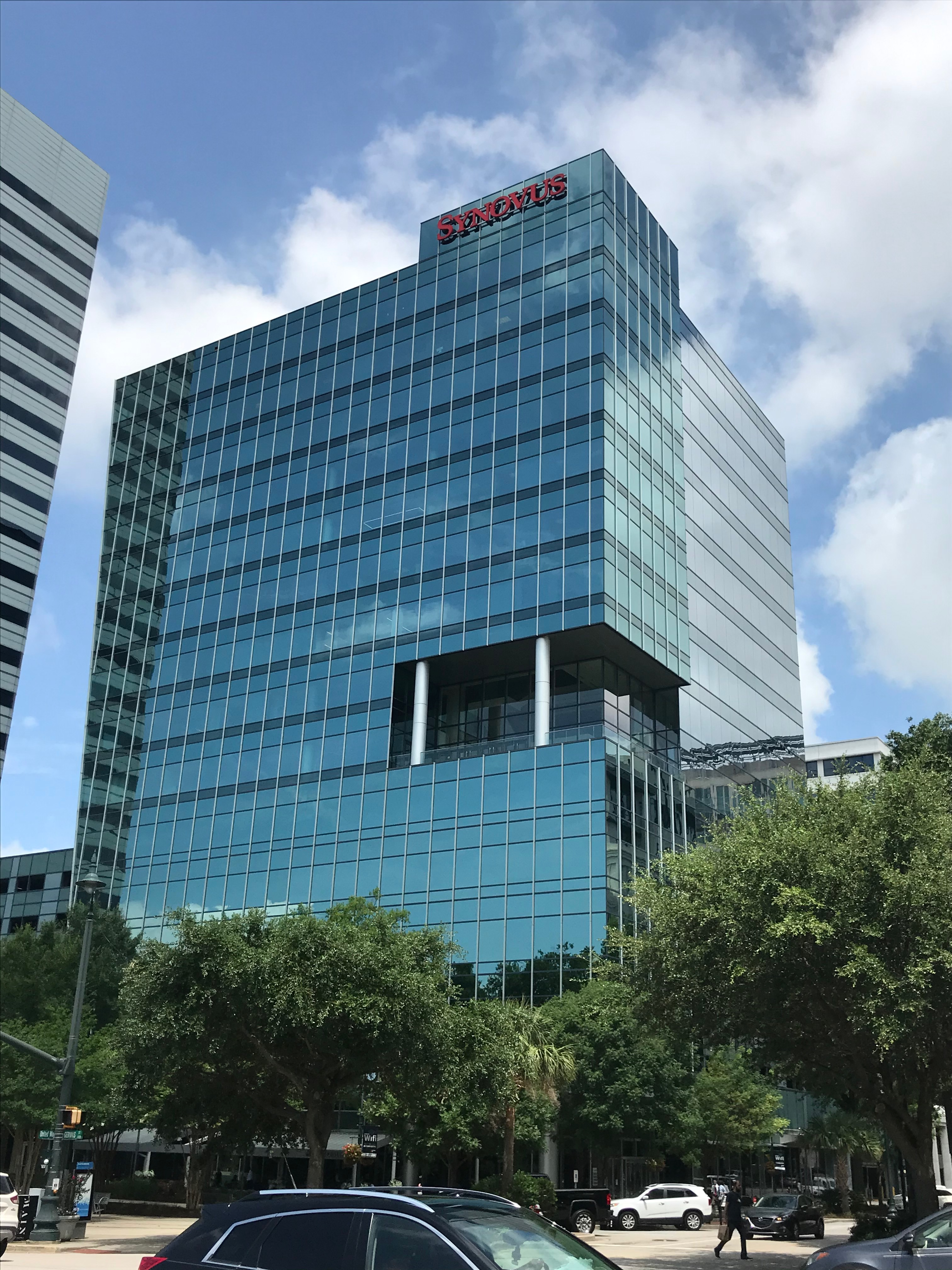
- Main and Gervais building from Gervais Street.
- Interactive map of the Tower at Main and Gervais area

General information
- Status: Completed
- Type: Office
- Location: Main and Gervais Streets, Columbia, South Carolina
- Coordinates: 34.0016°N 81.0341°W
- Construction started: 2008
- Completed: 2009
- Opening: 2009
- Cost: $60 million

Height
- Roof: 270 ft (82 m)

Technical details
- Floor count: 19
- Floor area: 400,000 sq ft (37,000 m^{2})

Design and construction
- Developer: Holder Properties

The Tower at Main and Gervais is a high-rise office building in Columbia, South Carolina. Built in 2009, the tower has light blue glazing and is adorned with columns, giving the building a modern, stylized look. There is also an outdoor dining plaza at the base of the building between its ground and Gervais Street, looking towards the South Carolina State House.

The building's main use is for commercial purposes. However, the building also houses a restaurant, service branches and a parking garage. The tower is the third skyscraper to open on Columbia's Main Street in five years, a development that has reshaped downtown Columbia.

Main and Gervais is currently the most recent fully completed office building in Columbia and South Carolina.
