= Capitol Center (Columbia, South Carolina) =

Office skyscraper in Columbia, South Carolina

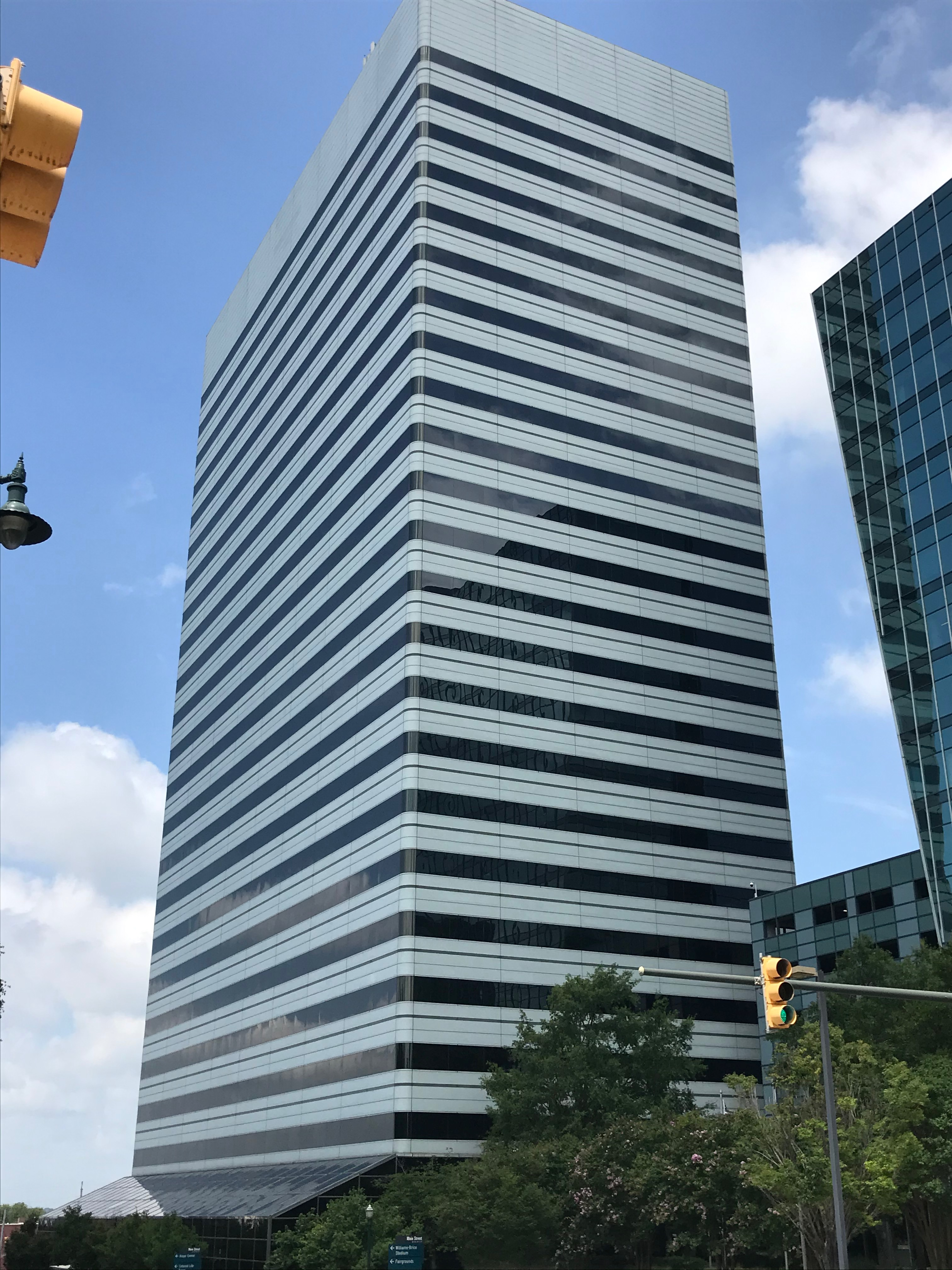
- Capitol Center
- Interactive map of the Capitol Center area
- Alternative names: Truist Building; BB&T Building; AT&T Building; Affinity Building; SouthTrust Tower

General information
- Status: Completed
- Type: Commercial offices
- Location: Assembly and Gervais Streets, Columbia, South Carolina
- Coordinates: 34°0′4″N 81°2′5″W
- Completed: 1985-1987

Height
- Roof: 106.4 m (349 ft)

Technical details
- Floor count: 26
- Floor area: 460,000 sq ft (43,000 m^{2})
- Lifts/elevators: 11

Design and construction
- Architect: GMK Associates

Capitol Center is an office skyscraper in Columbia, South Carolina. At 106.4 m (349 ft), it is the tallest building in South Carolina. The tower has about 1,000 people inside working every week and about 400 offices. A 26-story skyscraper, it was the tallest structure in South Carolina from its completion in December 1987 to the completion of the Prysmian Copper Wire Tower in Abbeville in 2009.

== History ==
The tower was built on the site of the former Wade Hampton Hotel which was imploded in July 1985. This modern building exterior is finished in double-paned tinted glass with horizontal bands of anodized aluminum color panels. The 25-story tower was completed in 1987 during a Columbia high-rise building boom, as the AT&T Building. Naming rights have been previously held by Affinity and SouthTrust Bank. The current signage on the building is held by Truist Bank. During its construction in 1986, gubernatorial candidate Carroll Campbell successfully used the then unfinished structure, whose construction was partially financed by the State of South Carolina, as a symbol for excessive government spending.

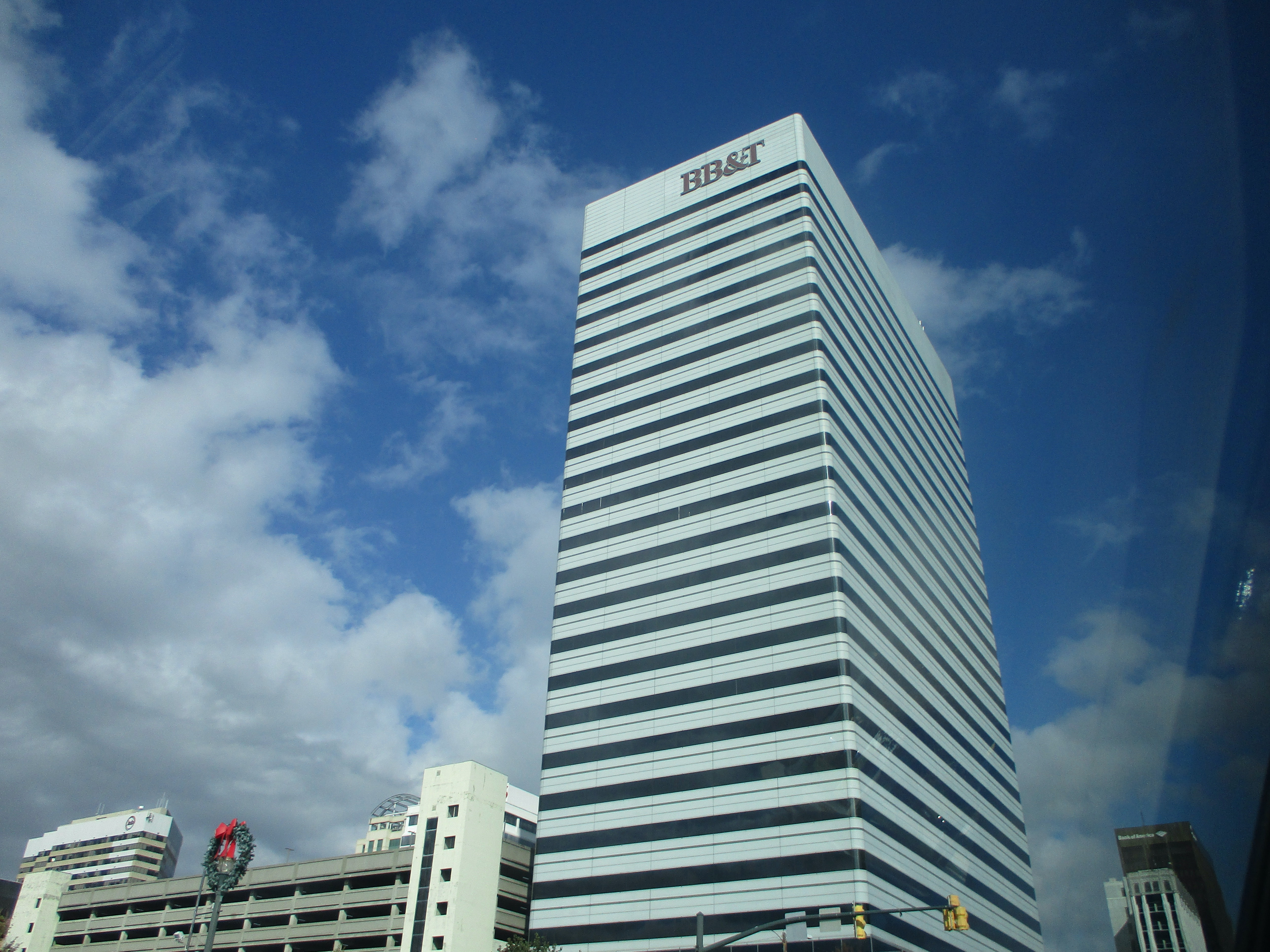
Capitol Center in November 2020

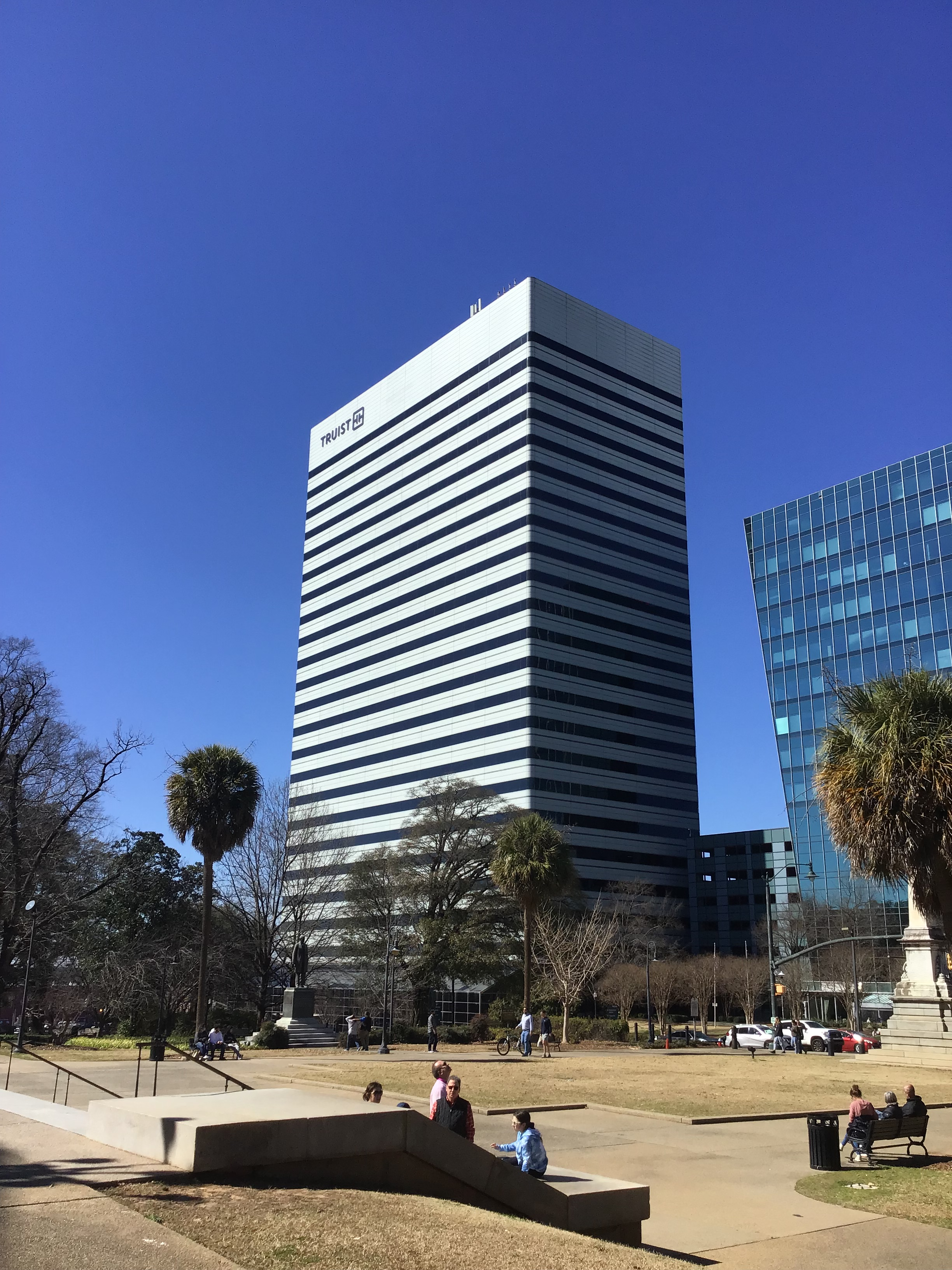
View from the State House steps

Capitol Center contains 460,020 sq ft (42,737 m^{2}) of office space, at over 90% occupancy, the building leases to some state government agencies, several top law firms in the state, and other businesses. Attached to the tower is a 7-story parking garage containing over 1,000 spaces. The 25th floor was home to The Capital City Club, which ceased operations in February 2024.

== See also ==
- List of tallest buildings by U.S. state
