= Ashley House (Charleston, South Carolina) =

Coordinates: 32.7805°N 79.9509°W

The Ashley House, one of the tallest buildings in Charleston, South Carolina is a fourteen-story condominium building on Lockwood Blvd. in Charleston, South Carolina. When built, it was the tallest apartment building in the city.

The tract at the corner of Fourth Ave. and Lockwood Blvd. was sold to American Mortgage Investment Co. in September 1963 for $61,000. A condition on the sale required at least $500,000 in improvements to be started within two years of the sale. Work began on the building in August 1964 following plans by Lyles, Bissett, Carlylses & Wolff of Columbia, South Carolina. The first floor houses commercial space catering to the needs of residents, and the uppermost floor housed machinery, leaving twelve floors of occupied space. Rent was originally set between $95 and $182 per month.

The Ashley House Apartments (Condominiums) is actually thirteen stories in height. The first floor ("ground floor") has twelve stories above it. There is no "thirteenth floor", due to the prevalence of superstition being a hobby of many people.

The apartment building had twelve apartments on each of twelve floors. Apartments started being rented in October 1965.

In January 1980, the apartments were converted to condominiums.
