= South Carolina Poetry Archives =

Coordinates: 34.9246°N 82.4390°W

Materials from the S.C. Poetry Archives on display in the James B. Duke Library.

The South Carolina Poetry Archives at Furman University is a collection of published works, manuscripts, and ephemeral materials from over one hundred authors. It is housed in Greenville, South Carolina, at the Special Collections and Archives department of the James B. Duke Library.

== Purpose ==
Started in 2005, the archives highlights 20th and 21st century poets connected to South Carolina by birth, employment, residence, or subject matter. Among the most extensively collected authors are Gilbert Allen, Claire Bateman, Phebe Davidson, Kurtis Lamkin, and Ronald Moran. The collection includes works of all South Carolina poets laureate, literary fellows selected by the South Carolina Arts Commission and the National Endowment for the Arts, Pushcart Prize winners, Piccolo Spoleto Fiction prize winners, and recipients of many other awards.

In the context of Furman University's emphasis on "engaged learning," the Poetry Archives also provides a gateway for university students. Furman professors draw on the manuscripts, correspondence and ephemeral materials made available in the collection to integrate South Carolina poetry into their curricula and acquaint students with the construction and publication of poetry.

The South Carolina Poetry Archives acquired Ninety-Six Press, established at Furman in 1991, as part of the Department of Special Collections and Archives in the James B. Duke Library at Furman.

== Collection inventory ==
- William Aarnes
  - Learning to Dance
  - Predicaments
- Christopher Abani
  - There are no names for red: poetry and paintings
- Dan Albergotti
  - The boatloads
  - Charon's Manifest
- Gilbert Allen
  - Commandments at Eleven
  - Driving to Distraction
  - In Everything: Poems, 1972-1979
  - Second Chances
  - Catma: Poems
  - Body parts
- Paul Allen
  - American Crawl
  - His longing: (the small penis oratorio)
  - Ground forces
- Ken Autrey
  - Pilgrims: Poems
- Jan Bailey
  - Midnight in the Guest Room : Poems
  - Paper clothes
- Frederick W. Bassett
  - Awake My Heart: Psalms for Life
  - Love: The Song of Songs
- Claire Bateman
  - At the Funeral of the Ether
  - The Bicycle Slow Race
  - Clumsy
  - Friction
  - Leap
  - Coronology
  - Locals: a collection of prose poems
- John Beecher
  - Collected Poems, 1924-1974
  - Morning star: a quarto of poetry
  - Report to the Stockholders and other poems, 1932-1962
- Patricia Bee
  - Mama's Pearls: Poetry to Live By
- Libby Bernardin
  - The book of myth
  - Layers of Song: poems
- Al Black
  - I only left for tea: poems
- Marian Willard Blackwell
  - Glassworks
- Laurel Blossom
  - The papers said
  - Wednesday: New and Selected Poems
  - What's Wrong: Poems
  - Degrees of Latitude: a poem
  - Any Minute: poems
- Rosa Bogar
  - Rosa and other poems: oral poetry
  - Black Woman Sorrow: oral poetry
- Nick Bozanic
  - This once: poems 1976-1996
  - The Long Drive Home
  - One Place
- Colonel O.J. Bond
  - Magnolia Gardens and other verse
- Robert Adger Bowen
  - The Call of the Sea and other verse
- Cathy Smith Bowers
  - The Candle I Hold Up to See You: Poems
  - A Book of Minutes: poems
  - Traveling in Time of Danger
  - A Love that ended yesterday in Texas: poems
- Phil Bowman
  - The museum of childhood
- Alice Cabaniss
  - The Dark Bus and Other Forms of Transport
- Pris Campbell
  - The Nature of Attraction: poems
- Jerri Chaplin
  - Vertically Coastal: poems
- Wayne Cox
  - The Things We Leave Behind
- DéLana R.A. Dameron
  - How God Ends Us
- Debra A. Daniel
  - As is: poems
- Kate Daniels
  - Four Testimonies
  - The White Wave
- Donald Davidson
  - The long street: poems
  - Lee in the Mountains: and other poems, including The Tall Men
  - The Tennessee
- Phebe Davidson
  - Back to Square One: New and Selected Poems
  - Dreameater: Poems
  - The Drowned Man: Poems
  - Lying Down with Grief: Poems
  - A Note on Demographics: Poems
  - The Plumage of Swans
  - Song Dog
  - Twelve Leagues In: Poems
  - Fat moon rising: Poems
  - Milk and brittle bone
  - The Surface of Things: Poems
  - What Holds his to this World
  - Walking to Light: selected poems, 2003-2012
  - Plasma Justice: Poems
- Carol Ann Davis
  - Atlas hour: Poems
  - Psalm: poems
- Kwame Dawes
  - Wisteria : twilight poems from the swamp country
  - Impossible Flying : Poems
  - Requiem : A lament for the dead
  - Midland
- Heather Dearmon
  - Water unto Light
- James Dickey
  - Falling: May Day Sermon, and other poems
  - For A Time and Place
  - Four Seasons: False Youth
  - Puella
  - Strength of Fields
  - The Complete Poems of James Dickey
  - To the White Sea
  - Wayfarer: a voice from the Southern Mountains
  - Night hurdling
  - The Starry Place between the Antlers: why I live in South Carolina
  - In Pursuit of the Grey Soul
  - Deliverance
  - Helmets: poems
- Edith Bannister Dowling
  - A patchwork of poems about South Carolina
- Sterling "Skip" Eisiminger
  - Felix academicus : tales of a happy academic
  - Nonprescription medicine : a versified dictionary of ideas
  - Omi and the Christmas candles : a tale of nine Christmases during the Nazi era
- Carolyn Elkins
  - Angel pays a visit
  - Daedalus rising
- Shellie Enteen
  - Journey to the meaning of love
- Percival Everett
  - Abstraktion und einfühlung
  - Swimming swimmers swimming
  - Re: f (gesture): poems
- Gene Fehler
  - When Main Street Was One Block Long: Poems from a Small Town Childhood
  - Breaking Into a Smile: Poems with a Light Touch
  - Dancing on the Basepaths: baseball poetry and verse
  - The Silly (and Sometimes Serious) side of Sports: poems
  - I hit the ball!: Baseball poems for the young
  - Center field grasses: poems from baseball
- Linda Annas Ferguson
  - It's Hard to Hate a Broken Thing
  - Last Chance to Be Lost
  - Bird Missing from One Shoulder: poems
  - Stepping on Cracks in the Sidewalk: Poems
  - Dirt Sandwich: Poems
- Jayne Jaudon Ferrer
  - Dancing With My Daughter
  - A Mother of Sons
  - A New Mother's Thoughts
  - I am the mother of sons
  - A New Mother's Prayers
  - She of the Rib: Woman Unwrapped
- Nikky Finney
  - Heartwood
  - On Wings Made of Gauze
  - Head Off and Split
  - Rice
  - The World is Round
- Sheree Fitch
  - The poetry experience: choosing and using poetry in the classroom
- Sue Flaster
  - Experimental Primate: Selected poems
- Starkey Flythe, Jr.
  - Paying the Anesthesiologist
  - Driving with Hand Controls
  - They Say Dancing
  - The futile lesson of glue: a collection of poems
- Grace Beacham Freeman
  - Midnight to Dawn
  - No Costumes or Masks
  - Not Set in Stone
  - Stars and the Land
- Keller Cushing Freeman
  - Corinthians
  - Trespass of Venus
  - Walking Kiawah
  - Walking Like a Waterspider
- Richard Garcia
  - Persistence of Objects
  - The other odyssey: poems
  - The chair
  - The flying Garcias
  - Rancho Notorious
- Therese Gleason
  - Libation
- Becky Gibson
  - First Life
- Cecile Goding
  - The women who drink at the sea
- Vera Gómez
  - Barrio voices
- Robert Elliott Gonzales
  - Poems and Paragraphs
- Aly Goodwin
- Barbara G. S. Hagerty
  - The guest house: poems
  - Twinzilla: poems
  - Motherfish: poems
- Lisa Hammond
  - Moving house
- Tim Harkins
  - Chasing the ineffable
- Linda Lee Harper
  - Buckeye: Poems
  - Quake
  - Blue flute
  - Kiss, kiss
- Joseph Harris
  - Countries of the mind
- Mary Hutchins Harris
  - A tongue full of yeses
- Ashley Mace Havird
  - Dirt Eaters
  - The garden of the fugitives
  - Sleeping with Animals
- Terrance Hayes
  - Wind in a Box
  - How to be drawn
  - Lighthead
  - Muscular Music
  - Hip Logic
- Ann Herlong-Bodman
  - Pulled out of sleep
  - Voices over water
- Sean Hill
  - Blood ties & brown liquor: poems
- Evelyn Horry
  - A Confidence on Parting
- Janet Carr Hull
  - Gravity
- Ellen E. Hyatt
- Helen von Kolnitz Hyer
  - What the wind forgets a woman's heart remembers
  - The magnificent squeak
  - Santee Songs
- Sue Lile Inman
  - Voice Lessons
  - Miriam in the wilderness
- Cynthia Sheperd Jaskwhich
  - Word Play
- Melissa Carol Johnson
  - Looking twice at the world
- Susie Dawson Johnson
  - The fields beyond
- Thomas Johnson
  - The costume: new and selected poems
- Geraldine Batson Jones
  - From muddy streets to green pastures
- Debra Kaufman
  - A certain light
- Angela Kelly
  - Voodoo for the other woman
  - Post script from the house of dreams
- Julia Koets
  - Hold like Owls
- Kurtis Lamkin
  - Magic Yams
  - Queen of Carolina
  - El Shabazz
  - Kora Poems
- John Lane
  - Against Information and other poems
  - As the World Around Us Sleeps
  - Midnight on the Water
  - The Dead Father Poems
  - Noble Trees of the South Carolina Upcountry
  - Abandoned quarry : new and selected poems
  - My paddle to the sea: eleven days on the river of the Carolinas
  - Circling home
  - Chattooga: descending into the myth of deliverance river
  - Waist deep in black water
- Susan Ludvigson
  - The Beautiful Noon of No Shadow
  - Escaping the House of Certainty
  - Sweet Confluence: New and Selected Poems
  - The Swimmer: Poems
  - Everything winged must be dreaming
  - To Find the Gold: Poems
  - Northern Lights
  - Trinity: Poems
- Nan Lundeen
  - The pantyhose declarations: poems
- James J. Lundy Jr.
  - All I can be is myself
- Michael Hugh Lythgoe
  - Holy Week
- Ed Madden
  - Prodigal: variations
  - Signals
  - Nest
  - Sebastian
  - My father's house
- Sandra Marshburn
- Joel McCollough
  - Cool Granaries of the Night
- Terri McCord
  - In the company of animals
  - The art and the Wait
- Carrie Allen McCray
  - Ota Benga under my mother's roof
  - Piece of Time
- Ray McManus
  - Driving Through the Country Before You Are Born
  - Left Behind
  - Red Dirt Jesus
  - Punch.
- Jerred Metz
  - Brains 25¢ drive in
- Susan Meyers
  - Keep and Give Away
  - My dear, dear stagger grass
- Ronald Moran
  - The Blurring of Time
  - Diagramming the Clear Sky: Poems
  - Fish Out of Water
  - Getting the Body to Dance Again
  - Greatest Hits, 1965-2000
  - Life on the Rim
  - Saying These Things
  - So Simply Means the Rain: Poems
  - Waiting
  - The tree in the mind
  - Louis Simpson
  - The Jane Poems
  - Sudden Fictions
- Rick Mulkey
  - Before the Age of Reason
  - Bluefield Breakdown: Poems
  - Greatest Hits: 1994-2003
  - Ravenous
  - Toward Any Darkness
- Horace Mungin
  - Now See Here, Homes
  - A different point of view
  - Subway after the Irish
  - Sleppy Willie Sings the Blues
  - Truth and absurdities: social and political commentary
  - Poetic portraits: the African people of San Juan Hill
- Scott Owens
  - For one who knows how to own land
  - Something knows the moment
  - Country roads: travels through rural North Carolina
  - Shadows trail them home
  - Paternity
  - The fractured world
  - Persistence of faith
- Frances Pearce
  - Those Carolina parakeets once far from extinct
- Karen M. Peluso
  - The mother-face in the mirror
- Bryan Penberthy
  - Lucktown
- Carol Peters
  - Muddy prints, water shine: poems
- Jim Peterson
  - The resolution of Eve: poems
  - The bob and weave
  - Paper crown
  - Greatest hits 1984-2000
  - The owning stone
  - The shadow adjuster
  - An afternoon with K: poems
  - Carvings on a prayer tree
  - The man who grew silent
- Emily Post Pitts
  - Flight
- Eugene Platt
  - An Original Sin, and other poems
  - Summer Days with Daughter
  - South Carolina State line: new and selected poems 1968-1980
  - Coffee and solace
- Katherine Porter
  - Celestial Electric Set
- Jennifer R. Pournelle
  - Excavations: a city cycle
- Brittney Blaskowitz Prichard
  - Lessons in disaster
- Ron Rash
  - Raising the Dead
  - The cove
  - The world made straight
  - Saints at the River
  - Casualties
  - Among the Believers
  - Eureka Mill
  - Waking
- Glenis Redmond
  - Under the sun
  - Word power
  - Monumental poems by Glenis Redmond
  - Backbone
- Ennis Rees
  - Poems
- Alfred Sandlin Reid
  - Furman University: toward a new identity, 1925-1975
  - Lady Godiva's lover
  - Crumbling Stones
  - Botanical Gardening in Greenville
  - The arts in Greenville 1800-1960
- Clinton P. Rice
  - Over the years
- Paul Rice
- Alex Richardson
  - Porch Night on Walnut Street
- William "Bill" Rogers
  - What really matters
  - Airish beasts
  - Fractal geometries
  - Beacon Station and other poems
  - The ball of the world, the ball of the eye
  - The three genres and interpretations of the lyric
  - Image and abstraction: six Middle English Religious lyrics
- Emily Rosko
  - Prop Rockery
  - Raw goods inventory
- Archibald Rutledge
  - The Ballad of the Howling Hound, and other poems
  - The Beauty of the Night
  - Poems: in honor of South Carolina tricentennial
  - Days off in Dixie
  - Claws
- Sherod Santos
  - The Perishing
  - The pilot star elegies
  - The city of woman: a sequence of poems and prose
- Roy Seeger
  - The boy whose hands were birds: poems
- Shuler, Jay
  - A confidence on parting
  - South Carolina Birds of the foothills
- Kimberly Jane Simms
  - Collected Poems
- Bennie Lee Sinclair
  - The Arrowhead Scholar
  - The lynching
  - The Endangered: New and Selected Poems
  - Little Chicago Suite
- Warren Slesinger
  - Greatest Hits: 1970-2002
  - The evening light
  - A word for it: poems
- Brian Slusher
  - Waking in the Driver's Seat
- Michael Smith
  - Small Industry
- Anne Soni
  - The body that shadows this space
- Charlene Spearen
  - A book of exquisite disasters
  - Without possessions
- Laura Stamps
  - Cat Daze: New and Selected Poems
  - Cats and Chrysanthemums: New & Collected Poems
  - In the Garden
  - Joy Unspeakable: New Poems
  - The Year of the Cat: New Poems
- Laura Buist Starnes
  - Cliffs and Columbines
  - An ex post facto experiment to evaluate the effectiveness of a summer remedial reading clinic
- Cassie Premo Steele
  - Ruin
  - Moon days: creative writings about menstruation
  - We heal from memory: Sexton, Lorde, Anzaldua, and the poetry of witness
  - My peace: a year of yoga at Amsa Studios
  - Shamrock and Lotus
  - This is how honey runs
  - The pomegranate papers
  - Wednesday
- Celisa Steele
  - How Language is Lost
- Susan Finch Stevens
  - Lettered bones
- Dennis Ward Stiles
  - Saigon Tea
  - The fire in which we burn: poems
  - A strange wind rises
  - Humdinger
  - Spit: and other poems
  - Black mirrors
- Nancy Drew Taylor
  - Taking flight
  - Stepping on air
- Dorothy Perry Thompson
  - Fly with the Puffin
  - Priest in Aqua Boa
- Sheila Tombe
- Deno Trakas
  - Human and puny: poems
  - Ryan G. Van Cleave
  - Elephant Tracks Across Topeka
  - The Florida Letters
  - Greatest Hits, 1992-2002
  - Ha Ha Tonka: A Book of Rune
  - Imagine the Dawn: the Civil War sonnets
  - Landscape & Dream: Poetry
  - The Magical Breasts of Britney Spears
  - Ohio Letters: 19 Original Poems
  - The Roots of Roses: 20 Poems of Love & Longing
  - Say Hello
  - The Tallahassee Letters
  - The Chicago Letters
  - Mensa Bob: Lost in America
- Henry Vereen
  - Water
- Jo Ann Walker
  - Home at dark
- Jillian Marie Weise
  - The book of goodbyes
  - Translating the body
  - The amputee's guide to sex
- Ceille Baird Welch
  - Readings
- Marjory Heath Wentworth
  - Noticing Eden
  - The endless repetition of an ordinary miracle
  - Shackles
  - Despite gravity
  - What the water gives me
  - New and selected poems
- Dana Wildsmith
  - Our bodies remember
  - Annie
  - One good hand
  - Back to abnormal: surviving with an old farm in the new south
- Katherine Williams
  - Cranioglyph: a memoir in verse
- William W. woodward
  - The last hopeless romantic
- Gamel Woolsey
  - Patterns on the sand
  - Death's other kingdom: a Spanish village in 1936
  - One way of love
  - The Search for Demeter
  - the weight of human hours
  - The last leaf falls
  - Twenty-eight sonnets
  - Spanish fairy stories
  - Middle Earth
- William Wright
  - Night field anecdote: poems
  - Bledsoe: a poem
- Ivan Young
  - A shape in the waves
- Tommy Scott Young
  - Black Blues and Shiny Songs

== See also ==
- Furman University
- Greenville, South Carolina
- South Carolina Baptist Historical Collection
