= Hub City Writers Project =

American nonprofit organization

The Hub City Writers Project is a nonprofit organization in Spartanburg, South Carolina, dedicated to cultivating readers and nurturing writers through its independent small press, community bookstore, and diverse literary programming. The independent press publishes books of literature and culture with an emphasis on the Southern experience by new and established authors. Now in its twenty-fifth year, Hub City is the winner of four IPPY awards from Independent Publisher magazine; the Elizabeth O’Neill Verner Award for contribution to the arts in South Carolina; and the South Carolina Governor's Award for the Humanities.

In addition to sponsoring creative writing workshops, readings, and contests in its hometown of Spartanburg, Hub City Press publishes five to eight books a year, including the winner of the South Carolina First Novel Prize.

In June 2010 the non-profit organization opened the Hub City Bookshop, an independent bookstore at 186 West Main Street in Spartanburg on the ground floor of the Masonic Temple (built 1928). The store specializes in new releases, regional books, children's books and Hub City Press titles.

== History ==
In May 1995 a trio of writers began to talk in a Spartanburg coffeehouse about how they could help preserve a sense of place in their rapidly changing Southern city. What their community needed, they said, was a literary identity. Modeling their organization after the Depression-era Federal Writers' Project, they marshaled the talents of writers across South Carolina to create a series of books characterized by a strong sense of place. They chose the name Hub City Writers Project because it both invoked Spartanburg's past as a 19th-century railroad center and challenged them to make their hometown a center for literary arts.

Hub City was shepherded in its early days by Wofford College poet John Lane, journalists Betsy Teter and Gary Henderson, and photographer/graphic designer Mark Olencki; gradually the organization broadened its scope by publishing nearly 250 South Carolina writers, creating a 15-member board of directors, and attracting the financial support of hundreds of South Carolina residents and businesses.

== Hub City Press ==
Hub City Press is known for publishing "new and unsung writers from the American South" and has emerged as the South's premier independent literary press. The press offers four publishing series: the C. Michael Curtis Short Story Book Prize, the New Southern Voices Poetry Book Prize, the South Carolina Novel Prize, and the Cold Mountain Fund Series, in partnership with National Book award-winning author Charles Frazier. Their curated list champions diverse authors and books that don’t fit into the commercial or academic publishing landscape, including: people of color, gender diversity, LGBTQIA, people with disabilities, as well as ethnic, cultural, and religious minorities. The press has published over one-hundred high-caliber literary works, including novels, short stories, poetry, memoir, and books emphasizing the region's culture and history. The Hub City Press publication list includes works by such writers as Ron Rash, Carter Sickels, Leesa Cross-Smith, George Singleton, J. Drew Lanham, Ashley M. Jones, Jessica Handler, Ashleigh Bryant Phillips, Anjali Enjeti, Halle Hill, and Grey Wolfe LaJoie. Editors of Hub City anthologies include The Atlantic senior editor C. Michael Curtis, Kwame Dawes, Cinelle Barnes, and David Joy.

== See also ==
- South Carolina literature
