= Grace Beacham Freeman =

American poet

Grace Freeman
- Born: Grace Beacham; February 18, 1916; Spartanburg, South Carolina
- Died: October 28, 2002 (aged 86); Asheville, North Carolina
- Education: B.A., Converse College
- Occupations: Poet; writer; columnist
- Writing career
- Notable awards: South Carolina Poet Laureate

Grace Beacham Freeman (February 18, 1916 – October 28, 2002) was an American poet, columnist, short story writer and educator. She wrote a syndicated column "At Our House" from 1954 to 1964 and was named by Governor Richard Wilson Riley as the fourth South Carolina Poet Laureate from 1985 to 1986.

== Biography ==
=== Early life and education ===
Freeman was born on February 18, 1916, in Spartanburg, South Carolina. Her parents were Henry O. Beacham and the former Grace Bailey. She received a Bachelor's degree in English from Converse College in 1937. There, she triple-majored in drama, English, and Latin.

=== Career ===
Freeman's poetry career started early when she had a poem published in a school literary journal named The Scribbler. While in college, she edited the student magazine.

After college, Freeman worked as an English teacher in various South Carolina public schools from 1937 to 1941 when she decided to do some post-graduate studies at the University of North Carolina at Chapel Hill. "Her early writing talents were evident, as she began publishing poetry soon after her student years, with her first adult poems appearing in 1939." During the late 1940s, she taught creative dramatics for children in North Carolina and New Orleans as well as hosted a radio program in Durham, North Carolina called Presenting Grace Freeman.

From 1954 until 1964, Freeman wrote a syndicated column about family life as the mother of four children called "At Our House", which was distributed by King Features Syndicate. She wrote many plays and dramas for radio and television along with feature articles for various newspapers and magazines including The Times-Picayune Magazine, The Charlotte Observer, and The State.

For 13 years, she was a Poet-in-the-Schools with the South Carolina Arts Commission and has also served as a poet therapist with Hall Institute, the University of North Carolina at Chapel Hill School of Medicine, the American Psychiatric Association, and the National Poetry Therapy Foundation.

She served as editor of the alumni magazines of both Winthrop College (1962–1974) and Converse College (1967–1971).

=== Poet laureateship ===
Freeman was named to be South Carolina's fourth poet laureate by Governor Dick Riley in 1985. Originally a life-time appointment, Riley changed the position some during his governorship and appointed Freeman to only a one-year term of office.

=== Personal life ===
Her husband, John Alderman Freeman, was a biology and zoology professor who taught many years at Winthrop University. He previously had taught at Wake Forest University, his alma mater. John Freeman was also an author and ran a small independent publishing firm in Rock Hill. They were married on June 11, 1941 and moved to Rock Hill in 1952. The Freemans had four children. Freeman was active in the American Association of University Women and was on the executive board of the Rock Hill, South Carolina, Branch, 1961–1962. While still remaining active in community affairs, the couple retired to Brevard, North Carolina in 1987.

Grace Freeman died after a short illness on October 28, 2002, in Asheville, North Carolina. Her husband, John, died on January 5, 2007.

== Awards and honors ==
- The Stephen Vincent Benet Award for Poet Lore – 1974
- South Carolina Poet Laureate – 1985–1986
- Fortner Writer's Award, St. Andrews University – 1992

== Works ==
She received much encouragement and instruction from South Carolina's first poet laureate, Archibald Rutledge. He lived for some time in Spartanburg as well and they became friends. Soon, he became her mentor. He encouraged her to submit some of her poetry to The Saturday Evening Post which was accepted and published. Later, after taking a workshop with poet and professor James Dickey, Freeman started to develop a more contemporary style of poetry.

Apart from book form, some of Freeman's poetry as also appeared in The Saturday Evening Post, The New Republic, The South Carolina Review, and other magazines.

Much of her early letters, manuscripts and other materials (up to 1977) were donated by Freeman to Winthrop University's Louise Pettus Archives and Special Collections.

=== Books ===
- Children Are Poetry (1951)
- What about the Rest of the Children?. Action Program to Promote Quality Preschool Education in Communities in South Carolina. 1968.
- No Costumes or Masks. Red Clay Books. 1975.
- Midnight to Dawn. St. Andrews Press. 1981. ISBN 978-0-9326623-7-8.
- Stars and the Land. John's Press. 1983. ISBN 978-0-9607730-7-7.
- Not Set in Stone. John's Press. 1986. ISBN 978-0-9607730-9-1.
- This Woman Called Mother. St. Andrews Press. 1992. ISBN 978-1-8799340-3-0.
- Remembering a Gentle Father. St. Andrews College Press. 1996. ISBN 978-1-8799344-5-0.

Some work also has appeared in the anthology Talking Out the Fire by Lawrence Don Joiner (John's Press, 1983 ISBN 978-0-9607730-6-0).
