= Bennie Lee Sinclair =

American writer

- Born: April 15, 1939; Greenville, South Carolina
- Died: May 22, 2000 (aged 61); Greenville, South Carolina
- Education: Furman University
- Occupation: Poet
- Spouse: Don Lewis
- Writing career
- Notable awards: South Carolina Poet Laureate

Bennie Lee Sinclair (April 15, 1939 – May 22, 2000) was an American poet, novelist, and short story writer. She was named by Governor Richard Wilson Riley as the fifth South Carolina Poet Laureate from 1986 to 2000.

== Biography ==
=== Early life and education ===
Sinclair was born on April 15, 1939, in Greenville, South Carolina. She was born to William Graham Sinclair Sr., and the former Bennie Lee Ward. Her parents separated when she was five years old and she stayed with her mother. Sinclair graduated from Greenville High School in 1956 and then graduated from Furman University in 1961. She was elected as an alumna member of Phi Beta Kappa in 1989. Her brother Walt (Waldo Graham Sinclair Jr., nicknamed "Buster") was a 1967 graduate of The Citadel and was the inspiration for her poetry collection The Arrowhead Scholar.

=== Career ===
Sinclair's talents exhibited early as one of her poems was published in a national teacher's journal, submitted by her first-grade teacher. Later, she returned to her alma mater and becoming a creative writing instructor at Furman University for many years. Her first poem as an adult was published in the journal Foxfire in 1968.

=== Poet laureateship ===
Sinclair was named to be South Carolina's fifth poet laureate by Governor Dick Riley in 1986. At the time, she was the youngest poet laureate the state had appointed, at age 47. The poet laureate often reads and/or writes a poem for the South Carolina Governor's inauguration. In 1999, at the inauguration of Governor Jim Hodges, high winds blew her papers away, but she proceeded to recite the poem from memory.

=== Personal life ===
Sinclair married sculptor Don Lewis in 1958. Lewis was a former Marine whom she met while they were both freshmen at Furman. They lived most of their life on a 135-acre wildlife and plant sanctuary in the Cleveland community of Greenville County, South Carolina, which they moved into in 1976.

Sinclair had suffered from diabetes and suffered many ailments over the last several years of her life. In 1993, she underwent a kidney transplant. She died of an apparent heart attack on May 22, 2000, in Greenville, South Carolina.

== Awards and honors ==
Sinclair was one of the featured writers of the Southern Appalachian Writers Collection exhibition in the 1980s at the University of North Carolina at Asheville. The university still maintains the materials in that collection. Her 1990 book of poetry, Lord of Spring, was nominated for a Pulitzer Prize for Poetry.

Other awards include:

- Stephen Vincent Benet Award for narrative poem – 1970
- The Best American Short Stories – 1972
- The South Carolina Review poetry award – 1972
- Excellence in Writing Award in poetry, Winthrop College – 1978
- South Carolina Poet Laureate – 1986–2000
- Book of the Year, Appalachian Writers Association (for Lords of Spring) – 1991

== Works ==
Sinclair published works included a novel, short stories, and poetry:

- Little Chicago Suite (poetry, 1971)
- Taproots: A Study in Cultural Exploration, (as editor 1975)
- The Arrowhead Scholar (poetry, 1978)
- The Fine Arts Center Story: A Living History (as editor, 1980)
- South Carolina's International Greenville: A Guide (with Linda Shirley Robertson and Lori Storie-Pahlitzsch, 1982)
- Lord of Spring (poetry, 1990)
- The Endangered: New and Selected Poems (poetry, 1992)
- The Lynching (novel, 1992)
- Appalachian Trilogy (short stories)

In addition to her collections, some of her writings have been anthologized and have appeared in magazines and journals such as Foxfire, Ms., North American Review, and The South Carolina Review. In 1994, Sinclair composed the alma mater for Coastal Carolina University. The Bennie Lee Sinclair Papers, 1921-2007 are housed at Special Collections and Archives at Furman University.
