= South Carolina literature =

Overview of literature of South Carolina, United States

The literature of South Carolina, United States, includes fiction, poetry, and nonfiction. Representative authors include Dorothy Allison, Daniel Payne and William Gilmore Simms.

== History ==
A printing press began operating in Charleston in 1731.

Literary figures of the antebellum period included Paul Hamilton Hayne (1830-1886), James Matthews Legaré (1823-1859), William Gilmore Simms (1806-1870), Henry Timrod (1829-1867). The Southern Review was published in Charleston from 1828 through 1832. The Carolina Housewife cookbook was published in Charleston in 1847.

In the 1920s Julia Peterkin (1880-1961) wrote about the Gullah. DuBose Heyward's (1885-1940) 1925 novel Porgy "explored interactions among the black residents of Charleston's Catfish Row."

The South Carolina Review literary journal was founded at Furman University in Greenville in 1968, later moving to Clemson University.

=== Upstate ===
The Upstate (or Upcountry) includes the mountains of Oconee and Pickens Counties, the Greenville-Spartanburg metro area, and the many mill communities in the triangle between Charlotte, Columbia, and the Georgia border. The region is best encapsulated by Ben Robertson's memoir Red Hills and Cotton, which describes life in the New South mill culture in the South Carolina "backcountry."

In the late 20th and 21st centuries, literature in this region flourished. Notable books include Dori Sanders' Clover, Dorothy Allison's Bastard Out of Carolina, and the short stories of George Singleton. Oconee, Pickens and Anderson counties have been referred to as the "dark corner," allegedly because it took so long for the region to get electricity. Novelists Ron Rash, Mark Powell and others have explored the region's isolation and history of lawlessness.

The Upstate is also home to a thriving literary arts community, including Spartanburg's Hub City Writers Project. Another literary group is Wits End Poetry, established in 2002.

=== Lowcountry ===
The South Carolina Lowcountry includes Charleston, Beaufort, Hilton Head and sea islands. Novelists Dorothea Benton Frank, Josephine Humphreys, and the late Pat Conroy captured the flavor of the Lowcountry, the rhythms of the coast, Charleston's changing society, and the romantic myth of the region. Other notable works from the region include Padgett Powell's novel Edisto.

== Organizations ==
The Poetry Society of South Carolina began in Charleston in 1920. The Spartanburg Hub City Writers Project launched in 1995. Wits End Poetry was launched in 2002.

== See also ==
- Category:Writers from South Carolina
- List of newspapers in South Carolina
- Category:South Carolina in fiction
- Category:Libraries in South Carolina
- Southern United States literature
- American literary regionalism

== Bibliography ==
- Lucian Lamar Knight, ed. (1913). "Fifty Reading Courses: South Carolina". Library of Southern Literature. Vol. 16. Atlanta: Martin and Hoyt Company. p. 207+. hdl:2027/uc1.31175034925258 – via HathiTrust.
- Elsie Dershem (1921). "South Carolina". Outline of American State Literature. Lawrence, Kansas: World Company – via Internet Archive.
- Federal Writers' Project (1941), "Literature", South Carolina: a Guide to the Palmetto State, American Guide Series, Boston: Houghton Mifflin, pp. 131–146, hdl:2027/mdp.39015008031521
- G. Thomas Tanselle (1971). Guide to the Study of United States Imprints. Harvard University Press. ISBN 978-0-674-36761-6. (Includes information about South Carolina literature)
- Thorne Compton (2001). "Literature of South Carolina". In Joseph M. Flora; Lucinda Hardwick MacKethan (eds.). Companion to Southern Literature: Themes, Genres, Places, People, Movements, and Motifs. Louisiana State University Press. pp. 815-823. ISBN 978-0-8071-2692-9.
