= Dede Wilson =

American poet and writer

- Born: Marilyn Marie Coco; Alexandria, Louisiana, U.S.
- Education: H. Sophie Newcomb Memorial College; Louisiana State University (BS)
- Occupations: Poet; writer

Dede Wilson (born Marilyn Marie Coco) is an American poet and writer. She has published short stories, essays, seven books of poetry, and a family memoir. Her fourth book of poetry, Eliza: The New Orleans Years has also been produced as a one-woman show.

Wilson has published stories and poems in many literary journals including Beloit Poetry Journal, Poet Lore, Tar River Poetry, The South Carolina Review, New Orleans Review, Painted Bride Quarterly, The Asheville Poetry Review, Spoon River Poetry Review, The Carolina Quarterly, Southern Poetry Review, Cave Wall, Nimrod, and The Cream City Review.

Her first book Glass was a finalist in the Persephone Press Competition. Her second book Sea of Small Fears won the 2001 Main Street Rag Chapbook Competition. She was a winner in the Blumenthal Readers' and Writers' Competition and has taught poetry workshops for the North Carolina Poetry Society and at Queens University of Charlotte.

== Biography ==
Dede Wilson was born and raised in Alexandria, Louisiana. In 1960, she moved to Dallas, Texas, where she was Travel Editor of the now-defunct Dallas Times Herald. She did her undergraduate work at Newcomb College of Tulane University from 1955 to 1957 and then transferred to Louisiana State University where she graduated in 1959 with a B.S. in journalism.

== Under The Music Of Blue ==
Released in 2017 the collection of poems was well received. David E. Poster wrote in the Wild Goose Poetry Review "Ah, that siren, Dede Wilson. Her new collection, Under the Music of Blue, pulls one in with beautifully rendered sound and imagery. Its beauty comes from mastery of craft: command of the vowel register, fluent pacing and repetition, facility with echoes and nuances."

== Eliza: The New Orleans Years ==
In 1837 Dede Wilson's great-great grandmother Eliza Moore Christie Parker sailed from England to New Orleans, married the ship's captain during the voyage, saw her husband killed in a duel, and ended up marrying the man who shot him. In 1998 Wilson wrote a memoir, using her mother's research, that includes the story of her remarkable ancestor. But the story continued to haunt her, and in 2010 she based her fourth book of poetry on Eliza's life and called it Eliza: The New Orleans Years.

Part history, part fiction, blending poetry and narrative, the book caused The Charlotte Observer's reading life editor Pam Kelley to say, "Here's a sentiment you don't often hear: I picked up a new poetry book and couldn't put it down". The story has also been adapted for the stage. It was first performed as a one-woman show in the Flex Theatre at Jackson Academy in Jackson, Mississippi in April 2011. The show subsequently opened at the Carolina Actors Studio Theatre in Charlotte, North Carolina in May 2012.

== Books ==
- 2024 Longing for the Pleiades: A Life of Wonder Under the Stars
- 2019 Mrs. H. and Her Tooty-Falooty Ways ISBN 978-1-59948-739-7
- 2017 Under the Music of Blue ISBN 978-1-942371-26-7
- 2013 Near Waking ISBN 978-1-62229-268-4
- 2010 Eliza: The New Orleans Years ISBN 1-59948-259-2
- 2004 One Nightstand ISBN 1-930907-55-9
- 2001 Sea of Small Fears ISBN 1-930907-06-0
- 1998 Glass ISBN 1-879009-36-6
- 1998 Fourth Child, Second Daughter: The memories of Dorothy Whittington Coco and biographical accounts of her ancestors composed of letters, diaries, clippings, and reminiscences (editor) ISBN 0-9664811-0-0
