= South Carolina Baptist Historical Collection =

Coordinates: 34.9246°N 82.4390°W

The Special Collections and Archives Department at Furman University, where the Baptist Historical Collection is housed.

The South Carolina Baptist Historical Collection at Furman University is a comprehensive archives that documents individuals, churches, and associations in South Carolina Baptist history. Located in Greenville, South Carolina, it is housed in the Special Collections and Archives department of the James B. Duke Library.

== History ==
The history of the collection begins in 1830 when the South Carolina Baptist Convention asked Furman University, at the time known as the Furman Academy and Theological Institution, to create an archives for Furman records and denominational resources. The academy's fledgling library, just four years old, contained only a few donations and professors' personal collections. Over the next sixty years, the library grew and its collection of Baptist materials was formally organized into the Baptist Historical Collection. Professor Harvey Toliver Cook was the man responsible for the compilation and appellation of the collection.

When Furman University moved to its new campus in the late 1950s, the South Carolina Baptist Historical Collection received renewed attention. Loulie Latimer Owens, co-founder of the South Carolina Baptist Historical Society, was hired in 1961 as Furman's first Special Collections Librarian. She helped relocate and reorganize the collection in its new home in the Pitts Wing of the Duke Library.

Although Furman University and the South Carolina Baptist Convention separated in 1992, the Baptist Historical Collection was still considered the official repository of the convention until 2002. At that time, the convention decided to begin maintaining its own organizational records; however, Furman continues to house records pertaining to individual churches, associations and individuals in the convention. Currently, the collection boasts records for more than 500 Baptist churches and contains numerous published books as well as church histories, congregational records, associational minutes, biographical materials, newsletters, hymnals, and sermons.

== See also ==
- Furman University
- Greenville, South Carolina
- South Carolina Poetry Archives
