= Grey Wolfe LaJoie =

American fiction writer

- Occupation: Writer; teacher
- Education: University of Alabama (MFA)
- Notable works: Little Ones (2024)
- Notable awards: O. Henry Award (2023); Pushcart Prize (2024)

Website
- greywolfelajoie.com

Grey Wolfe LaJoie is an American writer from Western North Carolina. They are the author of Little Ones (2024) and several short stories. They received a 2023 O. Henry Award and 2024 Pushcart Prize.

LaJoie holds a Master of Fine Arts from the University of Alabama. They have worked for Auburn University's Alabama Prison Arts & Education Project, teaching creative writing. They have described growing up in a family affected by poverty, addiction, criminality, and mental illness, and have said that their work in prisons reinforced for them "the power and importance of levity" and influenced the mixture of gravity and play in their writing.

== Little Ones (2024) ==
LaJoie's debut short story collection, Little Ones, was published by Hub City Press in 2024. The book collects 21 short stories along with illustrations and graphic pieces. Several stories are narrated by animals, including a road-killed raccoon in "Frank". Others use non-narrative forms: "Questions" is written as a questionnaire and "Wiki" as a Wikipedia entry. LaJoie has described "Snek & Goose" as a "distorted memoir-as-bedtime-story". The Atlanta Journal-Constitution noted that the piece depicts a boy named Grey whose brother has served time in prison.

Writing in the Atlanta Journal-Constitution, Leah Tyler described the book as an experimental debut centered on animals, children, and other figures that life has passed over. In Appalachian Journal, novelist Mesha Maren compared the stories to the 1980s American literary minimalism sometimes known as Kmart realism, particularly the fiction of Bobbie Ann Mason and Frederick Barthelme. Publishers Weekly included the collection in a feature on notable fall 2024 books from independent presses.

One story from the collection, "The Locksmith", received a 2023 O. Henry Award and a 2024 Pushcart Prize.

== Awards and honors ==
- O. Henry Prize (2023), for "The Locksmith"
- Pushcart Prize (2024), for "The Locksmith"

== Works ==
- Little Ones. Hub City Press, 2024. ISBN 9798885740395.
