= Felix Borowski =

American composer

Felix Borowski (March 10, 1872 – September 6, 1956) was a British/American composer and teacher. He taught composers Silvestre Revueltas and Louise Cooper Spindle at Chicago Musical College.

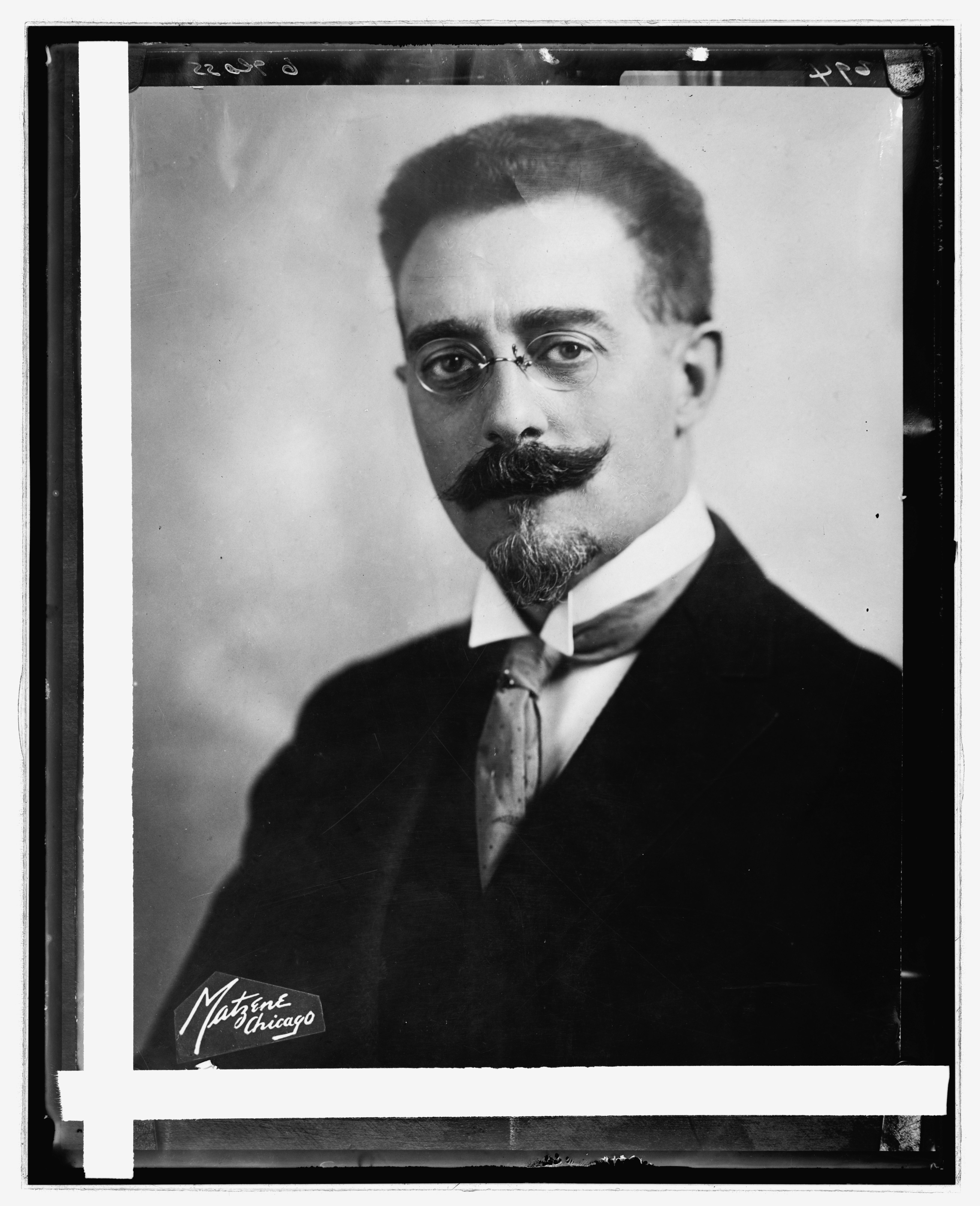
Picture of Borowski from 1910-1935.

== Life and career ==
Felix Borowski was of Polish descent but was born in the English village of Burton-in-Kendal, Westmorland. His father, who was quite a musician, was of distinguished Polish stock. His mother was English and very accomplished in music. His father gave him his first instruction on the piano as well as on the violin. He was educated in London at the Cologne Conservatory. After graduation he taught the piano and the violin for a while in Aberdeen, Scotland. At this time Borowski had begun to publish smaller compositions for piano and violin. Somewhat later his compositions won strong commendation from composers such as Edvard Grieg, Theodor Leschetizky, Sauer and other renowned masters.

In 1897, Borowski moved to the USA to become Director of the Chicago Musical College. During his working life in America he was a composer, teacher, and newspaper critic in Chicago. One of his pupils at the school was Gena Branscombe. He became president of the college from 1916–25. In 1937 he moved to Northwestern University, first as special lecturer in history and form, then as professor of musicology until 1942. He was the program annotator for the Chicago Symphony Orchestra from 1908-1956, and the CSO holds a collection of his original compositions as well as his arrangements of the works of other composers. In 1917, he was elected as an honorary member of Phi Mu Alpha Sinfonia music fraternity.

Borowski had two wives. He first married a former violin student, Edith Frances Grant of Aberdeen, Scotland in 1897, The couple had two children, named Olga and Leopold. Borowski and Grant remained together until Grant died in 1916. Borowski later married another violin student of his, Elsa Kanne of Peoria, in 1920. They lived happily in Chicago until Felix Borowski's death on Sept. 6, 1956.

== Compositions ==
Felix Borowski

Borowski created composition for violin, organ and orchestra, choir, chamber music, and more. One of his compositions for piano and violin ('Adoration') was recorded on Edison Blue Amberol in 1914 (#2475) by Richard Czerwonky (1886-1949), also an American musician of Polish descent, being an outstanding violin-player and orchestra conductor at his time. Borowski wrote three large-scale and romantic sonatas for the organ (published in 1904, 1906 and 1924). His compositions for orchestra include a poem Semiramis and 3 symphonies (c.1932, c.1933, c.1938). Borowski's late-romantic Piano Concerto in D minor was composed in 1913. (Note: The manuscripts of most of these orchestral works - for instance, scores and parts for symphonies 1 and 2, score for no.3 in G - are in the Fleisher Collection of the Free Library of Philadelphia. (The Newberry Library Borowski Papers contain recordings and analyses of a number of these works but not, it seems, scores or parts.)) He created three string quartets (published in 1897, 1928, and 1944)
