= George L. von Kolnitz =

American state legislator

George Frederick von Kolnitz was a lawyer, judge, and state legislator in South Carolina. He was born in Charleston, South Carolina on August 6, 1868 and died on December 27, 1948 in Mount Pleasant, South Carolina. He married Sarah Conover Holmes in Georgetown, South Carolina, on April 9, 1890. Fritz Von Kolnitz, a well-known South Carolinian sports figure, author, lawyer, and military officer, was his son. Helen von Kolnitz Hyer, the second Poet Laureate of South Carolina, was his daughter.

In 1908 he represented Charleston County in the South Carolina House of Representatives.

George F. von Kolnitz IV gave an oral history interview in 2009 on Hurricane Hugo.
