= Helen von Kolnitz Hyer =

American poet

- Born: Helen von Kolnitz; December 30, 1896; Charleston, South Carolina
- Died: November 14, 1983 (aged 86); Beaufort, South Carolina
- Education: Simmons College
- Occupations: Poet, writer
- Spouse: Edward Allen Hyer
- Children: 4
- Writing career
- Notable awards: South Carolina Poet Laureate

Helen von Kolnitz Hyer (December 30, 1896 – November 14, 1983) was an American poet. She was named by Governor John C. West as the second South Carolina Poet Laureate from 1974 to 1983.

== Early years and education ==
Hyer was born in Charleston, South Carolina on December 30, 1896. Her parents were George von Kolnitz and Sarah Conover (Holmes) von Kolnitz. She graduated from Ashley Hall in Charleston and then proceeded to study at Simmons College in Boston, Massachusetts, from 1917 to 1918, studying library science.

== Career ==
Hyer's poetry career began early in life as she was recognized for her ability to memorize and recite poetry. One of her poems became the school song for Ashley Hall. Publication of her poetry began when she was just 17; first in Romance magazine, then in Adventure Magazine.

Leaving college during World War I, Hyer made her way back to Charleston, becoming a statistician and subsequently was named Curator of Public Instruction at the Charleston Museum.

She was a founding member of the Poetry Society of South Carolina in 1920. Hyer wrote many works for children as well as adults. Her work often centered on the South, focusing on Confederate heroes, the history of South Carolina, as well as romance in the South. Her work appeared in journals such as Poet Lore, Argosy, and The Christian Science Monitor.

Hyer was named South Carolina's second poet laureate by Governor John West in April 1974. She served until her death in 1983.

== Personal life and legacy ==
She married Edward Allen Hyer in 1921. They had four daughters and one son. The couple lived in Michigan for many years, returning to Charleston in 1941.

Hyer died in Beaufort, South Carolina, on November 14, 1983. She was buried a Magnolia Cemetery in Charleston.

Composer Louise Cooper Spindle (1885-1968) set at least one of Hyer’s poems to music.

In 2003, composer Jim Clemens was commissioned to create a choral arrangement for the Georgetown Indigo Choral Society. He used lyrics from Hyer's poem "Santee Lullaby" in his first movement.

== Awards ==
- Poetry Society Prize for "Chat Île Plantation–Deserted" – Poetry Society of South Carolina, 1921.
- South Carolina Poet Laureate, 1974–1983

== Bibliography ==
- Santee Songs (1923)
- On Shiny Wings (1926)
- Hurricane Harbor (1927)
- The Magnificent Squeak (1929)
- Wine Dark Sea (1930)
- Stories By Seasons (1930)
- The Wimp and the Woodle, and Other Stories (1935)
- Danger Never Sleeps (1970)
- What the Wind Forgets a Woman's Heart Remembers (1975)
