= Louise Cooper Spindle =

American composer

May Louise Cooper Spindle (January 1, 1885 – October 1968) was an American composer and teacher who wrote many pedagogical pieces for piano.

Spindle was born in Muskegon, Michigan, to Rosina H. Winters and Charles Bicknell Cooper. She married Lee Addison Spindle in 1911.

Spindle began music lessons with her mother and later attended the Chicago Musical College. Her teachers included Felix Borowski, Glen Dillard, Laurence Powell, Hans von Schiller, Charles Vogan, and Max Wald. She socialized with composer Eleanor Everest Freer.

Spindle belonged to the American Society of Composers, Author, and Publishers (ASCAP), the Michigan Composers Club, and the Music Teachers National Association. In 1937, she was the Grand Rapids winner of the Michigan State Composers Contest. She taught at Columbia University.

Spindle's music was published by Bach Music Co./Harry Dellafield, Forster Music Publisher Inc., and Mills Music. In addition to pedagogical pieces for piano, her compositions included:

== Chamber ==
- Caprice Espagnole (violin and piano)

== Orchestra ==
- Southlands Suite

== Organ ==
- Prelude of Spring

== Piano ==
- Bouncy Balls
- Holiday in Naples
- Parade of the Bunnies
- Ping Pong
- Somersaults Rndoletto: Study in Crossing Hands and Staccato
- Swaying Pussywillows

== Vocal ==
- “April Wind”
- “Christmas Roundelay”
- City Eternal (cantata)
- “God’s Gift Supreme”
- Moon Magic (arranged for 2 or 3-part chorus)
- My Dream Ship (arranged for 2, 3, or 4-part chorus)
- Pickaninny Song (text by Helen Von Kolnitz Hyer; arranged for 2 or 3-part chorus) (E)
