= Pen & Pencil Club =

Journalisim club

- Formation: 1892
- Type: Social club
- Registration no.: 744519
- Location(s): 1522 Latimer Street; Philadelphia, Pennsylvania; United States
- Website: www.penandpencil.org

The Pen & Pencil Club is a private social club and association of journalists in Philadelphia. It is one of the oldest continuously operating press clubs in America, founded in 1892.

== History ==
It was founded in 1892 by reporters and editors at the city's seven morning and six evening newspapers by combining the Stylus Club, the Journalist Club of Philadelphia, and the Reporters Club. Under its bylaws, the club is controlled by the working press.

Over the years, the club has been at five locations. It is currently located at 1522 Latimer Street, approximately three blocks east of Rittenhouse Square in Center City.

The Pen & Pencil Club maintains a strict "off the record" policy on its premises. The club hosts a weekly lecture series called the Off-the-Record Sessions. Guest speakers have included governors, police commissioners, and the mayor of Philadelphia. On the last Thursday of the month, the Pen & Pencil Club hosts a poetry slam called "Slam, Bam, Thank You, Ma’am" in conjunction with the literary magazine Painted Bride Quarterly. The club has also hosted monthly wine tastings led by club president Brad Wilson.

According to its website, "The club has seen many well-known faces in its history. President William Howard Taft once engaged in bar banter at the P&P until 5 a.m., after giving his bodyguards the slip. George M. Cohan felt at home here. So did past members Red Smith and Damon Runyon."

== Notable members ==
- Stu Bykofsky
- Augustus Caesar Buell
- Damon Runyon
- Red Smith
- Ransford Dodsworth Bucknam
- Gardner Dozois

== See also ==
- List of American gentlemen's clubs
