= Place of Peace =

Jōdo Shinshū temple in South Carolina, US

- Hei-Sei-Ji (平清治)
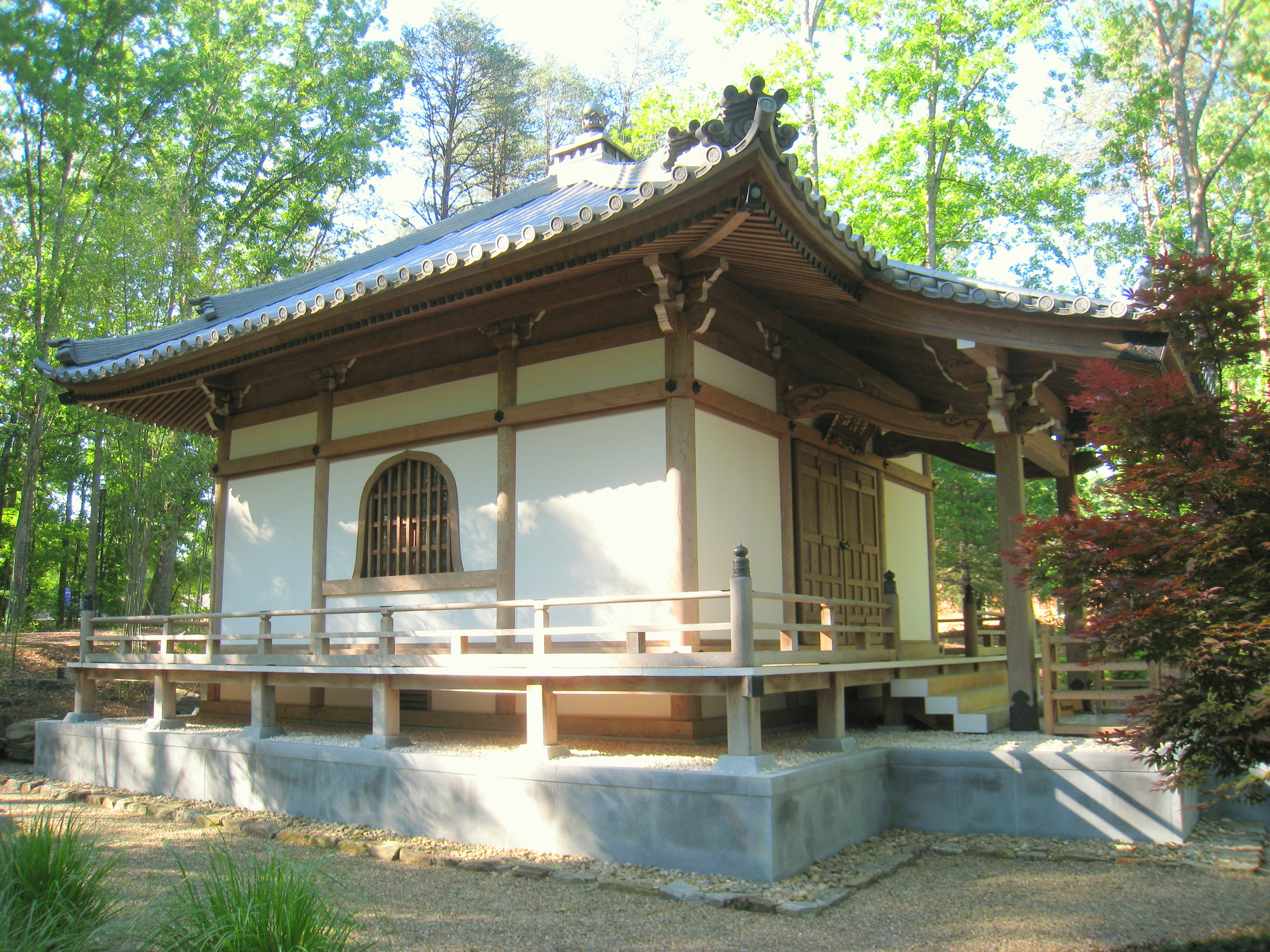

- Location in South Carolina

General information
- Type: Jōdo Shinshū (浄土真宗) temple
- Location: Furman University, Greenville, SC, USA
- Coordinates: 34.92816°N 82.43654°W

Website
- http://app2.furman.edu/web/placeofpeace/

The Place of Peace is a Japanese temple that was dismantled and reconstructed on the campus of Furman University in Greenville, South Carolina.

== Origins ==
The temple was donated to Furman University by Kiyohiro Tsuzuki and his wife, Chigusa. The Tsuzuki family has maintained residency in Nagoya, Japan and Greenville, South Carolina for many decades.

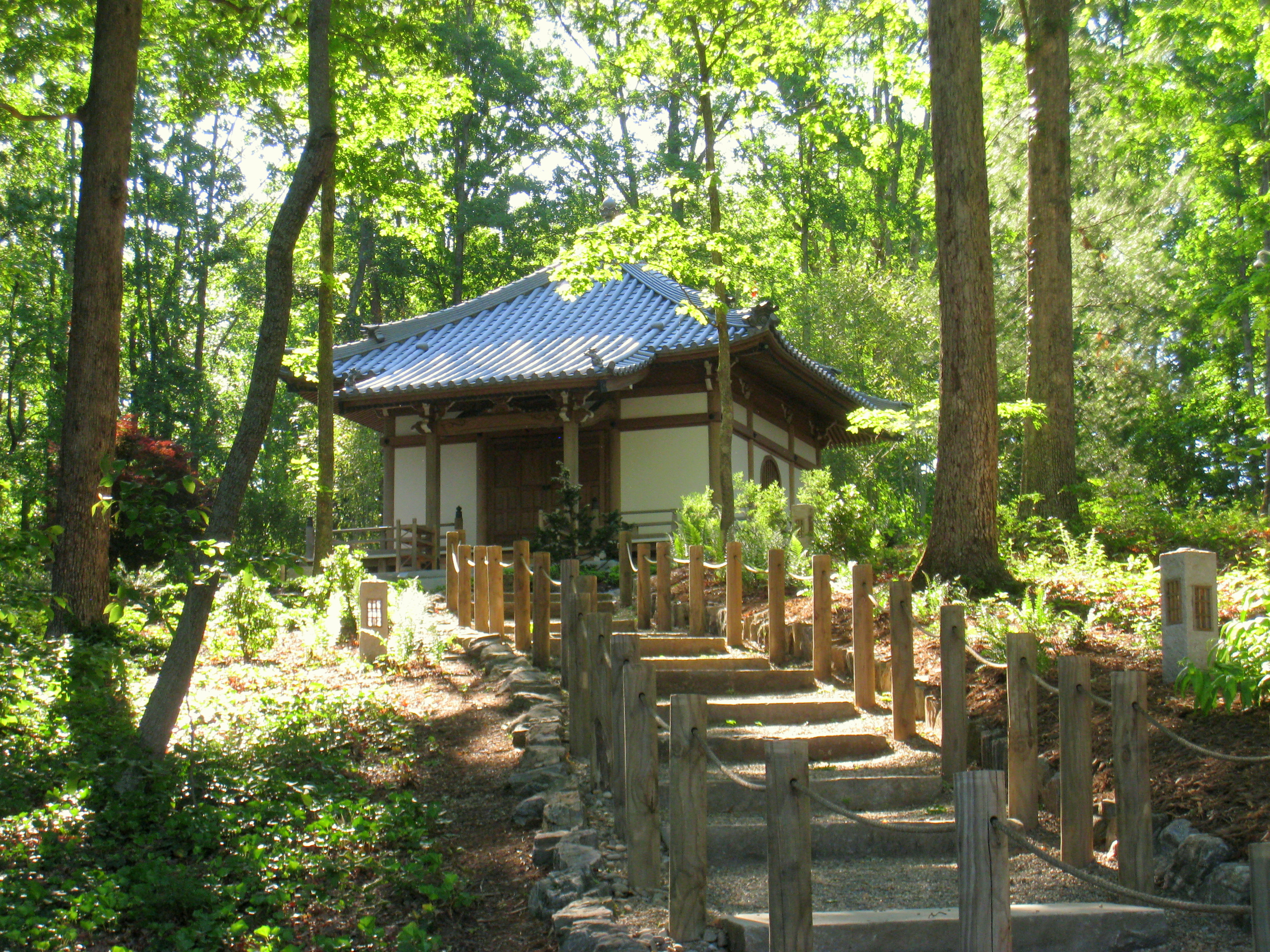
Place of Peace at Furman University

== Construction ==
This Jōdo Shinshū temple was built in Japan in 1984 by Daibun Co. and known as Hei-Sei-Ji (平清治) and Tsuzuki Hondo (都築 本堂). The temple is 900 square feet. However, the temple was never assigned a Buddhist priest to serve a practicing lay community. If this had been the case, then the temple would not have been removed from Japan.

In 2004 the Hei-Sei-Ji temple was dismantled into more than 2,400 pieces and shipped in four containers across the Pacific, through the Panama Canal and arrived in Charleston, South Carolina. The temple was renamed The Place of Peace at Furman and is a learning space to educate students and the public about oneness.

== Calligraphy ==
Hanging in the front of the meditation hall (shomen) is a calligraphy scroll of a poem written and brushed by Koichi Tohei. It reads, "信奉宇宙霊感応即現成." David Shaner translated the individual words of the poem as,

- 信奉 - shinpo - Blessed, Respectful
- 宇宙霊 - uchurei - Universal Spirit
- 感応 - kanno - Feeling, Reply
- 即 - soku - (particle indicating, "...whatever words come before it and whatever words come after it in the sentence mutually interpenetrate.)
- 現成 - genjo - To be present, to be in the "Now"

"Blessed Universal Spirit at this very moment I feel your presence."

== Dedication ==
On September 5, 2008, a dedication was presided over by David E. Shaner, assisted by Jim Eubanks, Abbot, Order of Pragmatic Buddhists. Among the guests were David Emory Shi, President of Furman University; Masanobu Yoshii, Acting Consul General of Japan; Masao Nakajima, President, Aichiken Construction; and Hiroshi Sato, Construction Supervisor.

== Major contributors ==
Major funding provided by Timothy F. Baiden, Bank of America, James E. and Malinda H. Eubanks, Japan World Exposition 70 Commemorative Fund, J. Michael '82 and Elizabeth K. Harley, The Norris Foundation, Margaret C. Robertson '33, Frank '61 and Susan E. Shaw, George W. Willis '48
