= Stu Bykofsky =

American journalist and columnist

- Born: Stuart Debs Bykofsky; New York City
- Education: Brooklyn College
- Occupation: Print journalist
- Employer: Philadelphia Daily News (1972-2019)
- Website: www.stubykofsky.com

Stu Bykofsky is an American journalist and was a columnist for the Philadelphia Daily News until 2019.

Bykofsky has been a columnist since 1987 and is one of the most widely read journalists in the city. Before accepting his role as a columnist, the native of New York City and Brooklyn College graduate was a theater and television critic, and also served as a copy editor and features writer. Bykofsky is a member of the Society of Professional Journalists, the National Society of Newspaper Columnists and Philadelphia's Pen & Pencil Club.

In 1991, Bykofsky created what would become his signature event, the Candidates Comedy Night during which candidates for political office would get onstage and try to win laughs. Those entertaining included candidates for mayor, U.S. Congress, U.S. Senate, judicial offices and governor among others. During the 25 years it existed, the event raised $500,000 for the Variety Club, the children's charity.

== "Another 9/11" comment ==
In August 2007, Bykofsky wrote a controversial article in which he declared that "one month from The Anniversary, I'm thinking another 9/11 would help America" to "quell the chattering of chipmunks and to restore America's righteous rage and singular purpose to prevail."

Reactions to this article were largely negative. Several commentators were offended that Bykofsky would suggest that more innocent Americans should die for the sake of national unity. However, Fox News host John Gibson agreed with Bykofsky and said, “I think it’s going to take a lot of dead people to wake America up.”

== Other work ==
Since 2011, he wrote columns to get an incarcerated murderer the sentence he had agreed to in a plea bargain but was denied. He also advocated for Philadelphia school children who excel in school to get VIP tickets to mayor's boxes. Bykofsky also wrote an expose of the city animal shelter that led to City Council hearings, removal of the management team and complete reform.

== Keith Olbermann hoax ==
In November 2010, Bykofsky attempted to contact Keith Olbermann for comment by emailing keith@keitholbermann.com. The responses, which came from someone at The Daily Caller, not from Olbermann, were attributed to Olbermann when published on the website Phawker.com; subsequently a retraction was printed.

== Associations ==
Bykofsky is a life member of the National Society of Newspaper Columnists and was the chair of its 2007 annual conference in Philadelphia. He is a long-time member of the Pen & Pencil Club and has held a variety of posts in Local 10 of the Newspaper Guild.
