= Ennis Rees =

American poet

- Born: Ennis Samuel Rees, Jr. March 17, 1925; Newport News, Virginia
- Died: March 24, 2009 (aged 84); Columbia, South Carolina
- Education: A.B., College of William & Mary, M.A., Ph.D. Harvard University
- Occupations: Poet, professor
- Spouse: Marion (Lott) Rees
- Children: 3
- Writing career
- Notable awards: South Carolina Poet Laureate

Ennis Samuel Rees Jr. (March 17, 1925 – March 24, 2009) was an American poet and professor. He was named by Governor Richard Wilson Riley as the third South Carolina Poet Laureate from 1984 to 1985.

== Biography ==
=== Early life and education ===
Rees was born in Newport News, Virginia, on March 17, 1925. His parents were Ennis Samuel Sr., and Dorothy Drumwright Rees. In high school, he participated in track and lettered in football, focusing more on athletics than academics. He was also student body vice president and his senior class vice president as well.

He graduated from the College of William & Mary with an A.B. degree in 1946 where he was Phi Beta Kappa and received the Botetourt Medal. He then went on to obtain both his M.A., in 1948, and Ph.D., in 1951, from Harvard University.

=== Career ===
After graduating from Harvard with his M.A. degree, Rees became an English instructor at Duke University in 1949 while still pursuing his Ph.D. from Harvard. He remained at Duke until 1952 when he became an instructor at Princeton University from 1952 to 1954. He then began a long career at the University of South Carolina in 1954, eventually becoming a full professor in 1963. He remained a professor at the university until his retirement in 1988.

=== Poet laureateship ===
Rees was named to be South Carolina's third poet laureate by Governor Dick Riley in 1984. Originally a life-time appointment, Riley changed the position some during his governorship and appointed Freeman to only a one-year term of office.

=== Personal life ===
Rees was married to the former Marion Lott. They had three children.

== Awards and honors ==
- South Carolina Poet Laureate – 1984
- South Carolina Academy of Authors honoree – 1999

== Works ==
In addition to his published books, some of Ennis' work has appeared in Journal of English, The Southern Review, The New Republic, and Germanic Philology.

=== Non-fiction ===
- The Tragedies of George Chapman: Renaissance Ethics in Action, Harvard University Press, 1954; Octagon Books, 1979, ISBN 9780374967673

=== Poetry ===
- Selected Poems University of South Carolina Press, 1973, ISBN 9780872492950

==== Children's verse ====
- The Song of Paul Bunyan and Tony Beaver (1964)
- Riddles, Riddles Everywhere (Abelard-Schuman, 1964)
- Pun Fun (Abelard-Schuman, 1965)
- Fables from Aesop (Oxford University Press, 1966)
- Windwagon Smith (1966)
- Tiny Tall Tales (1967)
- Teeny Tiny Duck and the Pretty Money (Prentice-Hall, 1967)
- Brer Rabbit and His Tricks (Young Scott Books, 1967)
- The Little Greek Alphabet Book (Prentice-Hall, 1968)
- More of Brer Rabbit's Tricks (1968)
- Gillygaloos and Gollywhoppers (1969)
- Potato Talk (1969)
- Fast Freddie Frog and other tongue-twister rhymes (Caroline House distributed by St. Martin's Press, 1993)

==== Translations ====
- Homer's The Odyssey (Random House, 1960)
- Homer's The Iliad (Random House, 1963)
