= South Carolina Poet Laureate =

Poet Laureate of South Carolina
- Incumbent; Marjory Heath Wentworth since 2003
- Type: Poet Laureate
- Appointer: Governor of South Carolina
- Term length: None
- Formation: 1934

The South Carolina Poet Laureate is the poet laureate for the state of South Carolina. As of October 2020, the position was vacant following the resignation of Marjory Heath Wentworth after 17 years in the post. No term of office is set by law. Laureates are appointed by the Governor of South Carolina.

== History ==
The position was created by a joint resolution of the South Carolina General Assembly in 1934. The term of office is not officially set, but generally it has been a life-time appointment. Governor Richard Wilson Riley changed this some during his term of office, limiting the laureateship to one-year terms.

== Responsibilities ==
The position was not given any clear, specific duties. The honorarium of the position was only $ 1,200 by 1984. However, this honorarium was cut by Governor Mark Sanford in 2003 when Wentworth agreed to serve without the pay.

== List of poets laureate ==
Prior to the official creation of the position in 1934, William Gilmore Simms had been often recognized as South Carolina's poet laureate.

The following is a list of official South Carolina poets laureate.

- Archibald Rutledge (1934–1973; appointed by Ibra Charles Blackwood)
- Helen von Kolnitz Hyer (1974–1983; appointed by John C. West)
- Ennis Rees (1984–1985; appointed by Richard Wilson Riley)
- Grace Beacham Freeman (1985–1986; appointed by Richard Wilson Riley)
- Bennie Lee Sinclair (1986–2000; appointed by Richard Wilson Riley)
- Marjory Heath Wentworth (2003–2020; appointed by Mark Sanford)

== See also ==
- Poet laureate
- List of U.S. state poets laureate
- United States Poet Laureate
