= Marjory Heath Wentworth =

American poet (born 1958)

- Born: Marjory Heath; June 3, 1958 (age 68); Lynn, Massachusetts
- Education: Mount Holyoke College, New York University
- Occupation: Poet
- Spouse: Peter
- Children: 3
- Writing career
- Notable awards: South Carolina Poet Laureate
- Website: www.marjorywentworth.net

Marjory Heath Wentworth (born June 3, 1958) is an American poet. She was named by Governor Mark Sanford as the sixth South Carolina Poet Laureate in 2003.

== Biography ==
=== Early life and education ===
Wentworth was born Marjory Heath on June 3, 1958, in Lynn, Massachusetts, and raised in nearby Swampscott. Her parents were John and Mary (Tully) Heath. As a child, she spent many years in and out of hospitals to correct some congenital organ anomalies. Adding further hardship was that her father, John, a purchasing agent for Parker Brothers, died of leukemia when she was just 14 years old.

She graduated from Mount Holyoke College (where she majored in anthropology, political science, and dance) and went on to receive her M.A. in Writing from New York University (NYU). While at NYU, she studied under Galway Kinnell, Phil Levine, Joseph Brodsky, and Carolyn Forché. After Mount Holyoke, she did some studies at Oxford University.

=== Career ===
While still a graduate student at New York University, Wentworth worked in refugee resettlement with the United Nations High Commission on Refugees. She went on after graduating to work as a book publicist with Readers International, a branch of Amnesty International, interviewing with Brodsky for the job.

After moving to South Carolina with her husband in 1989, Wentworth began teaching both children and adults in the area. In 1993, she started teaching as an adjunct instructor at Trident Technical College in North Charleston, South Carolina. For many years she has conducted the "Expressions of Healing" class at Roper Hospital in Charleston. The class focuses on those affected by cancer. She also teaches at the Charleston County School of the Arts and the creative writing class at The Art Institute of Charleston. She is also president of the Lowcountry Initiative for the Literary Arts.

Wentworth and her husband Peter run Wentworth PR which manages public relations for publishers and authors such as Dottie Frank, Mary Alice Monroe, and Gary Smith.

=== Poet laureateship ===
Wentworth read the inaugural poem at Mark Sanford's first inauguration as Governor of South Carolina. Shortly thereafter, in 2003, he appointed her as the sixth South Carolina Poet Laureate. Usually given a small honorarium ($1,200) as poet laureate, this honorarium was cut by Sanford in 2003 when Wentworth agreed to serve without the pay. As poet laureate, Wentworth is on the board of directors of The Poetry Society of South Carolina.

=== Personal life ===
She is married to filmmaker Peter Wentworth and they have three sons. They were introduced by her brother, Jack, and were married soon after graduating from college, on June 27, 1981. The Wentworth family moved to Sullivan's Island, South Carolina, and lived there for many years, beginning in 1989. Shortly after relocating, though, Hurricane Hugo hit the area hard and they were unable to live in their house for nearly a year. It was during that time that their third child was born. Later, the family moved to nearby Mount Pleasant in 2004.

Wentworth is a close friend of former South Carolina first lady Jenny Sanford.

== Awards and honors ==
- Pushcart Prize nominee several times.
- South Carolina Poet Laureate, 2003–present

== Works ==
Wentworth's poetry collections include:

- Nightjars: poems. Charleston, South Carolina: Laurel Publishing. 1995. p. 34. ISBN 978-0-9655612-0-4.
- what the water gives me. North Charleston, South Carolina: BookSurge. 2002. p. 84. ISBN 978-1-5910944-5-6. Art by Mary Edna Fraser
- Noticing Eden. Spartanburg, South Carolina: Hub City Writers Project. 2003. p. 83. ISBN 978-1-8918853-4-1.
- The Endless Repetition of an Ordinary Miracle : poems. Winston-Salem, North Carolina: Press 53. 2010. p. 73. ISBN 978-0-9825760-6-9.
- Despite Gravity. Greenville, South Carolina: Ninety-Six Press. 2007. p. 60. ISBN 978-0-9797995-0-1.

Other works include:

- Shackles. Charleston, South Carolina: LegacyPublications. 2008. p. 37. ISBN 978-0-9331010-6-7. Illustrated by Leslie Darwin Pratt-Thomas
- Méndez, Juan E.; Marjory Wentworth (2011). Taking a Stand: the evolution of human rights. New York, NY: Palgrave Macmillan. p. 246. ISBN 978-0-2301123-3-9.
