= Cassie Premo Steele =

American writer

- Born: April 13, 1967 (age 58) Detroit, Michigan, U.S.
- Occupation: Author; novelist; poet
- Education: University of Virginia; University of South Carolina (MA); Emory University (PhD)

Website
- www.cassiepremosteele.com

Cassie Premo Steele (born April 13, 1967, in Detroit, Michigan) is an American Pushcart-Prize nominated poet, novelist, and author. Steele is a contributor to HuffPost and Medium and from 2009 to 2015 she wrote a column for Literary Mama called "Birthing the Mother Writer". Her writing focuses on themes of intersectionality, ecofeminism, and collective trauma. From 2009 to 2013, she was the host of The Co-Creating Show podcast. In 2013, she was a TEDx speaker on "Writing as a Way of Calming, Centering and Making Meaning".

== Education ==
Steele attended the University of Virginia from 1985 to 1989, majoring in Comparative Literature and minoring in French and graduating Magna Cum Laude. She went on to earn an M.A. in Comparative Literature from the University of South Carolina in 1991 and then a Ph.D. in Comparative Literature and Women's, Gender, and Sexuality Studies from Emory University in Atlanta, Georgia, in 1996.

== Published works ==
=== Nonfiction ===
- Moon Days: Creative Writings about Menstruation. Summerhouse Press, 1999. Distributed by Ash Tree Publishing. ISBN 1-887714-40-5
- We Heal From Memory: Sexton, Lorde, Anzaldúa and the Poetry of Witness. Palgrave, 2000. ISBN 0-312-23342-6
- Easyhard: Reflections on the Practice of Creativity. WordClay, 2009. ISBN
- My Peace: A Year of Yoga at Amsa Studios. WordClay, 2008.
- Earth Joy Writing: creating balance through journaling and nature. Ashland Creek Press, 2015. ISBN 1-61822-034-9

=== Poetry ===
- Ruin. ISBN 1-932755-46-2
- New Women's Voices Series by Finishing Line Press, 2004. Released as a Kindle edition in 2013.
- This is How Honey Runs. Unbound Content, 2010. ISBN 1-936373-04-1
- The Pomegranate Papers. Unbound Content, 2012. ISBN 1-936373-26-2
- Wednesday. Unbound Content, 2013. ISBN 1-936373-40-8
- Beautiful Waters. Finishing Line Press, 2016.
- Tongues in Trees | Poems 1994–2017. Unbound Content, 2017. ISBN 1-936373-56-4
- In March We Fell in Love. samfiftyfour, 2020. ISBN 979-8693096677
- Anne Sexton and Ralph Waldo Emerson Ride a Donkey into Heaven. samfiftyfour, 2021. ISBN 979-8705240906
- Swimming in Gilead. Yellow Arrow Publishing, 2023 ISBN 979-8985070491

=== Fiction ===
- Shamrock and Lotus. All Things That Matter Press, 2010. ISBN 0-9846216-3-6
- The ReSisters. All Things That Matter Press, 2018. ISBN 1-73272-371-0
- Beaver Girl. Anxiety and Outcast Presses, 2023. ISBN 978-1960882066
