= Monsoon Mansion =

Autobiography by Cinelle Barnes

- First edition
- Author: Cinelle Barnes
- Genre: Memoir
- Publisher: Little A
- Publication date: 2018

Monsoon Mansion is a 2018 memoir by Cinelle Barnes, published by Little A. It discusses the author's childhood in the Philippines, including bouts of poverty and struggle after initially having an affluent life.

== Chronology ==
Barnes initially grew up in a wealthy family in the Manila metropolitan area; Her father derived his income from the petrochemical business, and he began dating their mother after their initial 1985 meeting. Beginning when Barnes was three years old, she and her family resided in the Mansion Royale, located in Antipolo. Barnes' family had servants.

The family's economic standing declined due to the 1991 Gulf War. The family converts the Mansion Royale into an events venue to generate revenue, but the father leaves the Philippines after a monsoon destroys the house. The mother gets into an abusive relationship with another man, Norman, who steals a student taxi business set up by Barnes and her brother Paolo. Norman joins a guerilla group, before Barnes leaves with her brother to live with her half sister.

== Background ==
Barnes had moved to New York after the events of the book; while in the latter period of her teenage years, she had been adopted by a person in her father's side of the family. She attended university in New York, where she met her future husband. She moved to the Southern United States after getting her degree, and gave birth to a daughter.

Barnes decided to write the memoir when she felt a comeback of her childhood memories during postpartum depression. Barnes's husband stated that she could write her memories down. She wrote her memories on a series of 3x5 notecards purchased by her husband, and she placed them in shoeboxes.

When she attended a master of fine arts (MFA) program at Converse College, her mentor suggested that she create a piece of writing based on information that she had not previously disclosed to another person. This prompted her to begin writing a book based on the notecards. She did additional research through interviewing her father and other family members and by consulting public records of court cases, births, and deaths, as well as queries on Google Earth. Her father suffered a stroke shortly after his interview.

Barnes's mentor submitted a draft of the work in secret, and the work was formally submitted to Little A in 2016. Barnes's literary agent told her to keep the work in consideration, citing the atmosphere in the aftermath of the 2016 U.S. presidential election, after Barnes's daughter went to the hospital the week of the submission and Barnes had thoughts of revoking the book's submission. Barnes recalled her agent stating "You cannot quit now. People need this kind of hope. People need something to tell them even when the world’s caving in, we’re going to be okay."

== Reception ==
Charmaine Chan of the South China Morning Post gave the book four of five stars. Chan stated that "This is a riches-to-rags memoir that holds your attention with its poetry, and will hopefully not be the last we hear from this accomplished writer."

Kirkus Reviews states that the book is "A lyrically heartfelt memoir of resilience in the face of significant obstacles."
