= The South Carolina Review =

- Discipline: Literary journal
- Language: English

Publication details
- History: 1968-present
- Publisher: Clemson University Press (United States)
- Frequency: Biannually

Standard abbreviations
- ISO 4: S. C. Rev.

Indexing
- ISSN: 0038-3163

Links
- Journal homepage

The South Carolina Review is a literary journal published by Clemson University. It was founded in 1968 as Furman Studies, edited by Professor Al Reid at Furman University and moved to Clemson in 1973, where it was initially co-edited by Richard J. Calhoun and Robert W. Hill. Early Managing editors were G. William Koon, Carol Johnston, and Frank Day.

The South Carolina Review has published work by Julian Bell, Stephen Dixon, Robert Parham, Iris Murdoch, Doris Betts, Walker Percy, Joyce Carol Oates, Cleanth Brooks, Kate Myers Hanson, Ruth Fairbanks, Marjorie Perloff, Jacob M. Appel, Mark Steadman, Robert Pinsky, Lewis Turco, James Dickey, Derek Walcott, Dede Wilson, Leslie A. Fielder, Donald Hall, Eudora Welty, George Palmer Garrett, Josephine Humphreys, George Will and Garrison Keillor.

== See also ==
- South Carolina literature
- List of literary magazines
