= Archibald Rutledge =

American writer

Archibald Hamilton Rutledge (1883–1973) was an American poet and educator, the first South Carolina poet laureate from 1934 to 1973. He wrote over 50 books and many poems, usually about his hunting and life experiences in South Carolina.

== Biography ==
Rutledge was born on October 23, 1883, in McClellanville, South Carolina. As a boy, Rutledge lived and hunted on Hampton Plantation with his father and brothers. His ancestors included John Rutledge, who was a governor of South Carolina as well as chief justice of the US Supreme Court and a signer of the US Constitution. He attended the Porter Military Academy, now the exclusive Porter-Gaud School, in Charleston, South Carolina. He then attended Union College where he was graduated in 1904 with Phi Beta Kappa honors and membership in Kappa Alpha Society. Later in life, he taught English at Mercersburg Academy in Pennsylvania. He was married and raised three sons. In the family tradition, he took them hunting back home in South Carolina and in the woods of the Appalachian hills, and his writings reflect this personal devotion to the hunting ethos.

His articles and poems appeared in Outdoor Life, Field and Stream, and dozens of other magazines. He wrote more than 50 books, including An American Hunter (1937), Old Plantation Days (1907) and Wild Life of the South (1935). Virtually all of his books, other than those devoted to poetry, comprised pieces that had previously appeared in magazines.

He was named the first South Carolina Poet Laureate in 1934. His poems often described his hunting and life experiences growing up on Hampton Plantation and the trips home to South Carolina in summer and for holidays.

Rutledge's prose places the reader in and part of the hunt. In "Quail of the Kalmias," he writes: "When Bell drew her point in the brown stubble, I thought it would be sport to walk right in, compelling myself to take the birds at a quartering shot as they passed me to escape into their mountain haunts. What they did always seemed to me about as adroit a maneuver as this crafty little aristocrat ever executes. They arose in two small groups, one led by the old cock and the other by the old hen. There was a difference in intelligence, though not in the size of the birds. Separated by only a few yards, the two groups came hurtling by on either side of me, in strong, low level flight."

In 1941, he received an honorary degree in Doctor of Letters from Oglethorpe University.

Rutledge died on September 15, 1973, at age 90, of natural causes. He is buried at Hampton Plantation.

== Selected works ==
- The Heart's Quest
- Under the Pines
- The Banners of the Coast
- Spirit of Mercersburg
- Old Plantation Days
- Plantation Game Trails
- South of Richmond
- Days Off in Dixie
- Heart of the South
- A Monarch of the Sky
- Children of Swamp and Wood
- Life's Extras
- Bolio and Other Dogs
- The Flower of Hope
- Peace in the Heart
- Veiled Eros
- When Boys go off to School
- Wild Life of the South
- Brimming Chalice
- An American Hunter
- My Colonel and His Lady
- It Will be Daybreak Soon
- The Sonnets of Archibald Rutledge
- Rain on the Marsh
- Christ is God
- Home by the River
- Love's Meaning
- Hunter's Choice
- The Beauty of Night
- God's Children
- The Angel Standing
- The Everylasting Light and other Poems
- A Wildwood Tale
- Beauty in the Heart
- The Heart's Citidel and other Poems
- Brimming Tide and other Poems
- Those Were The Days
- From the Hills to the Sea

== Legacy ==
- Archibald Rutledge Academy in McClellanville, South Carolina, was named in his honor.
- Image: Archibald Rutledge Portrait at the South Carolina State House
