= Furman University =

Private university in Greenville, South Carolina, US

Coordinates: 34°55′33″N 82°26′8″W

- Former names: Furman Academy and Theological Institution (1826–1829); Furman Theological Institution (1829–1834); Furman Institution (1837–1851)
- Motto: Christo et Doctrinae
- Motto in English: For Christ and Learning
- Type: Private liberal arts university
- Established: 1826; 200 years ago
- Academic affiliations: ACS; CIC; NAICU; Annapolis Group; Oberlin Group
- Endowment: $885.5 million (2025) (Beneficiary of the Duke Endowment, 1924)
- President: Elizabeth Davis
- Faculty: 321
- Undergraduates: 2,283 (fall 2022)
- Postgraduates: 160 (fall 2022)
- Location: Greenville, South Carolina, U.S.
- Campus: 750 acres (300 ha); Suburban
- Colors: Purple & white
- Nickname: Paladins
- Mascot: Paladin
- Website: www.furman.edu

Furman University is a private university in Greenville, South Carolina, United States. Founded in 1826 and named after Baptist pastor Richard Furman, the liberal arts university is the oldest private institution of higher learning in South Carolina. It became a secular university in 1992, while keeping Christo et Doctrinae (For Christ and Learning) as its motto. As of Fall 2021, it enrolls approximately 2,300 undergraduate students and 150 graduate students on its 750-acre (304 ha) campus.

== History ==
=== Beginnings (19th century) ===
Furman Academy and Theological Institution was established by the South Carolina Baptist Convention and incorporated in December 1825 in Edgefield. With 10 students, it held its first classes January 15, 1828; (Note: "Furman University" in The New Encyclopedia of Southern Culture, (Volume 17: Education), Clarence L. Mohr, ed. (UNC Press Books, 2011) p221) although another source says it opened in January 1827. Through 1850, average enrollment was 10 students, and it was at constant risk of insolvency. From 1829 to 1834, it operated in the High Hills of the Santee (now Stateburg, South Carolina). Furman closed from 1834 to 1837. When the school reopened, at the urging of the Reverend Jonathan Davis, chairman of the Board of Agents, the school moved to his native Fairfield County, near Winnsboro.

In 1850, the state legislature chartered Furman University. It was not until 1851 that South Carolina Baptists were able to raise the necessary funds for the removal of the school to Greenville, South Carolina.

The university closed from 1861 to 1866, when "most students and several faculty members enlisted in the Confederate forces."

The Furman Institution Faculty Residence serves as a visible reminder of the early history of Furman University and its brief establishment in Fairfield County.

=== Growth and expansion (20th century) ===
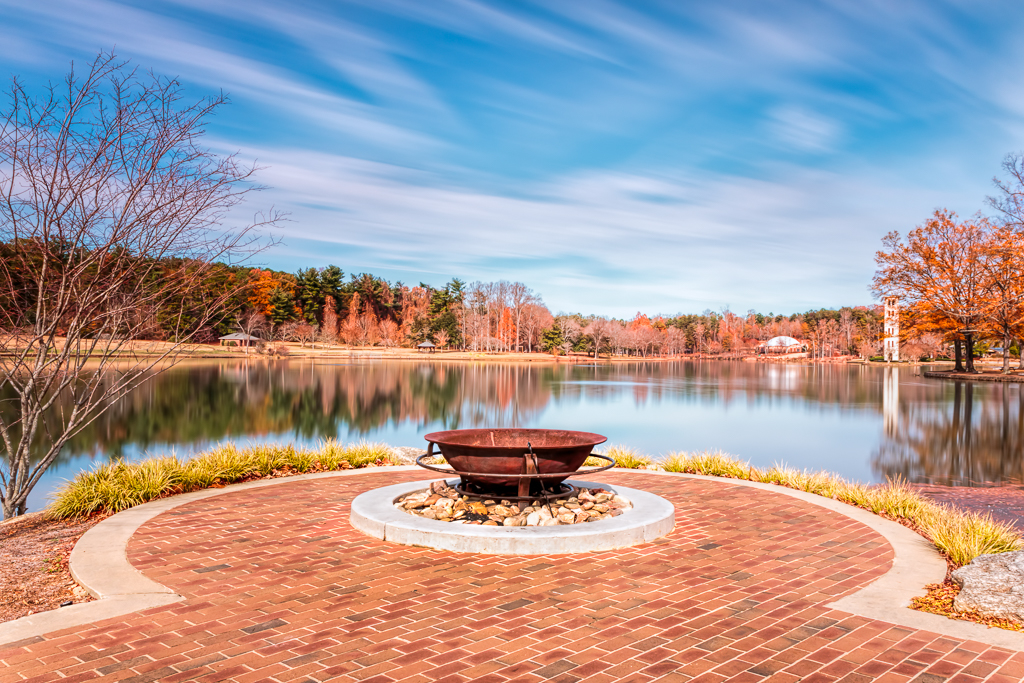
Furman University has been in its current location since 1958. The Furman Lake and Bell Tower (background; right) are prominent elements of the campus.

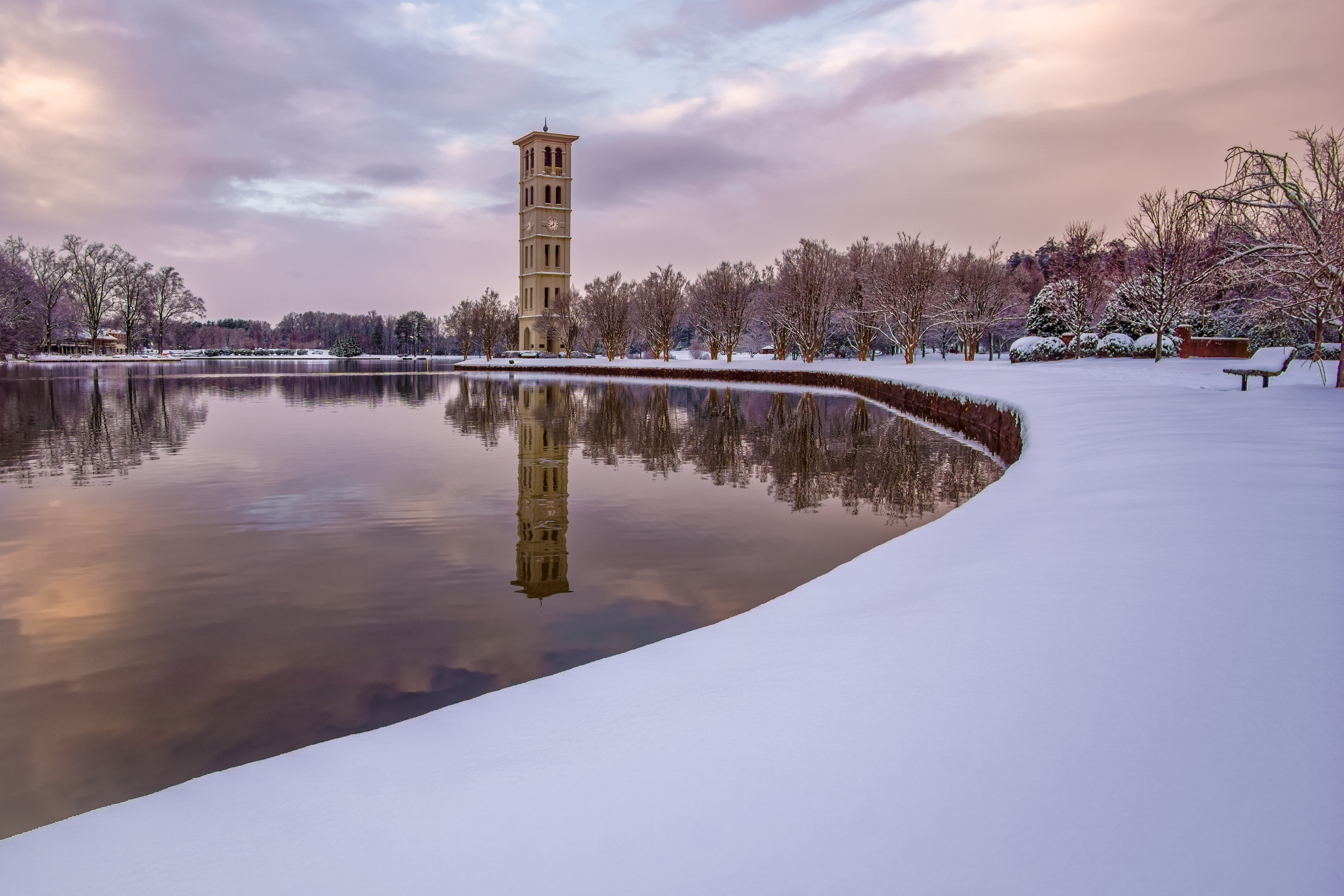
Located in Upstate South Carolina, Furman University often gets snow in the winter, as seen in 2016.

The first school building from the downtown Greenville campus was transported to the current campus, where it still stands. In 1933, students from the Greenville Women's College began attending classes with Furman students. Shortly thereafter, the two schools merged to form the present institution.

In 1924, Furman was named one of four collegiate beneficiaries of the Duke Endowment. Through 2007, Furman has received $110 million from the endowment, which is now one of the nation's largest philanthropic foundations. Three other colleges—Duke, Davidson and Johnson C. Smith—also receive annual support and special grants from the endowment.

In 1954, Brown v. Board of Education found the "separate but equal" policy to be unconstitutional, starting the lengthy process of desegregating public schools. As of that date, Furman, like most Southern colleges, did not accept African Americans as students. Some Furman students began to press for change. In 1955, some students wrote short stories and poems in The Echo, a student literary magazine, in support of integration; school administrators destroyed all 1,500 printed copies. In 1953, Furman began construction on its new campus, (Note: Furman University: Our History. https://www.furman.edu/about-furman/history/) five miles (8 km) north of downtown Greenville. Classes on the new campus began in 1958.

By 1963, enough faculty were siding with the students over racial desegregation that Furman's board of trustees voted to admit Black students. Action on the trustees' decision was postponed and it was later overturned by South Carolina's Baptist Convention; desegregated admission was not implemented at Furman until its incoming president, Gordon W. Blackwell, a past president of Florida State University, made it a condition of his acceptance of the new position. In 1965, Joseph Vaughn was the first black undergraduate to enroll.

In 1992, the South Carolina Baptist Convention ended its affiliation with Furman. Furman's "heritage is rooted in the non-creedal, free church Baptist tradition which has always valued particular religious commitments while insisting not only on the freedom of the individual to believe as he or she sees fit but also on respect for a diversity of religious perspectives, including the perspective of the non-religious person."

=== 21st century ===
In 2012, a new facility, named for alumni Sarah and Gordon Herring, was built for continuing education. The student center was expanded and renovated in 2012. David Trone, a Furman alumnus, together with his wife June, participated through a $3.5 million gift resulting in the center being named the Trone Student Center.

In October 2018, the Task Force on Slavery and Justice set up by Provost George Shields issued Seeking Abraham, a report making recommendations "to acknowledge the role slavery and racism had in the school's history." The task force was a response to the article, "Slavery, Memory and Reconciliation: What is the Furman Legacy?" published in October 2016 in the university newspaper, which pointed out that Richard Furman, the university's namesake, and even more so his son James Clement Furman, Furman's first president, were slave owners and active defenders of slavery. "Abraham" is a reference to Abraham Sims, a slave at the house of James Furman. The task force issued 19 recommendations, which were unanimously accepted by Furman's board of trustees. James C. Furman Hall was renamed Furman Hall, and a statue was erected to honor Joseph Vaughn, "the first Black student to attend the school".

== Campus ==
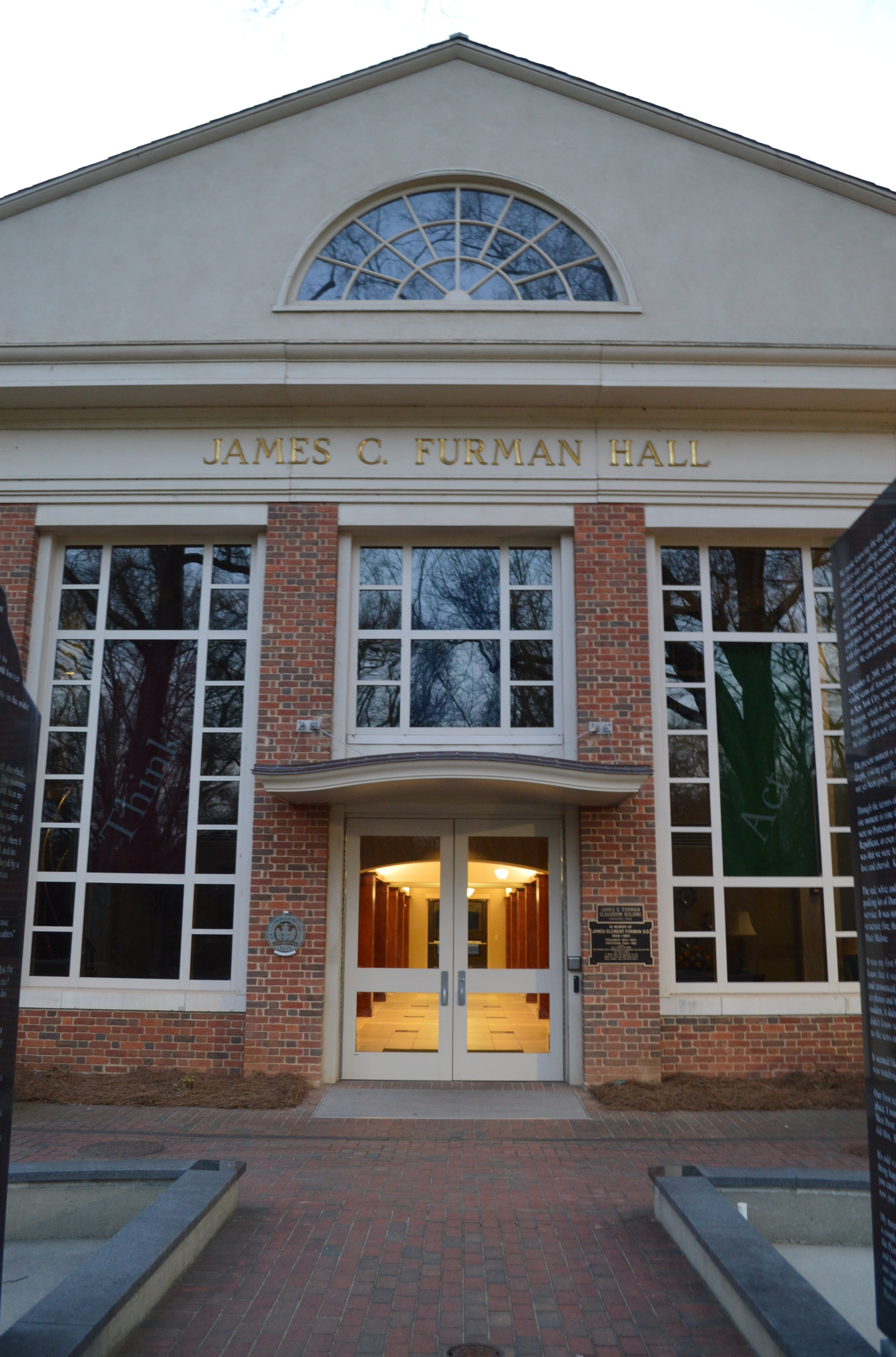
The Furman Hall is centrally located on campus.

Furman University's campus is located at the foothills of the Blue Ridge Mountains in the upstate region of South Carolina.

Furman's campus has been named one of the most beautiful campuses in the nation. In 2016, USA Today named Furman's campus as the 4th most beautiful campus out of 10. Times Higher Education named it ninth out of the ten most beautiful campuses in the nation in 2017. In 2019, Travel + Leisure listed Furman as 23rd out of 25 of the most beautiful college campuses in the United States.

=== Timmons Arena ===
Timmons Arena is a 4,000-seat multi-purpose arena. (Note: Official Site; Timmons Arena) It is home to the Furman University Paladins basketball team since its opening on December 30, 1997. (Note: Timmons Arena - FurmanPaladins.com) Timmons Arena received a $40 million donor funded renovation in 2025.

=== Cliffs Cottage ===
A Southern Living showcase home called Cliffs Cottage opened in 2008. The building is solar-powered using two panels, and features geothermal heating. Cliffs Cottage was the first sustainable showcase home for Southern Living magazine, which featured it in the article Our Most Innovative House Ever, detailing how to create a house that requires less energy and generates power.

=== Place of Peace and Asian garden ===
The campus also includes an Asian garden, the centerpiece of which is the Place of Peace, a Buddhist temple moved to the site from Japan. A replica of the cabin that Henry David Thoreau inhabited while writing On Walden Pond is located on the west side of the lake.

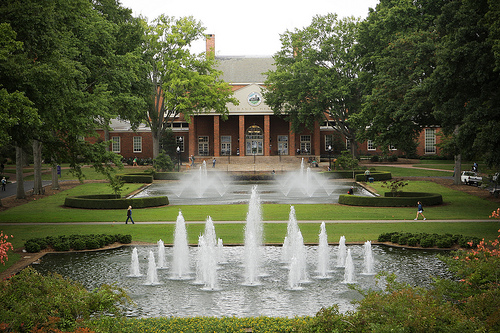
James B. Duke Library

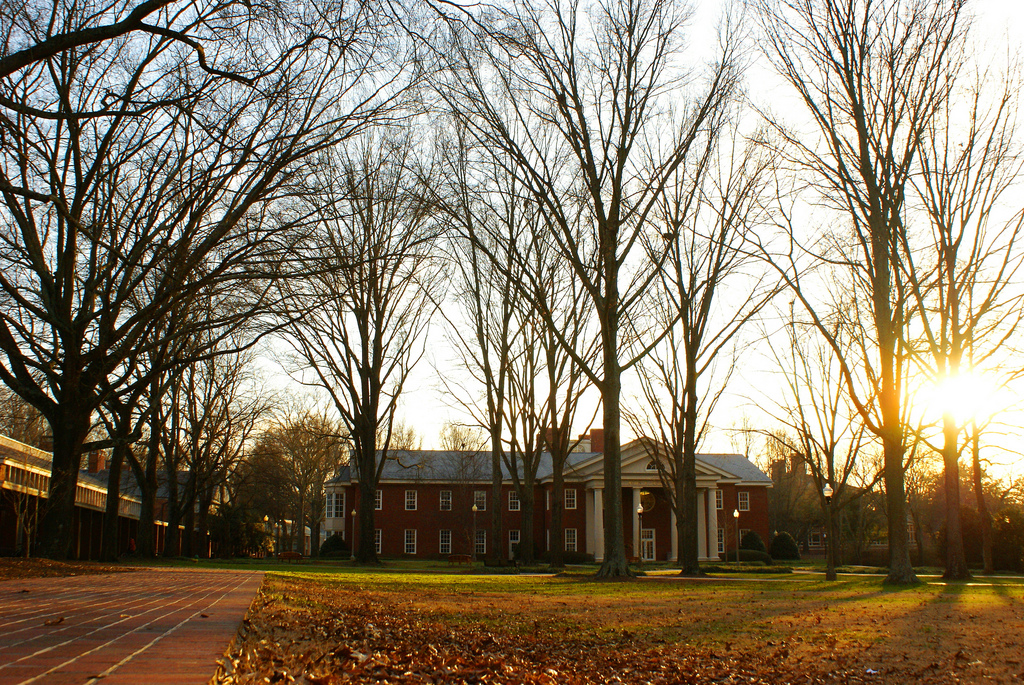
John E. Johns Hall

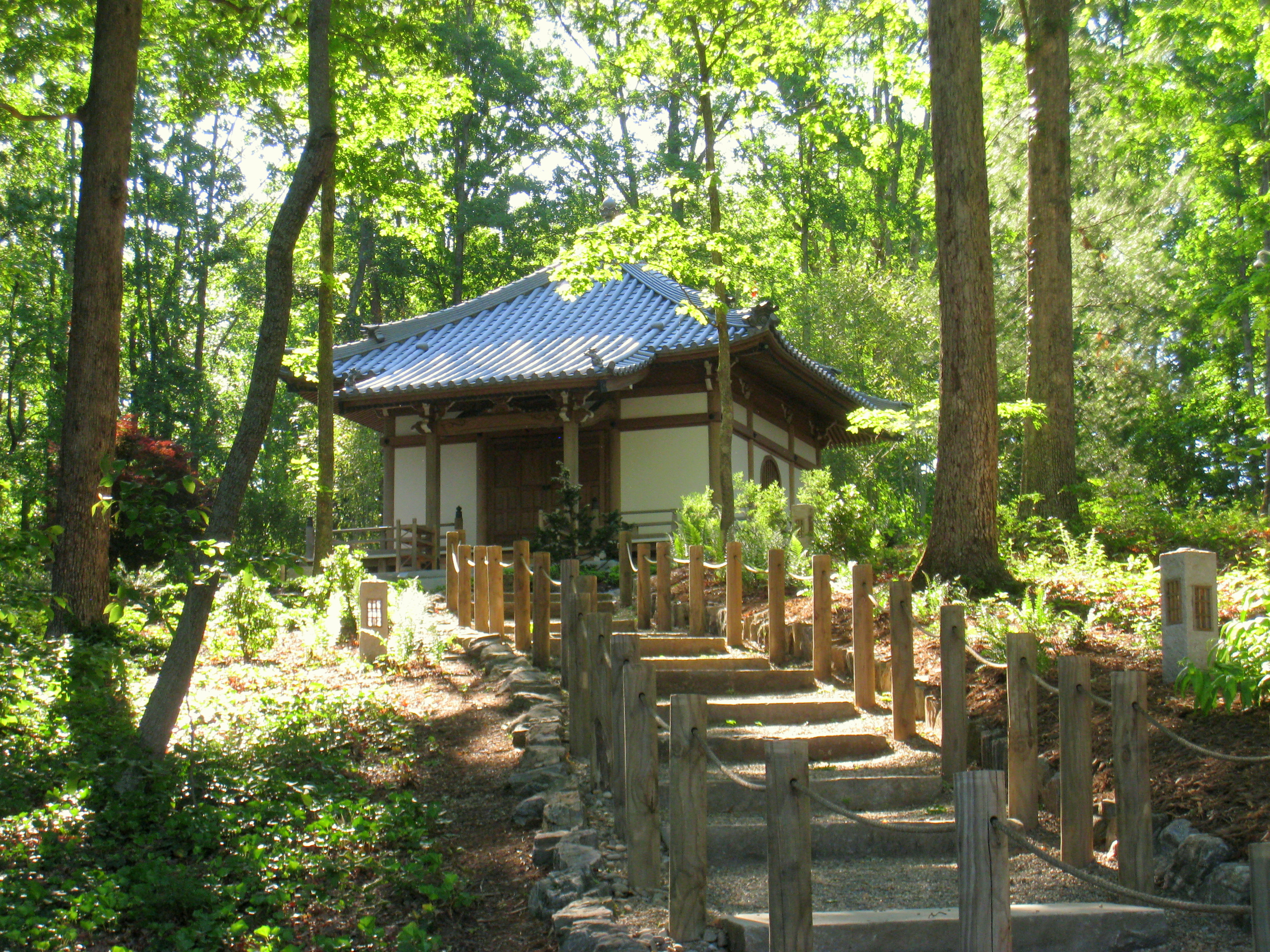
Place of Peace

=== Environmental sustainability ===
Furman works to conserve, reduce, and recycle on campus, has constructed green buildings and provided students with alternative transportation. Furman has a farm on campus. The Furman Farm is a quarter-acre garden located beside the Cliffs Cottage and the Furman Lake. A wide variety of produce is grown throughout the year using sustainable agricultural practices such as crop rotations, composting, drip lines, natural fertilizers, and integrated pest management. Furman also has installed a 6-acre solar farm with a 743 kW solar photovoltaic (PV) array near the campus entrance. The university hopes to achieve carbon neutrality by 2026.

The Princeton Review featured Furman in its 2023 list of 455 Green Colleges; it received a green rating of 90, within a possible range of 60-99 . In. 2015, the Sierra Club included Furman in its list of the top 50 eco-friendly universities in America. Furman received a grade of "A−" from the Sustainable Endowments Institute on its College Sustainability Report Card in 2011 along with 52 other institutions. Furman takes part in the voluntary self-reporting Sustainability Tracking Assessment Ratings System (STARS), in which it received a gold rating in 2021.

== Organization and administration ==
University presidents
President	Years
James Clement Furman	1859–1879
Charles Manly	1881–1897
Andrew Philip Montague	1897–1902
Charles Hallette Judson	1902–1903 (acting)
Edwin McNeill Poteat	1903–1918
Sidney Ernest Bradshaw	1918–1919 (acting)
William Joseph McGlothlin	1919–1933
Bennette Eugene Geer	1933–1938
Robert Norman Daniel	1938 (acting)
John Laney Plyler	1939–1964
Gordon Williams Blackwell	1965–1976
John Edwin Johns	1976–1994
David Emory Shi	1994–2010
Rodney Alan Smolla	2010–2013
Carl F. Kohrt	2013–2014 (interim)
Elizabeth Davis	2014–present

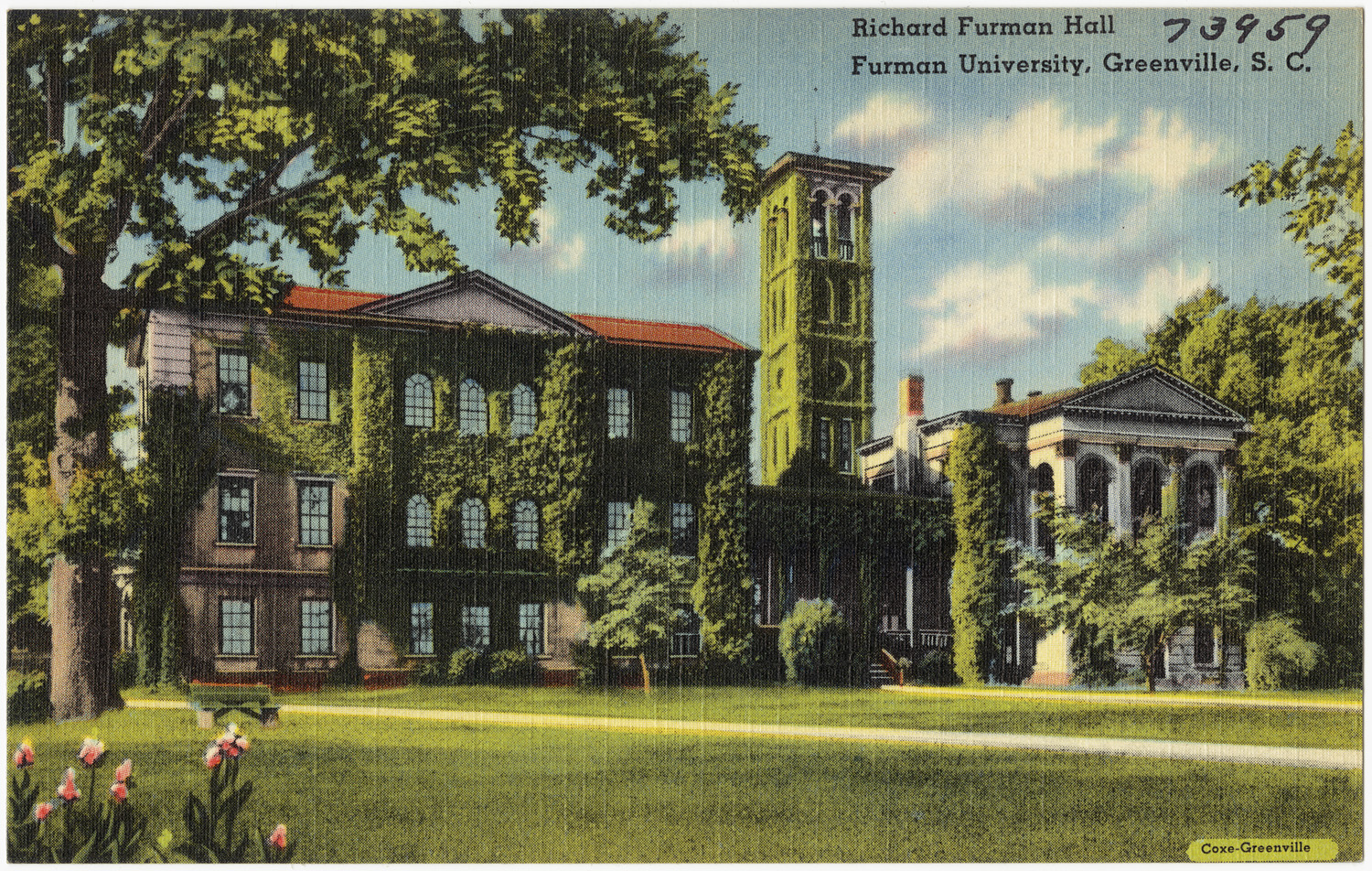
The old campus of Furman University, prior to its relocation under the presidency of John Laney Plyler

Leadership and guidance to the university is provided by a board of trustees, whose 36 members meet at least three times per academic year and can be elected for up to four three-year terms. Former board members may be designated as 'Trustees Emeriti'. These include former Governor and U.S. secretary of education Richard Riley. (Note: Trustees Emeriti. http://www.furman.edu/about-furman/university-leadership/board-of-trustees/trustees-emeriti/) As of 2023, current board members include David Trone, U.S. representative for Maryland's 6th congressional district, and William Byrd Traxler Jr., Senior Judge of the United States Court of Appeals. (Note: Board Members. https://www.furman.edu/about-furman/university-leadership/board-of-trustees/board-members/.) Board members also come from private companies

Under the governance of the board of trustees, Furman is led by a president. Elizabeth Davis became Furman's president on July 1, 2014. She is the 12th president of the institution, or 16th when also counting interim presidents. As of 2023 eleven senior administrators manage academic and administrative departments. These administrators are composed of a provost, a dean of faculty, and nine other members. (Note: Senior Administrators. https://www.furman.edu/about-furman/university-leadership/senior-administrators/)

== Academics ==
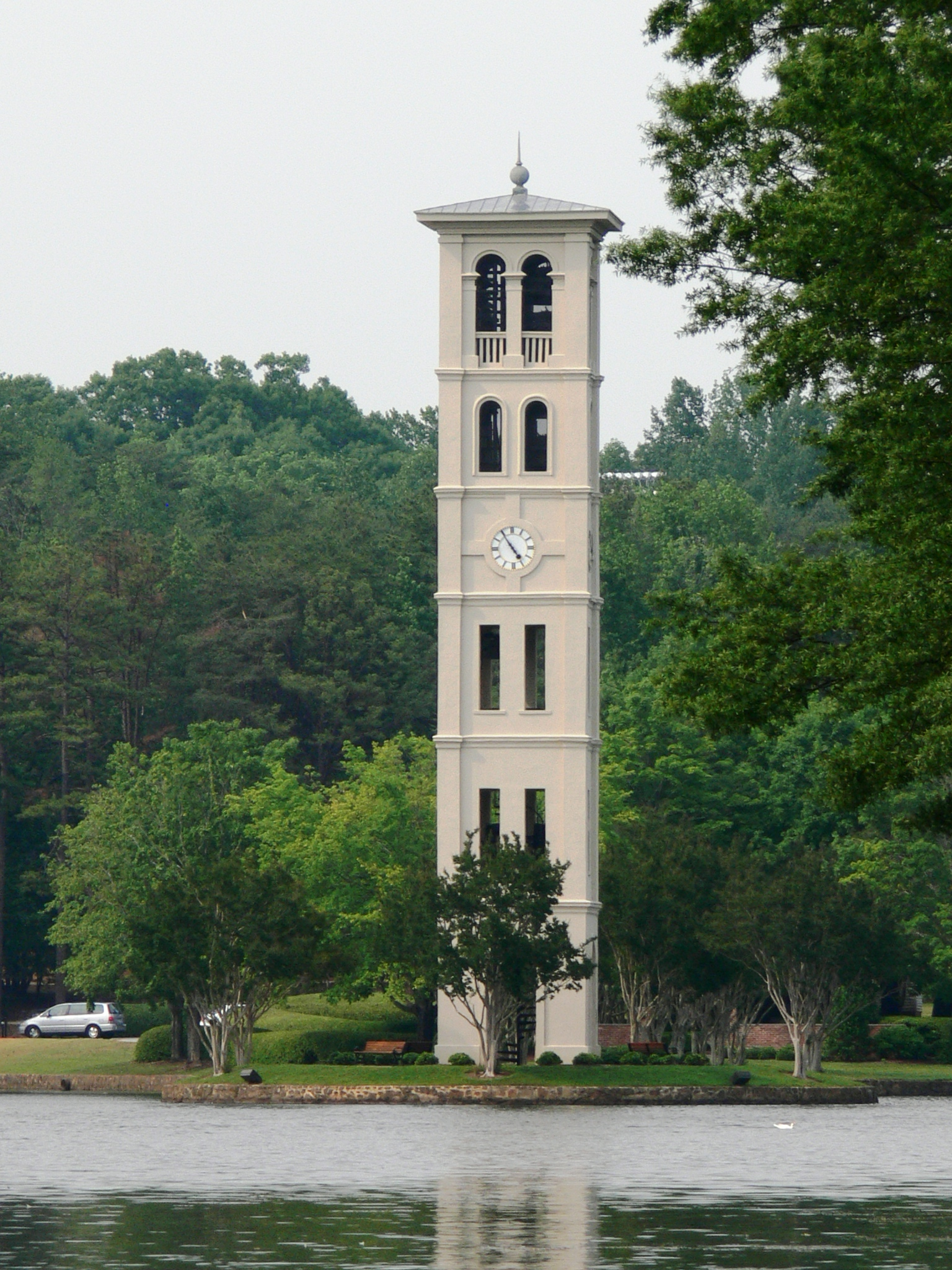
The Bell Tower, an icon of the university

Furman offers majors and programs in 42 subjects. All students must complete general education requirements as part of the liberal arts curriculum, which include mind and body wellness, textual analysis, two natural sciences, math/formal reasoning, two empirical studies of human behavior, history, ultimate question, foreign language, and world culture. Furman is not divided into colleges, but includes centers and four institutes. Furman's four institutes are the Shi Institute for Sustainable Communities, the Richard W. Riley Institute, the Institute for the Advancement of Community Health, and the Hill Institute for Innovation and Entrepreneurship. Based on the number of 2024 graduates, the university's most popular undergraduate programs included:

- Exercise Science and Kinesiology (55)
- Political Science and Government (43)
- Business Administration and Management (38)
- Psychology (37)
- Biology/Biological Sciences (36)
- Speech Communication and Rhetoric (34)

Furman has produced 20 Truman Scholars, as well as several Rhodes scholars and recipients of Goldwater, Fulbright and National Science Foundation Awards.

=== Reputation and rankings ===
Academic rankings

Liberal arts
- U.S. News & World Report: 45 (tie) of 211
- Washington Monthly: 68 of 194

National
- Forbes: 149 of 500
- WSJ/College Pulse: 271 of 500

In 2025, Furman was ranked tied for 45th out of 211 in U.S. News & World Report's 2023 National Liberal Arts Colleges rankings

As of 2023, Furman is also featured in The Princeton Review's "Best 378 Colleges" list and was named as one of 143 "Best Southeastern Colleges" The Princeton Review also ranked Furman in 5th place on its list of universities committed to national service in 2016.

In 2019, Furman University was ranked 21st in a list of the top 25 colleges and universities in the South by Forbes.

Furman ranked 23rd among all liberal arts colleges in number of graduates who went on to receive PhDs from 1990 to 1995. Furman ranked 76th among all universities in the nation of graduates that went on to receive PhDs from 2008 to 2017.

== Student life ==
The Division of Student Life at Furman oversees numerous program, activities, and organizations for students on campus. Furman has thirteen fraternities and sororities, which occupy residence halls instead of chapter houses. Approximately 34 percent of the student body belongs to a fraternity or sorority. The Quaternion Senior Order, or QSO, is a senior society that is "generally considered to be the highest honor" for a Furman student and comes with a key to the Old College.

== Athletics ==
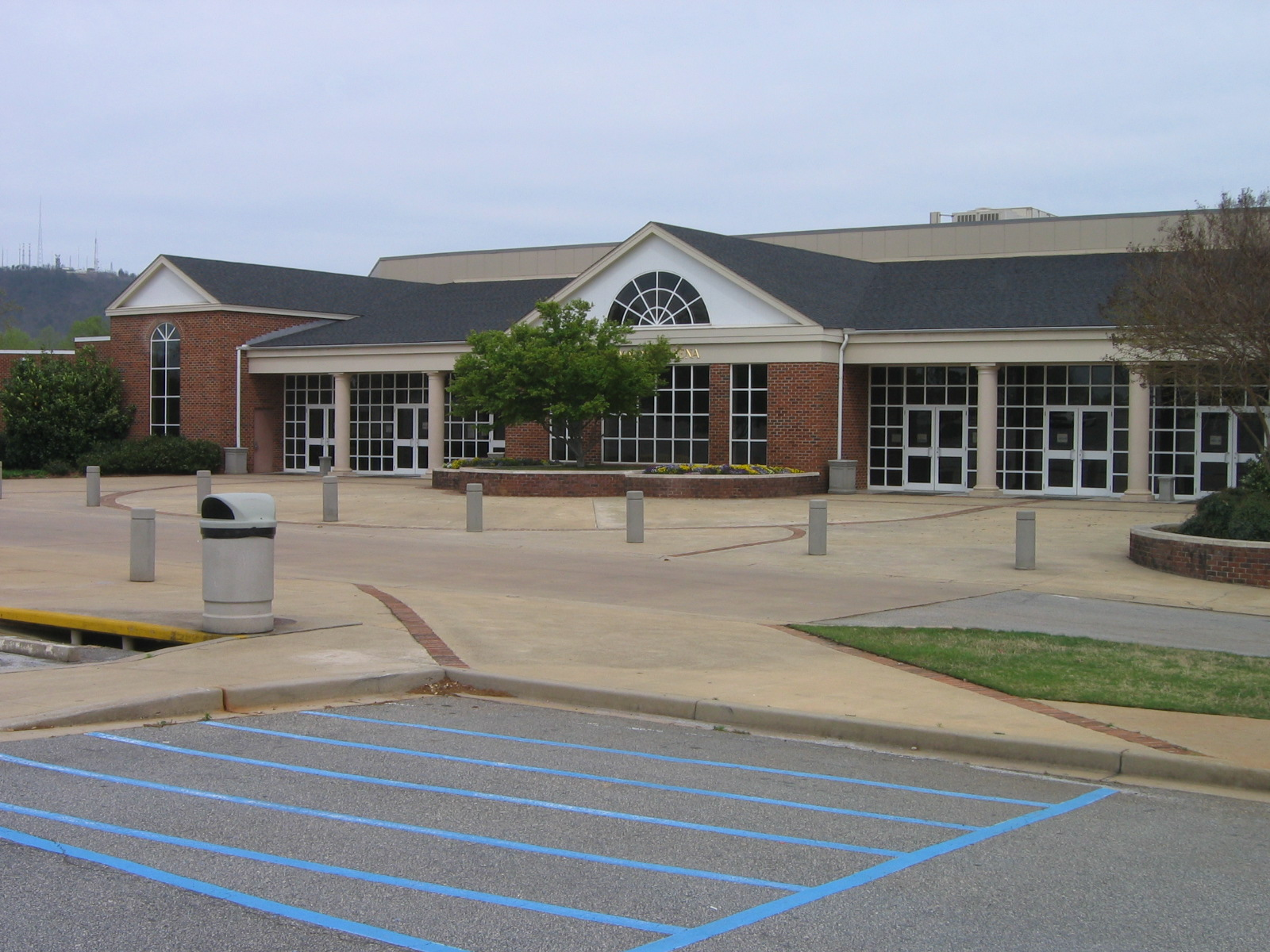
The Timmons Arena

Furman competes in NCAA Division I athletics, and at the FCS (Football Championship Subdivision) level in football. Furman fields seven men's teams and nine women's teams, as well as 16 club sports and many intramural teams. The university is a member of the Southern Conference.

In 2018, Furman was placed 73rd out of 291 colleges in the NACDA Directors' Cup Division I Final Standings, highest among Southern Conference members. In the 2019–2020 season, Furman finished in 32nd place out of 157 institutions in the NACDA Director's Cup Final Fall Standings.

== Notable people ==
=== Notable alumni ===
- Julia Adams (born 2001), professional tennis player
- Eleanor Beardsley, bilingual journalist and foreign correspondent
- Robert Blocker, dean of the Yale School of Music
- Ben Browder, actor, writer and director
- Tomiko Brown-Nagin, legal historian, former dean at Harvard University
- Allie Buchalski, professional distance runner
- Judy Clarke, criminal defense attorney
- Brad Cox, computer scientist, creator of the Objective-C programming language
- James L. Crenshaw, biblical scholar
- Stephen Crotts, Presbyterian Reverend and Author
- Thomas T. Cullen, United States District Judge for the Western District of Virginia
- Rudy Currence, Grammy-nominated gospel singer
- Beth Daniel, professional golfer
- Clint Dempsey, professional soccer player
- Brad Faxon, professional golfer
- David C. Garrett Jr., businessman, CEO of Delta Air Lines
- Thomas T. Goldsmith Jr., television pioneer, the co-inventor of the first arcade game to use a cathode-ray tube
- Amy Grant, Six-Time Grammy Award-winning contemporary Christian/pop artist
- Jamie Lee Henry, first openly transgender officer in the United States Armed Forces
- Jay Jackson, Major League Baseball pitcher
- Victoria Jackson, actress and comedian
- Ryan Ken, screenwriter
- Herman W. Lay, founder of Frito-Lay potato chips
- Keith Lockhart, music director and conductor
- Jordan Loyd (born 1993), professional basketball player
- John Michael McDonnell, Admiral, Director of the National Security Agency, and Director of National Intelligence in George W. Bush's administration
- Julie McElrath, HIV immunology and vaccine researcher
- John F. Mulholland Jr., former CIA associate director and retired lieutenant general in the United States Army
- Billy Napier, college football head coach
- Robert G. Owens Jr., U.S. Marine Corps major general and flying ace
- Richard Riley, 6th United States Secretary of Education and former governor of South Carolina
- Bear Rinehart, musician
- Joshua Rudd, General, Director of the National Security Agency and Commander of US Cyber Command
- Mark Sanford, politician, former governor of South Carolina and former U.S. Representative for South Carolina's 1st district
- John E. Sloan, US Army major general, attended as a member of the class of 1907
- Alexander Stubb, 13th president of Finland, 2024–, 43rd prime minister of Finland, 2014–15, Minister of Finance, 2015–16
- Allie Beth Stuckey, podcast host, blogger, and conservative commentator
- Charles H Townes, physicist, 1964 Nobel Prize winner in physics
- Letitia H. Verdin, Associate Justice of the South Carolina Supreme Court
- John B. Watson, psychologist, founder of Behaviorism
- Xavier Woods, professional wrestler and YouTube personality
- Sam Wyche, professional football coach
- Walker Zimmerman, professional soccer player
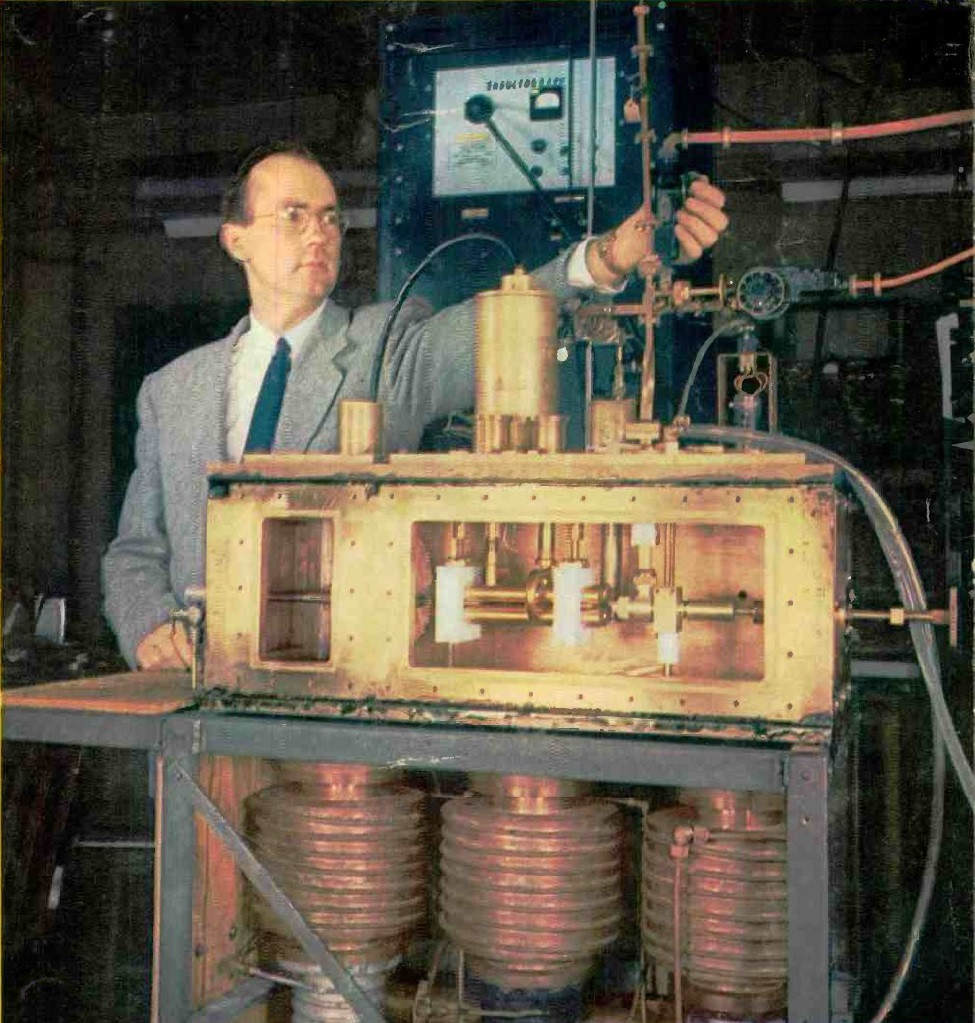
Charles H. Townes received his BS in physics from Furman. A Nobel Laureate in Physics, he invented the maser and laser.

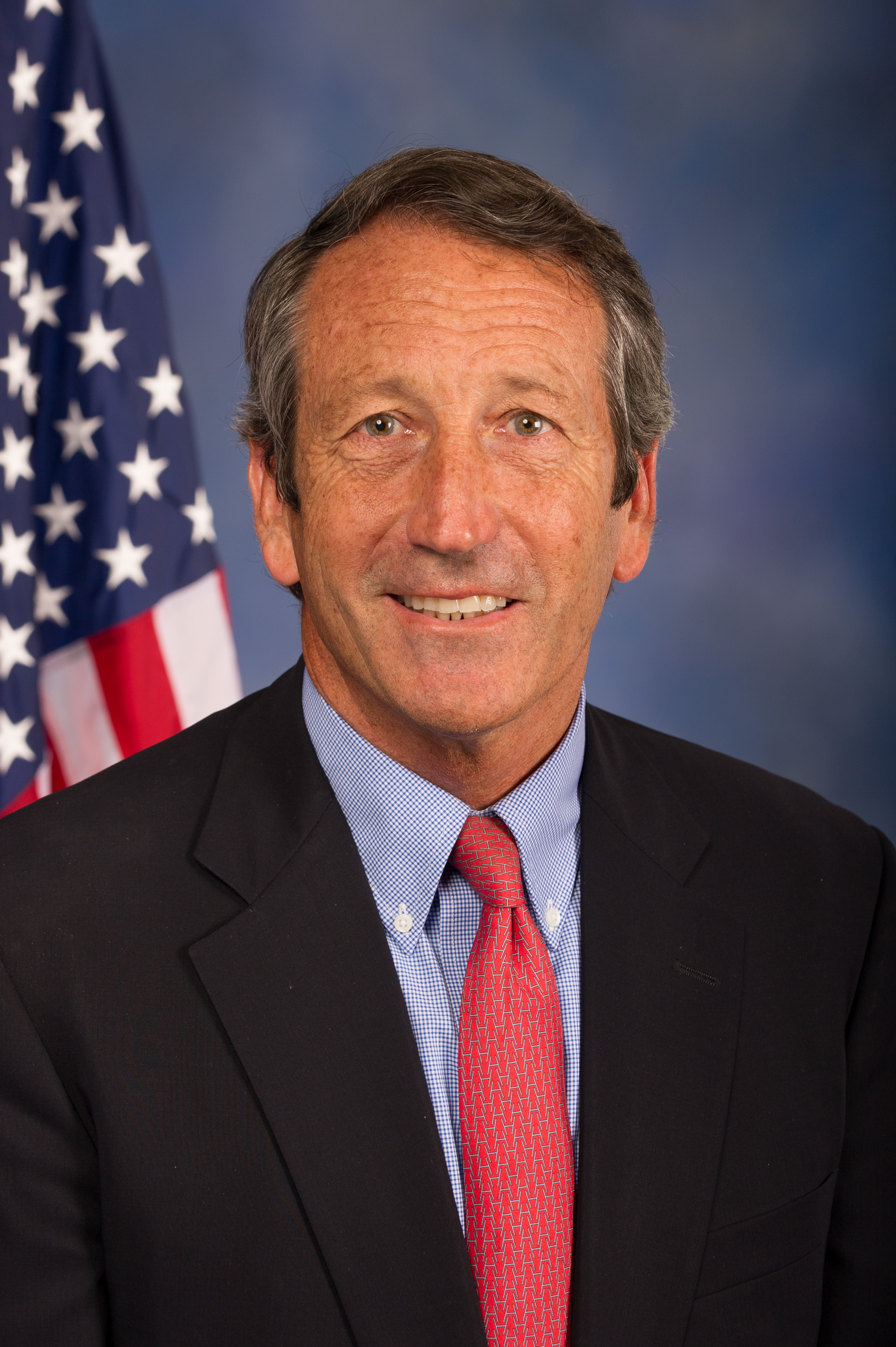
Mark Sanford received his BA in business from Furman. He was the Governor of South Carolina.

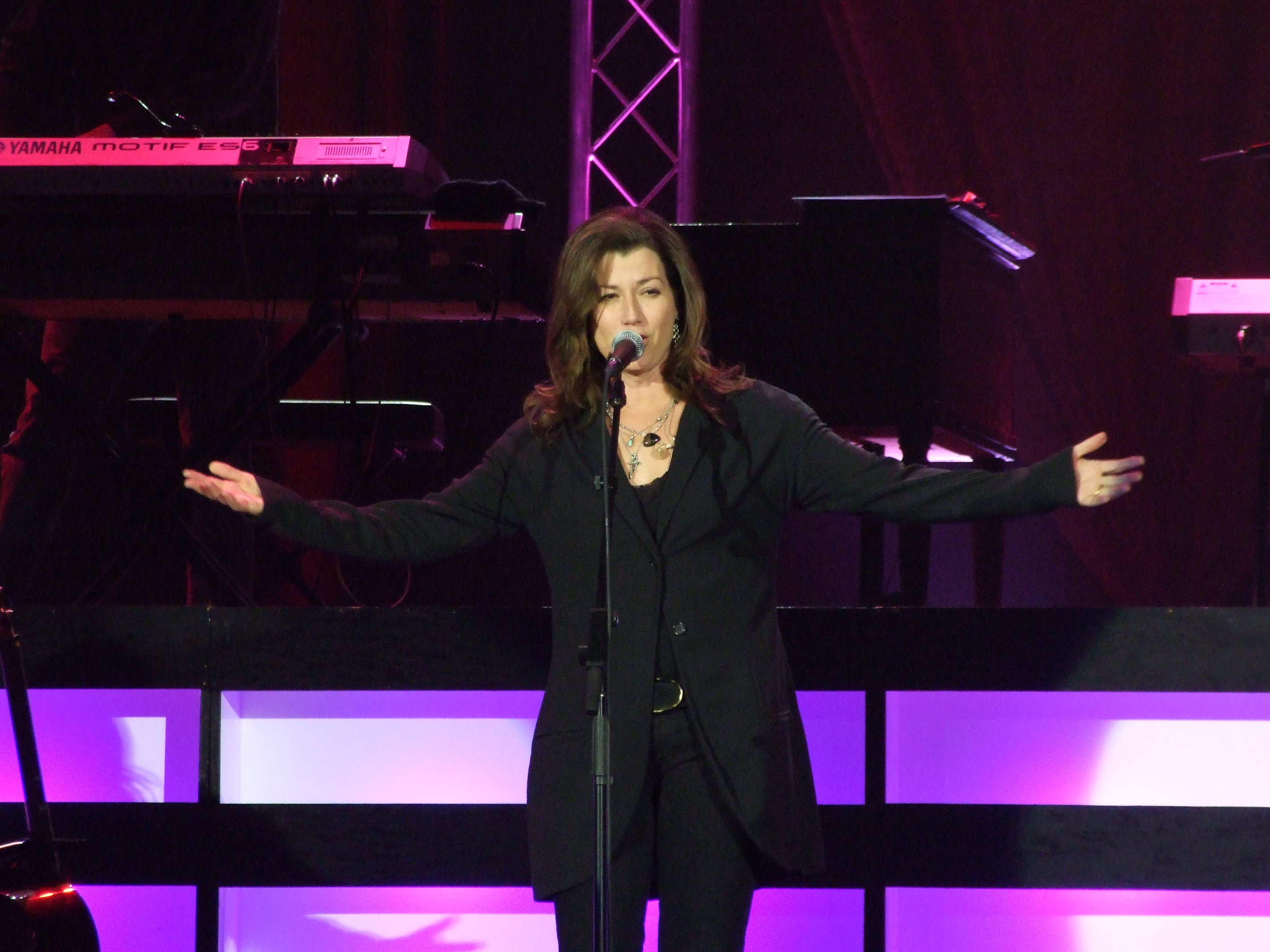
Amy Grant won six Grammy Awards. Her first ticketed concert took place during her first year at Furman.

=== Notable faculty ===
- Alan Axelrod, historian and author of business and management books
- Jay Bocook, composer and arranger, whose work was heard during the 1984 Olympic Games Opening Ceremonies in Los Angeles
- Anthony Ensolen, writer and translator of classical works
- Dan Forrest, composer and pianist known for his choral music
- Thomas T. Goldsmith Jr., physicist, who helped pioneer the invention of color television, and inventor of the first video game
- Mark Kilstofte, musician, winner of the American Academy in Rome's Rome Prize for 2002–2003
- Brent Nelsen, political scientist and professor
- William Preucil, composer, violinist and Grammy Award winner
- Richard Riley, politician, Governor of South Carolina and sixth U.S. Secretary of Education
- Edvard Tchivzhel, conductor and music director
- Charles H Townes, physicist, 1964 Nobel Prize winner in Physics

== See also ==
- South Carolina Baptist Historical Collection
- South Carolina Poetry Archives
