= John Henry Devereux =

American architect (1840–1920)

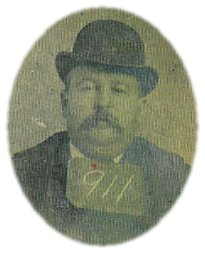
- c. 1902
- Born: 26 July 1840; County Wexford, Ireland
- Died: 16 March 1920 (aged 79); Charleston County, South Carolina, U.S.
- Other name: John Henry Delorey
- Occupation: Architect
- Practice: Postbellum Civil War; Charleston architecture
- Buildings: United States Post Office and Courthouse (Charleston, SC); St. Matthew's German Evangelical Lutheran Church
- Projects: Stella Maris Church; Stevens-Lathers House; Devereux Mansion
- Design: Second Empire architecture

John Henry Devereux (26 July 1840 – 16 March 1920), also called John Delorey before 1860, (Note: His name has sometimes been styled as "Devereaux". See "Charleston SC Historic Churches". visit-historic-charleston.com. "St. Matthew's German Lutheran Church". National Park Service.) was an American architect and builder best known for his designs in Charleston, South Carolina. According to the National Park Service, he was the "most prolific architect of the post-Civil War era" in the Charleston area. His works are listed on the U.S. National Register of Historic Places. His Charleston Post Office and Courthouse has been designated as a U.S. National Historic Landmark.

In his career, Devereux also designed a theatre, a synagogue, a Masonic hall, and Catholic, African Methodist Episcopal (AME) church, and Lutheran churches. One of the latter was the tallest building in South Carolina for over a hundred years. He blended and mixed architectural influences and styles.

== Early life and family ==
Devereux was born on 26 July 1840 into a Catholic family in County Wexford, Ireland. His parents were Nicholas and Dorothy Delorey (as they were recorded in the United States). In 1843, when he was three years old, his family immigrated to the United States. They settled in Charleston, South Carolina. He had an older brother James and a younger brother Nicholas, Jr. born after his family was in Charleston. In the 1860 census, all three sons were still living at home: James, 22, Devereux, 20, and Nicholas, Jr., 16.

In 1863 Devereux married Agatha Eulalie Brandt, an immigrant from France. The 1870 Census shows Dorothy Devereux (John's mother), age 70, living with the young couple in Charleston. The household included their son John H. D. Devereux, 5, and daughter Eulalie, 3 years old. She was born in 1867, the same year that Devereux's wife died.

In the 1880 census, Devereux was listed as widowed. His widowed mother Dorothy "Dolly" continued to live in his household. He was listed as a "Builder".

The 1900 Census of Moultrieville, Charleston, South Carolina, shows him as divorced, which may have been an error. The 1880 and 1910 Censuses recorded him as widowed. Devereux's death certificate also said that he was a widower.

== Career ==
An immigrant from Ireland as a young child, Devereux grew up in Charleston. He started work as a plasterer. After studying architecture under Edward C. Jones, a well-known Charleston architect and builder, Devereux became a noted architect of South Carolina's Lowcountry public buildings and churches.

He designed and built St. Matthew's German Evangelical Lutheran Church in the period 1867–1872. As a bonus, the church gave him a sterling silver tea set. At 255 feet, St. Matthews was the tallest building in South Carolina until 1973.

Much of Devereux's work in Charleston is proximate to the corner of Meeting and Broad streets, an area locally known as the "Four Corners of Law." The federal post office and courthouse, which he designed, exemplifies the importance of federal influence. Church and local government are additional components of the metaphor. During British colonial rule, the future US courthouse site was the location of the gallows for public executions.

In 1885, Devereux was appointed as Superintendent of Construction and Repairs of the U.S. Treasury Department, which handled public buildings. While in that position, he designed the U.S. Post Office and Courthouse in Charleston. His choice of Second Renaissance Revival architecture expressed the nobility popularly "associated with public architecture" during that epoch. Congress authorized funds in 1887 for construction of the Post Office and Courthouse building. Devereux, as the architect, started the design in 1890 and finished construction of the building in 1896. The building was a lengthy project, completed in 1896 and costing $500,000.

== Military ==
During the American Civil War, Devereux was commissioned as a captain in the Confederate Army in 1864; he was taken prisoner on 25 February 1865. He was imprisoned in Fortress Monroe, Virginia in Casement no. 6. He was paroled 10 May 1865, a month after General Robert E. Lee's surrender at Appomattox Court House.

== Death ==
According to his death certificate, "Colonel" Devereux died from general arteriosclerosis with a contributing preexisting factor of "paralysis from Cerebral hemorrhage". He was buried in Devereux Chapel in Charleston's Saint Lawrence Cemetery. This building was razed. A large sarcophagus with Devereux's name stands at the former site of the chapel.

== Selected architectural works ==
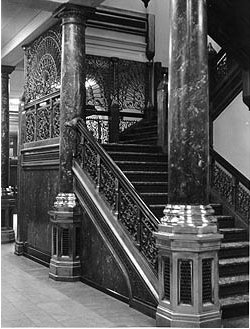
post office lobby

The National Park Service has recognized Devereux as Charleston's "most prolific architect of the post-Civil War era." A partial listing follows:

=== Charleston, South Carolina – United States Post Office and Courthouse ===
This Charleston building was completed by Devereux in 1896. The building was individually listed in the National Register of Historic Places in 1974, and is also within the boundaries of the National Register and National Historic Landmark Charleston Historic District. Today, the building continues to operate as a post office and courthouse.

=== Emanuel African Methodist Episcopal Church ===
Devereux designed the large, Gothic church for its black congregation; it was erected starting in spring 1891 and completed in 1892. The AME Church was the first independent black congregation in the United States, founded in Philadelphia, Pennsylvania. After the Civil War, its missionaries planted many new congregations in the South, including in Charleston.

=== St Matthew's German Evangelical Lutheran Church ===
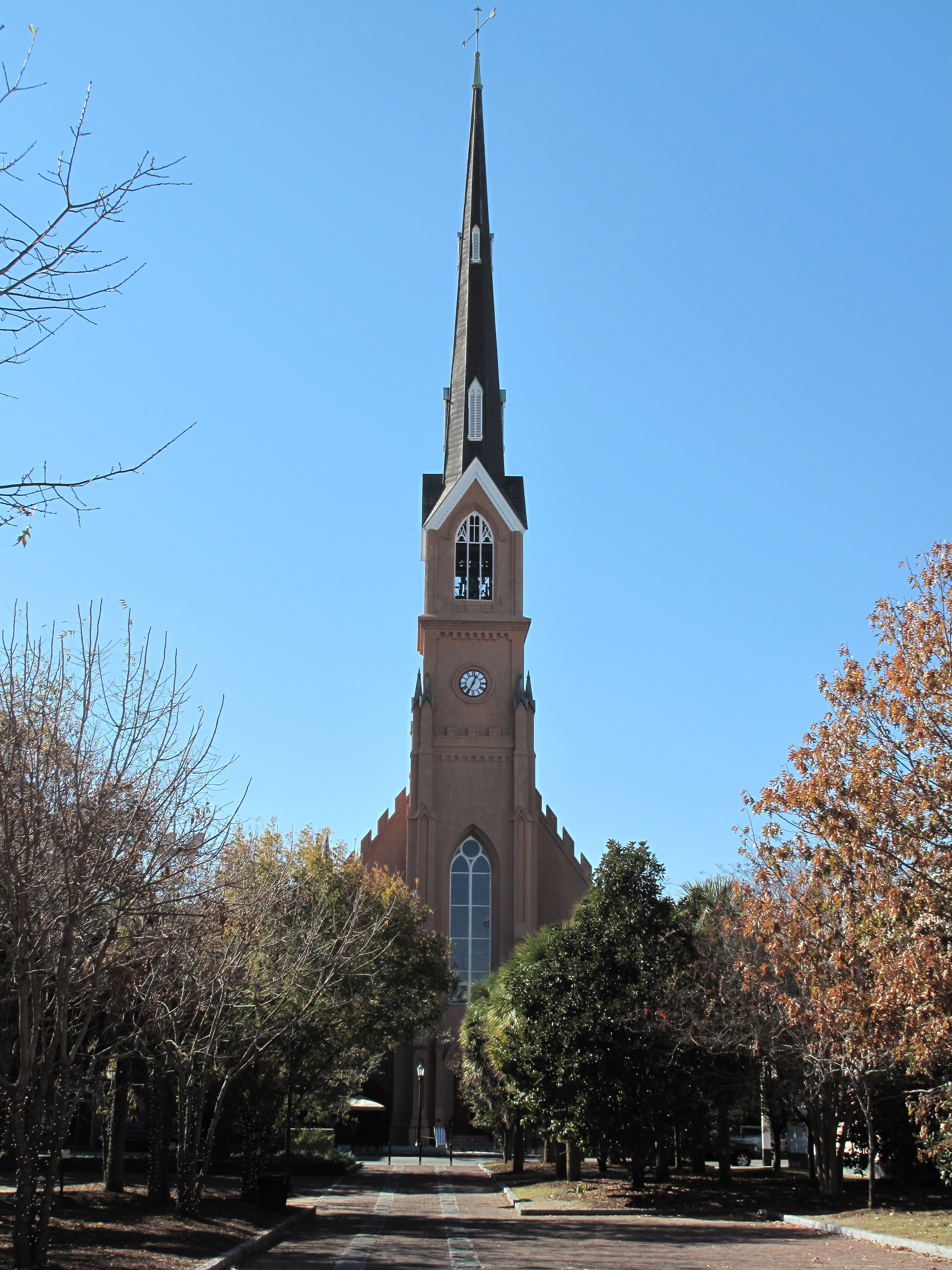
St Matthews

Responding to the needs of a growing ethnic German community after a new wave of immigration following the 1848 revolutions, the German Lutherans purchased land on King Street on which to build a new church in 1867–72. They selected Devereux as the architect. Devereux chose a Gothic Revival design.

The original facade was stucco, scored to resemble stonework and painted in different colors, using paint that was mixed with sand, simulating the look of stonework using different colors of stone. This "polychrome" effect reflected a motif for church architecture popularized at the time in The Stones of Venice by John Ruskin. As originally conceived, the black and white Ablaq facade was striking, although it has since been covered over.

The church's steeple is the tallest in South Carolina, and for 101 years (until 1973) the church was the state's tallest building. Its height was not surpassed until 1973, when the Tower at 1301 Gervais was built.

In the cyclone of 1885, the steeple fell. Its wrought iron spiral and finial built by Christopher Werner was destroyed, and not replaced due to cost. A fire in 1965 caused the steeple to topple; it fell to the ground, impaling the spire eighteen feet deep, where it remains embedded to this day. The church's stained glass was not affected. The church was restored after the fire.

=== Stella Maris Church ===
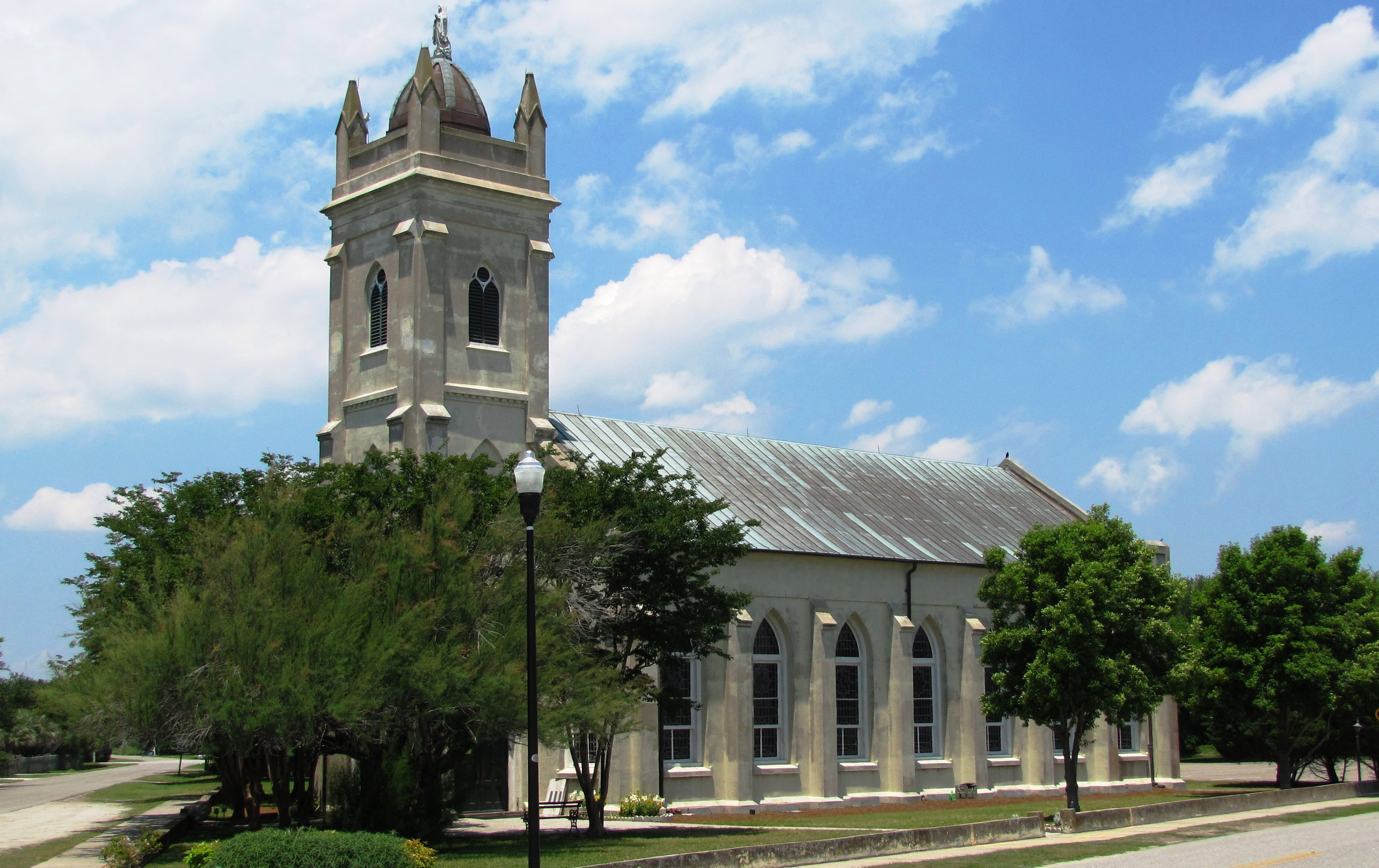
Stella Maris

Devereux designed the Stella Maris Church and supervised its construction on Sullivan's Island in Charleston.

=== 20 South Battery (aka the Stevens-Lathers House or Battery Carriage House Inn) ===
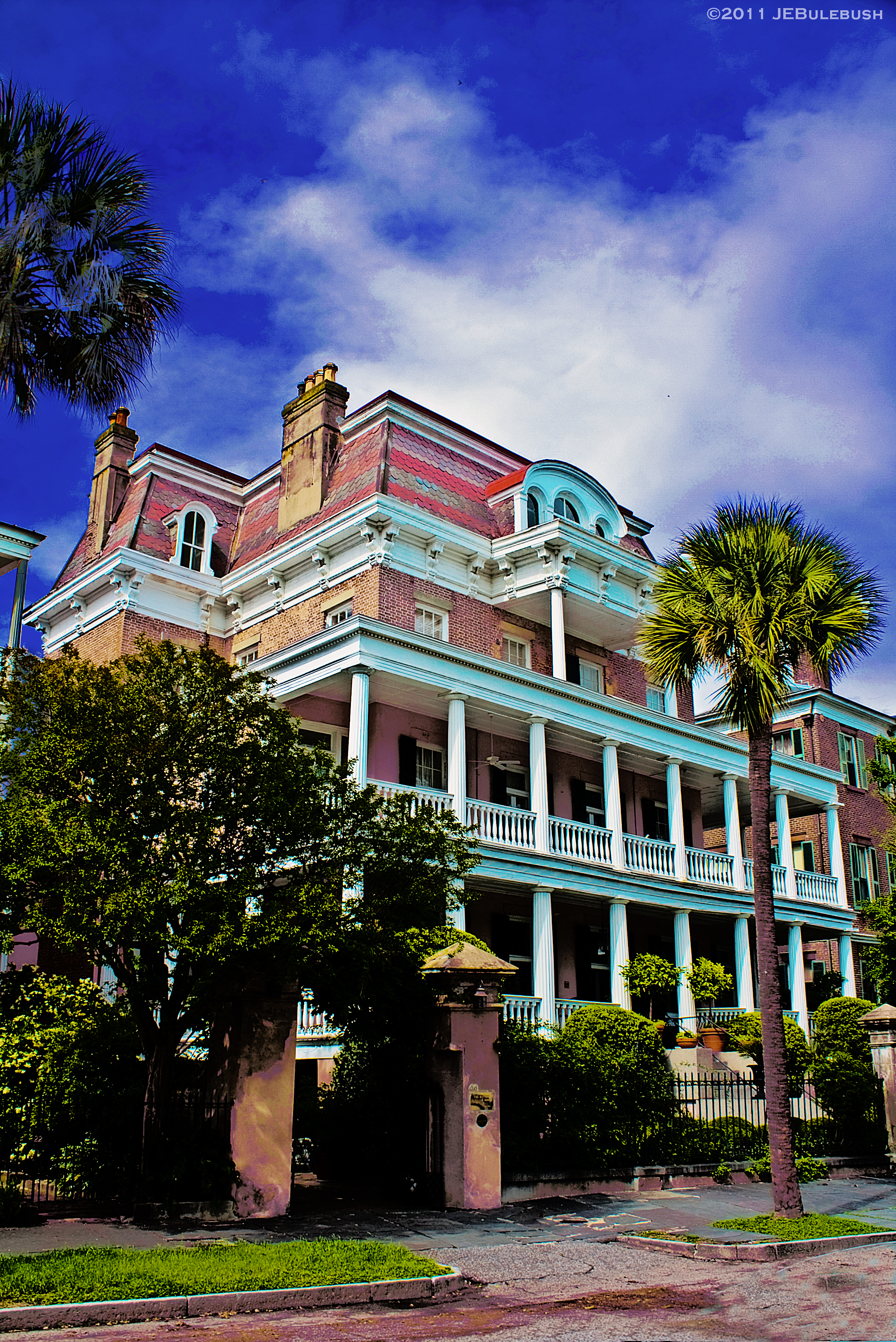
Lathers House

This house was originally built in 1843 for Samuel S. Stevens. Devereux was hired after the Civil War by its next owner, Colonel Richard Lathers, a Southerner who fought for the Union Army. He wanted the house at 20 South Battery to be remodeled in the popular Second Empire style. Devereux also added a library, with a mansard roof.

He constructed a "ballroom", which Lathers used as a conference room, for meetings with his wealthy Yankee connections. His associations were unpopular and the townspeople forced him out of Charleston. According to the current owner, who operates the house as a bed and breakfast: "Charlestonians eventually told Lathers he was unwelcome so he took his Yankee blood money with him and left."

Lathers used his conference room to meet with such notables as New York Governor and Presidential Candidates John H. Seymour and William Cullen Bryant, seeking sectional reconciliation. "[A]fter attempting for four years to restore good will between men of the North and the South, Lathers sold the house and returned to New York." In New York, Lathers was a patron of architect Alexander Jackson Davis, who created "Lathers' Hill" and associated gothic cottages for him.

=== 24 South Battery c.1790? ===
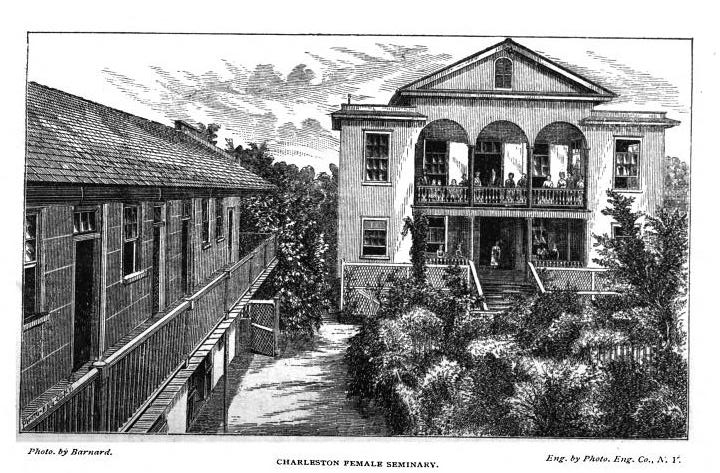
Charleston Female Seminary

The western half of this 18th-century double tenement (the eastern half was demolished) was remodeled in 1870 for George S. Cook, the noted photographer – he has been called "the Southern Mathew Brady". Devereux was the architect.

=== 225–227 King St. – Academy of Music/Riviera Theatre ===
In 1830 on this site was Kerrison's Department Store (see List of defunct department stores of the United States), which was reputed to be "the South's oldest department store still in operation." When the store was destroyed in the great fire of 1838, it was rebuilt by Kerrison. In 1852 it was purchased by Browning & Leman, dry goods merchants, and a new store was designed by Charleston architect Edward C. Jones.

In 1869, architect John Henry Devereux remodeled the building, which became known as the Academy of Music. The theatre opened on 1 December 1869 with a 1200-seat capacity, and it would often have sold-out houses. The acoustics were first rate. It had a "Sun burner" gas-light chandelier illumination system, set in a faux "starlit sky" ceiling, and a proscenium arch "supported by gilded columns and moldings." For seven decades it was "one of America's best known theatres . . . patterned after European opera houses" with excellent acoustics. Performers included Oscar Wilde, Sarah Bernhardt, Fanny Brice, Billie Burke, Eddie Foy, Lily Langtry, Lillian Russell, John Philip Sousa and his band, the Ziegfeld Follies and others of similar international acclaim. Important movies opened there. The building's aura faded, and it was demolished and replaced by a new building.

In 1939 the Academy of Music was replaced by an Art Deco building called the Riviera Theatre. (Note: Other notable Art Deco Buildings in Charleston include: Martschink Building, 26 Cumberland St.; Kress Building 281 King St. ca.1931 See Smith, Ricardo, Riviera Poster, infra.) Architect Charles C. Benton described his new design as "classic modern." It operated until 1977. (Note: "The Riviera closed its doors on 5 September 1977 leaving no motion picture house in operation in peninsular Charleston for the first time since the Theatorium opened in 1907." Coles, John; Tiedje, Mark. "Riviera Theatre". South Carolina Movie Theaters.)

=== 249 King St. ===
In 1875, Susan Wood contracted for a three-story brick building designed and built by Devereux, replacing an earlier structure destroyed by fire that year. Although the Italianate facade was remodeled early in the 20th century, its architectural integrity remains. In order, it housed a dry goods merchant, J.R. Read & Co., and then a studio and residence of George Bernard.

=== 270 King Street – Masonic Temple ===
In order to undertake this contract to build a Masonic Temple and defuse any criticism that it was designed by someone not a Mason, Devereux, who was a Roman Catholic, took the Entered Apprentice Degree of Masonry. He fashioned his design in the Tudor Gothic style, and it was constructed of brick and stucco. Though remodeled several times, its original 1872 beauty persists to a degree. In a 1984 renovation, the "Gothic-arched storefronts were restored." See pic at Flickr.

=== 134 Broad Street – John Klinck House ===
Designed for wealthy Charleston grocery store owner John Klinch, the house was constructed in 1872. It is a combination of Gothic Revival and Italianate stylings, an upright-and-wing structure with a prominent two-story porch across the wing.

=== 152 Broad St. c.1885 ===
John Henry Devereux was the architect for William M. Bird, who was a partner with H.F. Welch. Their company was William M. Bird & Co., "wholesale dealers in paints, oils, glass, naval stores and ship chandlery." Bird never resided there, and in 1889 sold it to Otto Tiedeman, a wholesale grocer. Architectural detail mimics features on the house at 24 South Battery. "Similarities include the prominent two tiered bay window, window treatment, piazza collonettes and railings, and other decorations. The house is faced with novelty siding typical of the period and the foundation is of Stoney Landing brick, made locally in the 1880s."

=== 68 St. Philip St. – Brith Sholom Synagogue ===
The Orthodox Jewish congregation had its synagogue there in 1874–75. Abrahams & Seyle, architects designed the Classic Revival building, and Devereux was both an architect and contractor. In 1955–56. the building's interior was reconstructed inside the Brith Sholom Beth Israel Synagogue at 182 Rutledge Ave. See History of the Jews in Charleston, South Carolina.

=== 50 St. Philip St. – Charleston Female Seminary ===
What is a now a parking lot includes the site of the Charleston Female Seminary, which was founded by Henrietta Aiken Kelley in 1870. "Miss Kelley's School", as it was called, was one of the South's leading girls' schools. Constructed in 1871, Devereux used "mixed Roman" or Italianate architecture, and "an arcaded and pedimented facade."

=== 1914 Middle Street, Sullivan's Island – Devereux Mansion ===
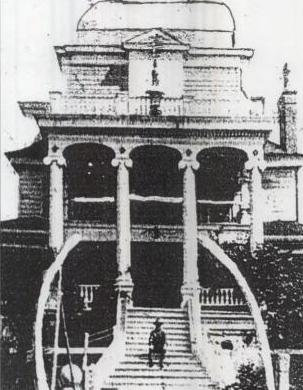
Devereux Mansion c. 1875

Devereux's personal mansion, built by himself in 1875, was expansive and opulent. The elaborate gate house and massive main "once dwarfed all others on the island". Devereux took up residence in Charleston and spent his summers on Sullivan's Island. His mansion gateway had whale's jawbones, (Note: Whale jawbones have been used as architectural accents and structures elsewhere. See North Berwick Law, Stewart Park, Aberdeen, Ye Olde Curiosity Shop, The Meadows (park), Wyk auf Föhr (Carl Haeberlin Frisian Museum), Providensky District, and Royal Sydney Yacht Squadron) and the garden contained a ship's wooden figurehead of a lady. All that remains today is the Gatehouse that was restored in 2005 under the direction of C. Jennings Smith of Sullivan's Island, SC

=== W.L.I. Obelisk, Washington Square, Charleston ===
Monument erected by the Washington Light Infantry Association in honor of their Confederate dead. This monument replaces an earlier one in Magnolia Cemetery (ca. 1867). Plans were completed in February 1889, and the monument unveiled on July 21, 1891.

Located in the center of Washington Square, which is adjacent to City Hall at the NE corner of Meeting Street and Broad Street. The monument is an obelisk on a star and die block, rising from a platform elevated by three steps above the surrounding ground. Carolina granite (Winnsboro Blue?) was used to construct the monument, and the names of battles that the three Companies of the W.L.I. participated in are engraved in the step risers. Four bronze plaques, one on each side, bear the names of those remembered.

=== Camden, South Carolina – Opera House ===
This building was designed by Devereux in 1885.

=== Blackville, South Carolina – St. Matthew's ===
The plans for St. Matthew's were drawn in 1884.

== See also ==
- Charleston, South Carolina – Art, architecture, literature, science
- Gothic Revival architecture
- List of tallest churches in the world

== Bibliography ==
=== References ===
- "GSA – U.S. Post Office and Courthouse, Charleston, SC". General Services Administration. Archived from the original on 1 June 2017.
- "Charleston Historic Religious and Community Buildings". National Park Service. Archived from the original on 22 October 2007.
- Coles, John; Tiedje, Mark. "Academy of Music – Charleston, SC". South Carolina Movie Theaters.
- Coles, John; Tiedje, Mark. "Riviera Theatre". South Carolina Movie Theaters.
- Lathers, Richard (1907). Grafton, Alvin F. (ed.). Reminiscences of Richard Lathers: 60 years of a Full Life in Massachusetts, South Carolina and New York. Grafton Press.
- Legerton, Clifford L (1966). Lilly, Edward G. (ed.). Historic Churches of Charleston (Hardcover). Charleston: Legerton & Co. pp. 40–41, 140–141.
- Poston, Jonathan H (1997). The Buildings of Charleston: A Guide to the City's Architecture (hardcover). Columbia, South Carolina: University of South Carolina Press. ISBN 1-57003-202-5.
- Ravenel, Beatrice St. Julien (1992). Architects of Charleston. Carl Julien (photographs), Carolina Art Association. Columbia, S.C.: University of South Carolina Press. ISBN 0-87249-828-X. LCCN 91034126. Archived from the original on 5 October 2013.
- Stoney, Samuel Gaillard (1960). This is Charleston: a survey of the architectural heritage of a unique American city. Carolina Art Association. p. 137.
- South Carolina Historical Society (1902). This Discursive Biographical Sketch of Colonel Richard Lathers, 1841–1902. Philadelphia, Pennsylvania: J. B. Lippincott & Co. p. 80. "alexander jackson davis winyah."
- Wells, John E.; Dalton, Robert E. (1992). The South Carolina architects, 1885–1935: a biographical dictionary. Richmond, Virginia: New South Architectural Press. ISBN 1-882595-00-9.
- Whitelaw, Robert N. S.; Levkoff, Alice F. (1976). Charleston, come hell or high water: a history in photographs. Columbia, S.C.: University of South Carolina Press. p. 89.
