= Sounding board =

Acoustic amplifier

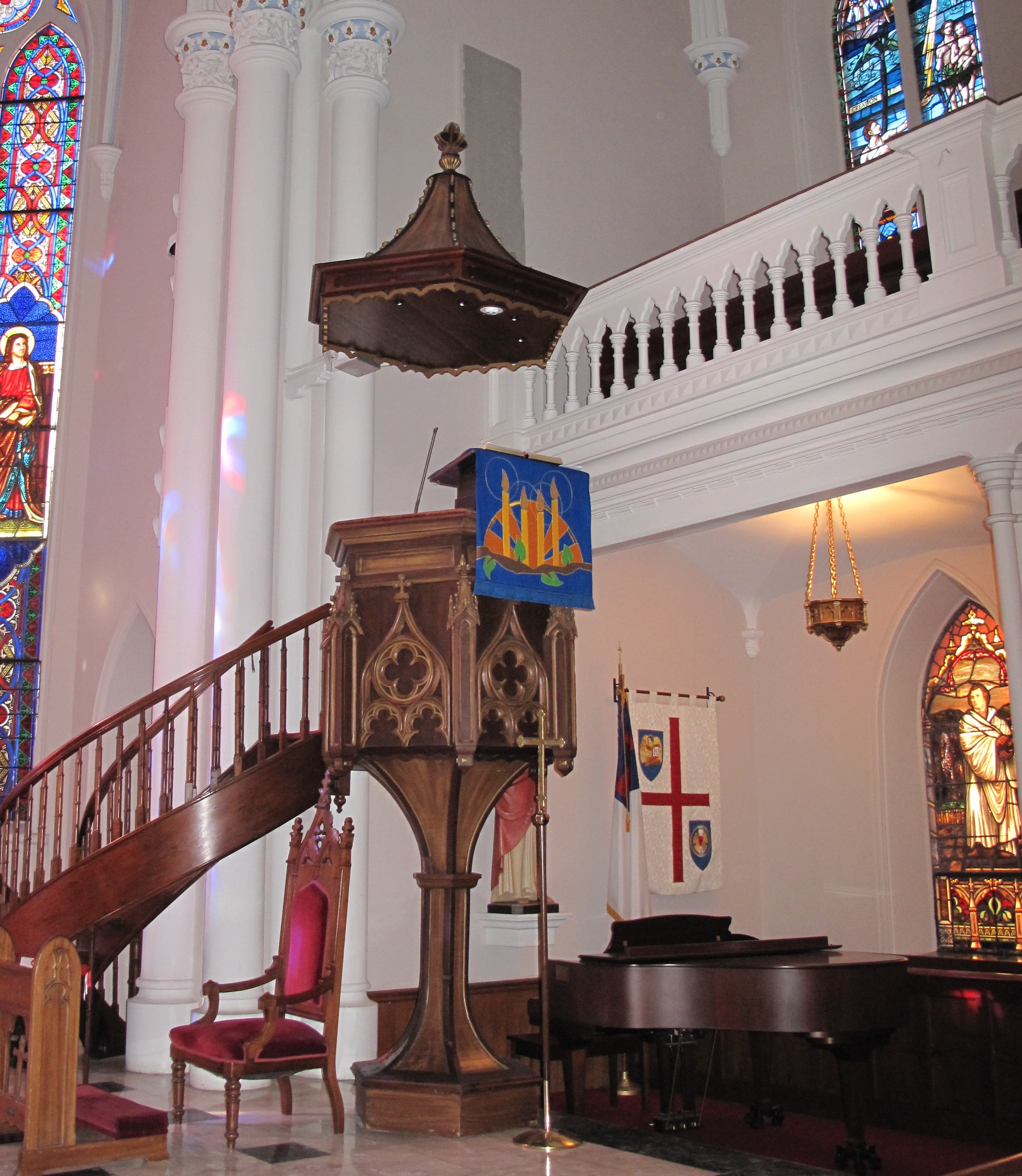
"Wine glass" pulpit and sounding board at St. Matthew's German Evangelical Lutheran Church in Charleston, SC

A sounding board, also known as a tester and abat-voix, is a structure placed above and sometimes also behind a pulpit or other speaking platform that helps to project the sound of the speaker. It is usually made of wood. The structure may be specially shaped to assist the projection, for example, being formed as a parabolic reflector. In the typical setting of a church building, the sounding board may be ornately carved or constructed. The term "abat-voix," from the French word for the same thing (abattre (“to beat down”) + voix (“voice”)), is also used in English.

== See also ==
- Baldachin - canopy over altar or throne
- Chhatri
