= St. Matthew's German Evangelical Lutheran Church =

German Lutheran church in South Carolina

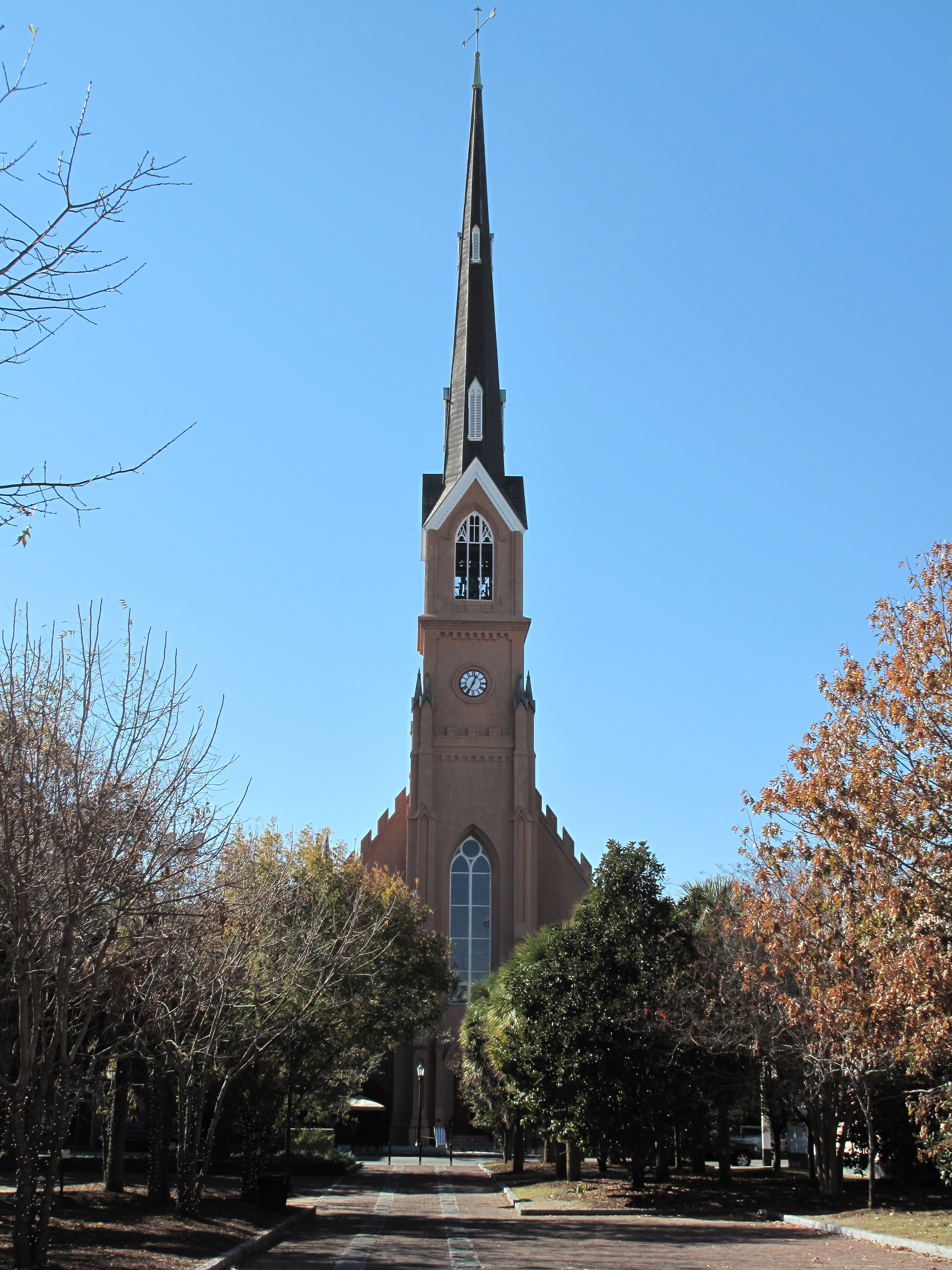
- St. Matthew's German Evangelical Lutheran Church

Religion
- Affiliation: Evangelical Lutheran Church in America
- District: South Carolina Synod
- Ecclesiastical or organizational status: Congregation
- Leadership: The Rev. Eric Childers, Senior Pastor Rev. A.J. Houseman, Campus Ministry Pastor Jason Bazzle, Organist and Director of Music

Location
- Location: 405 King Street, Charleston, South Carolina, U.S.
- Interactive map of St. Matthew's German Evangelical Lutheran Church
- Coordinates: 32.7868°N 79.9372°W

Architecture
- Architect: John Henry Devereux
- Style: Gothic Revival
- Completed: 1872

Specifications
- Direction of façade: North East
- Capacity: 765+
- Length: 157 ft (48 m)
- Width: 64 ft (20 m)
- Width (nave): 56 ft (17 m)
- Spire: 1
- Spire height: 255 ft (78 m)
- Materials: cement render over brick

Website
- St. Matthew's Lutheran Church

The German Evangelical Lutheran Church of Charleston, South Carolina, was incorporated on December 3, 1840. Through usage and custom the Church is now known as St. Matthew's German Evangelical Lutheran Church or St. Matthew's Lutheran Church and is a member of the South Carolina Synod of the Evangelical Lutheran Church in America.

== History ==
The church was founded by Johann Andreas Wagener and 49 other German-speaking citizens wishing to worship in their native language in the port city of Charleston, South Carolina. Wagener's first intent was to form a German language, "ecumenical, cosmopolitan" congregation for all faiths: Lutheran, Reformed, and Catholic. However, when the ecumenical plan failed, it was decided to organize the congregation as an Evangelical Lutheran Church. Wagener was elected the congregation's first president. He established the town of Walhalla, South Carolina, in 1849 as a colony for German immigrants. Later he became a brigadier general in the Confederate States Army and served as the Commandant of Charleston until the evacuation of the city in February 1865. In 1866, he represented the Charleston district in the South Carolina House of Representatives, and in 1871, was elected mayor of Charleston.

The congregation's first purchase was a cemetery for the burial of German-speaking citizens during a yellow fever outbreak in 1841. During the first year of the congregation's organization, worship services were held in the Lecture Room of the Second Presbyterian Church at 63–65 Society Street, the German Fire Company at 6 Chalmers Street, and the Lecture Room at St. John's Lutheran Church (English) on Clifford St. (formerly known as Dutch Church Alley). The Presbyterian Lecture Room was later purchased by the Roman Catholic Diocese of Charleston in 1861 to form St. Paul's German Catholic Church. The Lutheran congregation's first church building was a classical Greek Revival structure on the northwest corner of Hasell and Anson streets. The architect was Edward Brickell White, and it was dedicated on June 22, 1842. The cost for the land and construction by John Dawson was $11,000.

In 1856, the church purchased Bethany Cemetery because the first cemetery was full. There were several additional yellow fever outbreaks during the early years of the congregation. According to church records, there were 147 deaths in 1854, 308 in 1858, and 130 in 1865, of which 84 were children. During the worst outbreaks, Pastor Ludwig "Louis" Müller officiated at three funerals every day.

During the American Civil War, only the sanctuary windows and some furnishings were damaged during the Siege of Charleston. By 1860, Germans represented 5% of the Charleston population. The congregation had outgrown the original sanctuary by 1868 when 40 applications for pews could not be filled. In 1878 the sanctuary was sold to a group of 53 Lutherans who formed the German Evangelical Lutheran St. Johannes Church.

In 1868, the church purchased its present site from Father Patrick O'Neill and contracted the Irish-born architect John Henry Devereux to design a Gothic revival sanctuary with suggestions from Ludwig Müller, the congregation's pastor. Devereux also designed the Renaissance Revival U.S. Post Office in Charleston. The new sanctuary was dedicated in 1872 with elaborate ceremonies and 3000 persons attending. In 1883, the church began to hold services in German and English. In 1901, a clock and set of ten bells from the Meneely Bell Foundry were installed in the steeple at a cost of $7,000. (Three additional bells were installed in 1966, when the steeple was rebuilt after a fire.) A Sunday school building was added in 1909. As the nation entered the World War I in 1917, 83 members of the church joined the military; five of whom died in the conflict. Due to anti-German sentiments during World War I, German language services had ended by 1918. The sanctuary was renovated in 1925 with an elaborate Gothic marble altar installed and the addition of a 5-stop chancel organ. In 1932, during one of the worst years of the Great Depression, an expansive Sunday school building was constructed at the cost of $81,000.

In 1941, joint services were started in the Sunday school building for armed service personnel stationed in Charleston. A program of singing, entertainment, and a social hour were held each Sunday evening during the duration of World War II. In 1944, a Service Center Building was constructed on St. Matthew's property on Vanderhorst Street by the National Lutheran Council, a cooperative body comprising eight Lutheran church bodies in the United States, who then created the Service Commission. This commission served as the official military agency of the council and worked to provide spiritual ministry to service personnel. Also during the war, German hymnals were loaned to the German prisoner of war camp in Hampton, South Carolina. The church's organist and a vocal quartet presented a program of Christmas music to the prisoners, also. In World War II, 191 members of St. Matthew's served their country; three of whom were killed.

In 1961, the final expansion and renovation of the parish buildings was completed, which included an auditorium and the air conditioning of the sanctuary and Sunday school building.

St. Matthew's plays host to many cultural events throughout the year and broadcasts its Sunday 11:00 AM service live on WSCC-FM. Professor Stefan Engels of Leipzig, noted Germany scholar on the works of Sigfrid Karg-Elert, has performed many times on the 61 rank Austin Organ. Opus No. 2085 |South Carolina| |Charleston| |St. Matthew's Evan. Luth.| 3 55 The church is also a frequent venue for Charleston Symphony Orchestra Gospel Choir concerts.

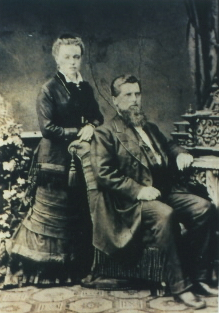
Church founder Gen. Johann Andreas Wagener with wife Maria Eliese Wagener.

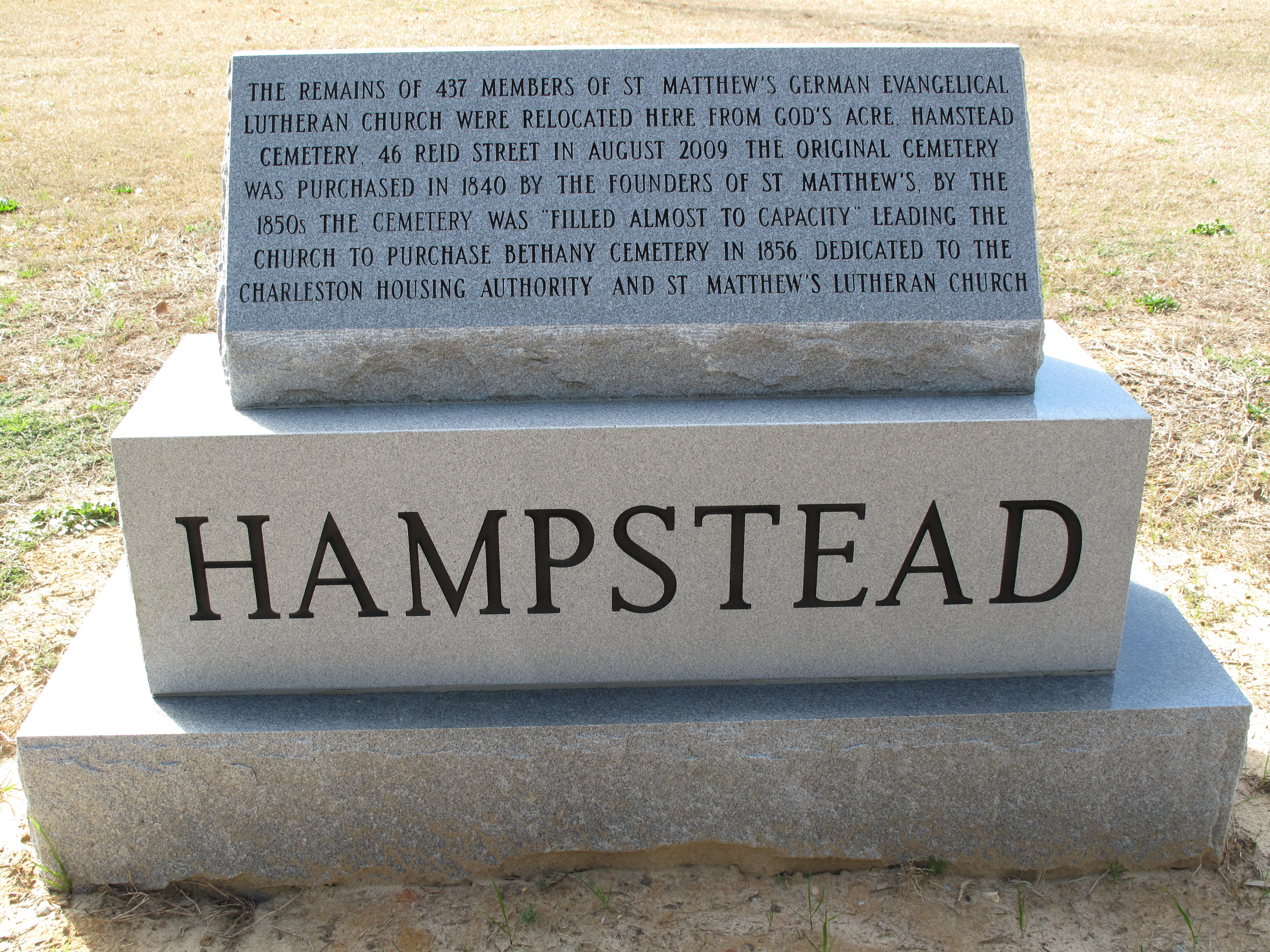
Hampstedt Cemetery was purchased to inter victims of the numerous yellow fever outbreaks in the nineteenth century.

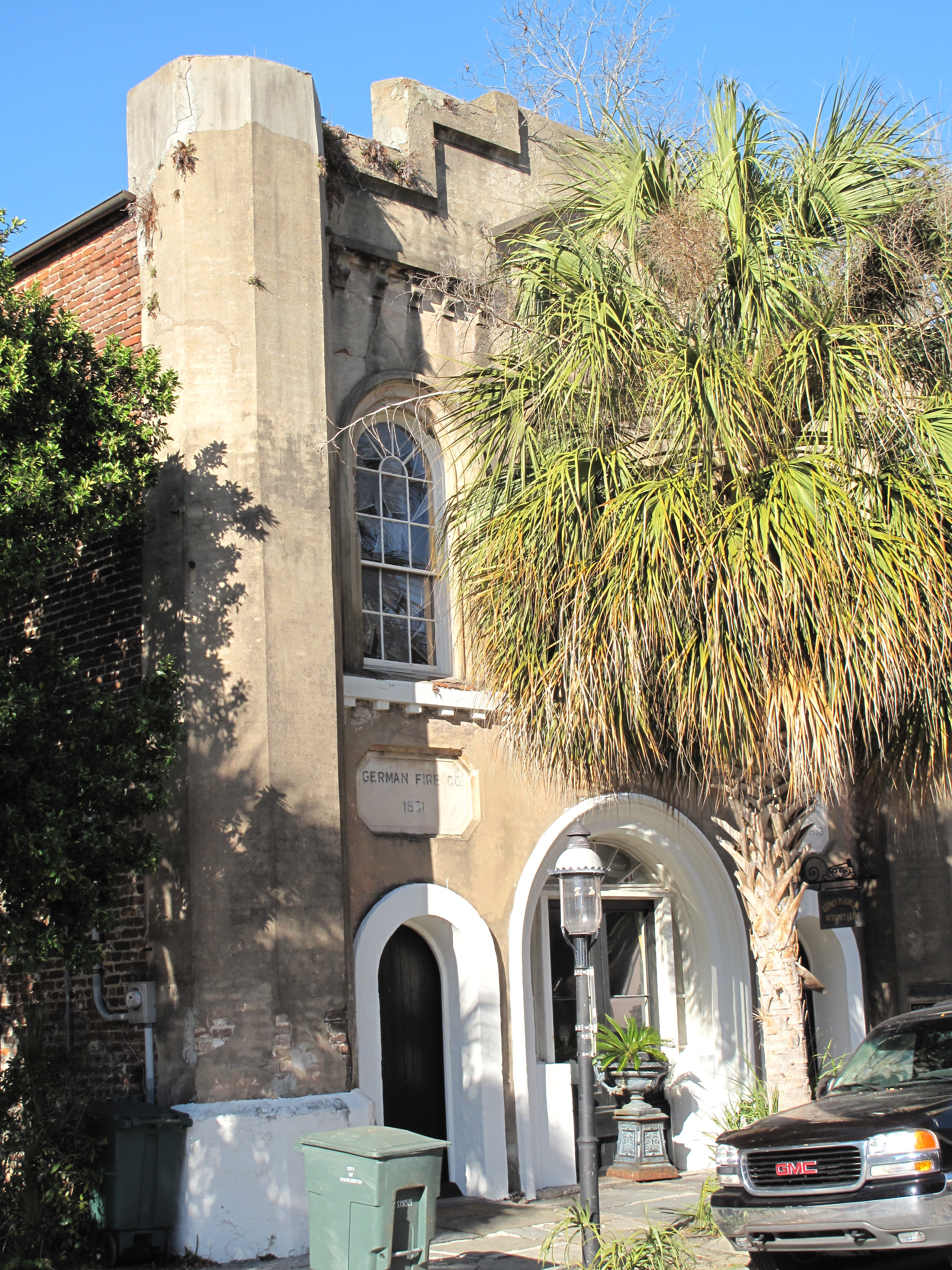
The German Fire Company headquarters was one of three worship sites for the congregation before 1842.

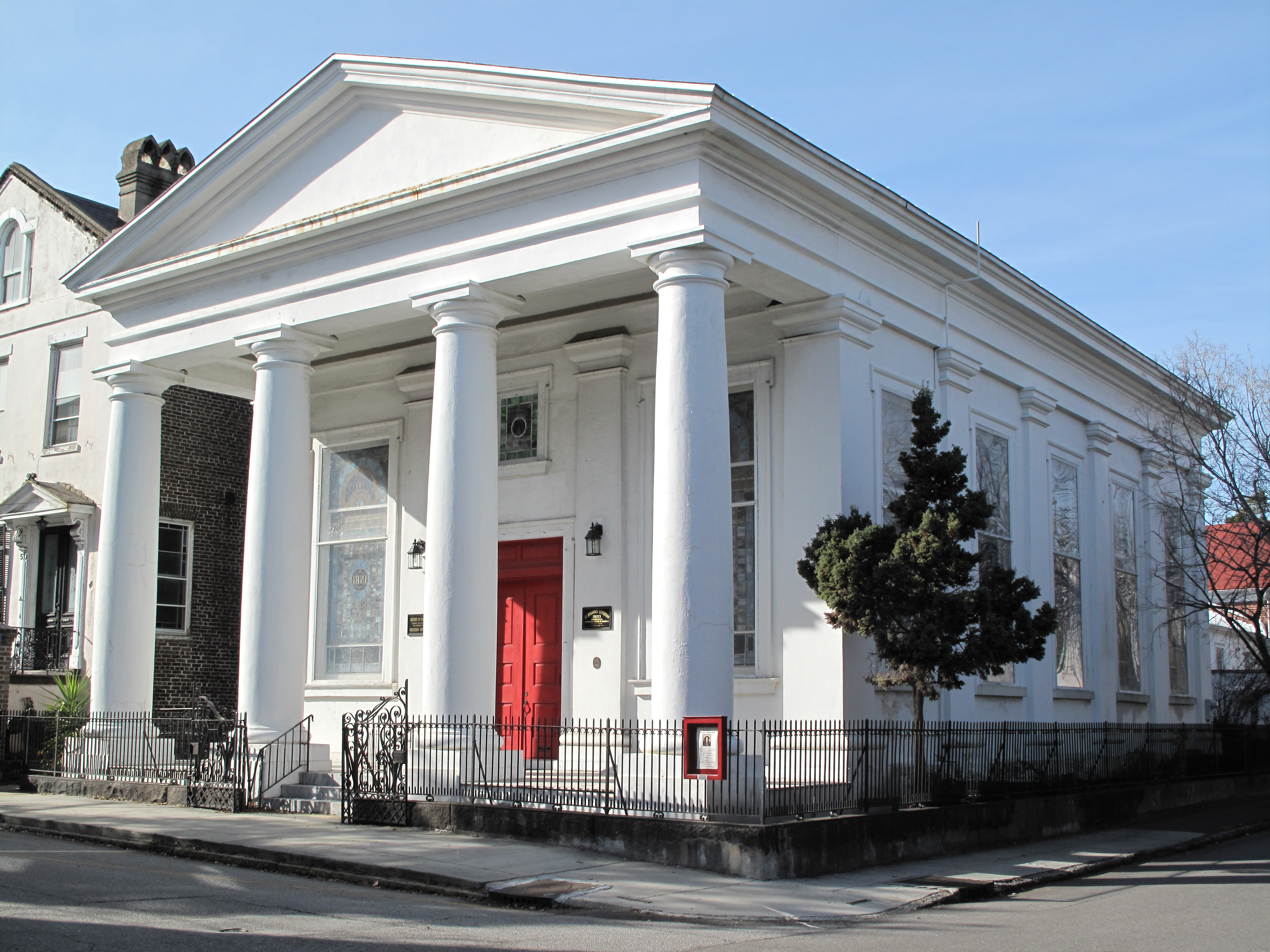
The original St. Matthew's Sanctuary built in 1842.

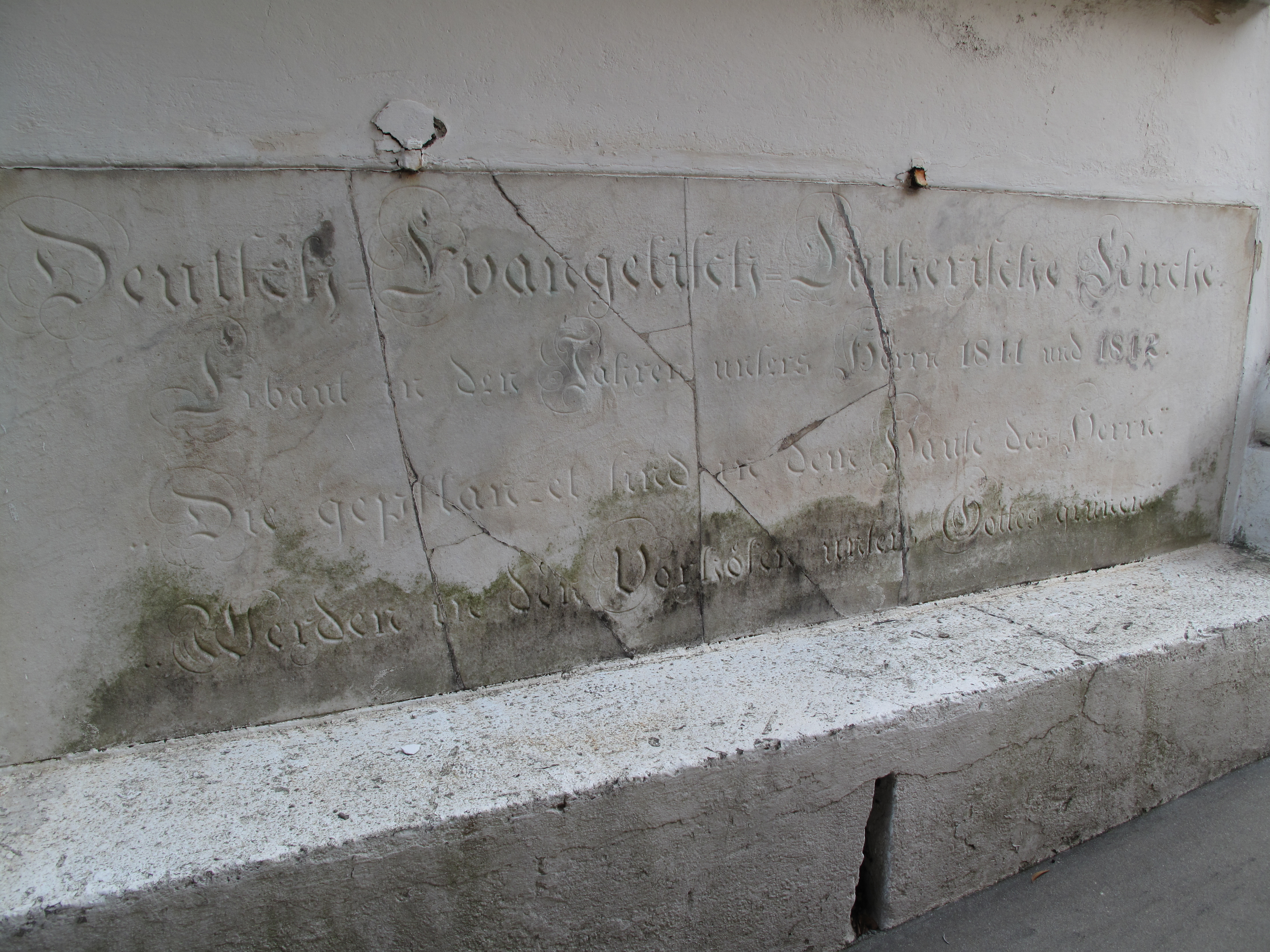
The dedication stone of the original sanctuary written in German.

Ein Feste Burg on Meneely Bells
A Mighty Fortress Is Our God on the Meneely Bell Foundry (1901) bell set.

== Fire of 1965 ==
On January 13, 1965, at approximately 6:50 pm, smoke was discovered coming from the church building. An incandescent light had ignited some painting materials in the church. Soon flames engulfed the roof. The fire appeared to be under control by 8:45 pm. However, increasing winds spread the fire to the steeple, and at 10:00 pm the structure fell directly in front of the church, plunging 18 feet (5.5 m) into the courtyard where it remains as a memorial of the event. Rather than relocate to the suburbs where most of the church members lived, the congregation decided to rebuild the historic structure. A survey of the damage showed that the chancel and all but one ground floor stained glass windows were intact. Also, the chancel furniture, altar hangings, and "wine glass" pulpit were saved. The destroyed gallery stained glass windows were replaced by Franz Mayer & Co. of Munich, Germany, and executed by the studios of George L. Payne of Paterson, New Jersey. The destroyed windows in the front of the church were replaced by the Hunt Stained Glass Studios of Pittsburgh, Pennsylvania, who had installed the originals. The first service in the restored sanctuary was on June 12, 1966.

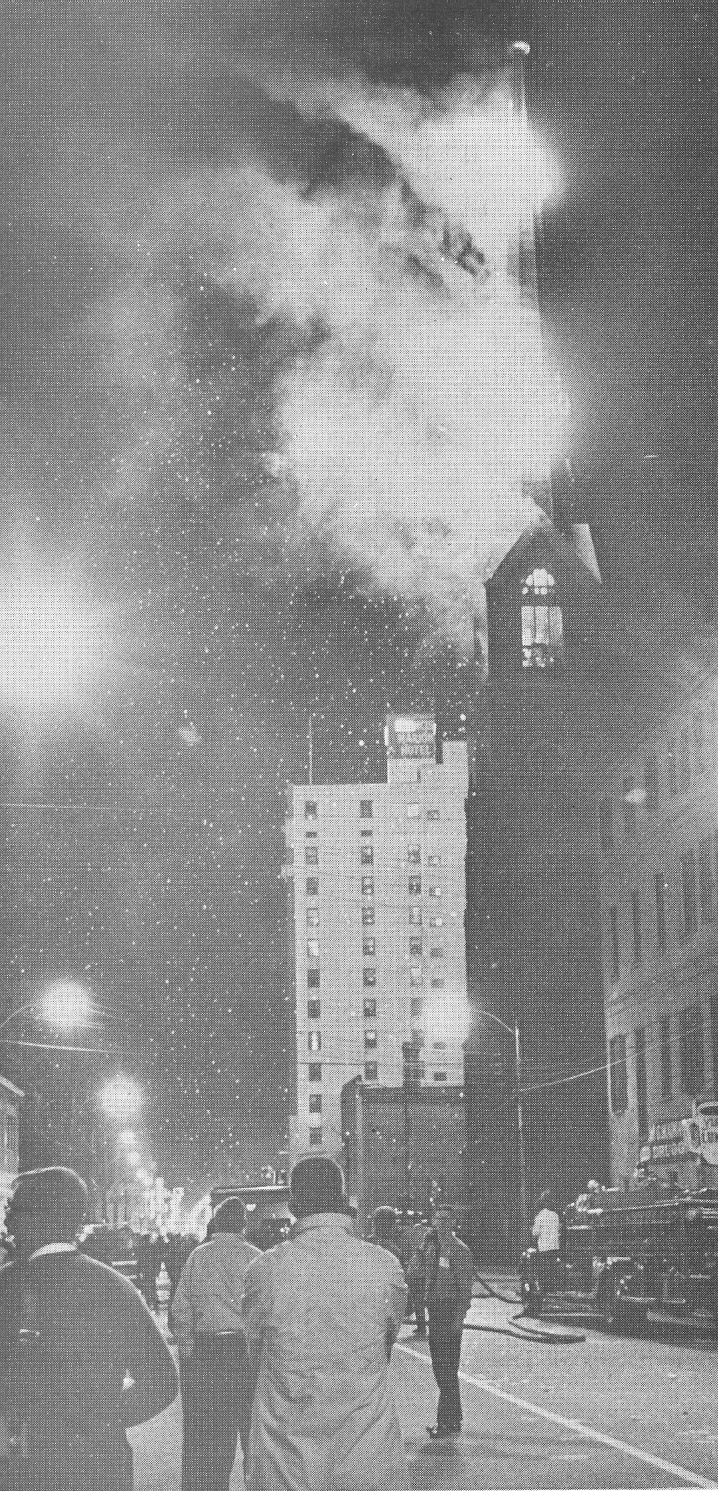
January 13, 1965.

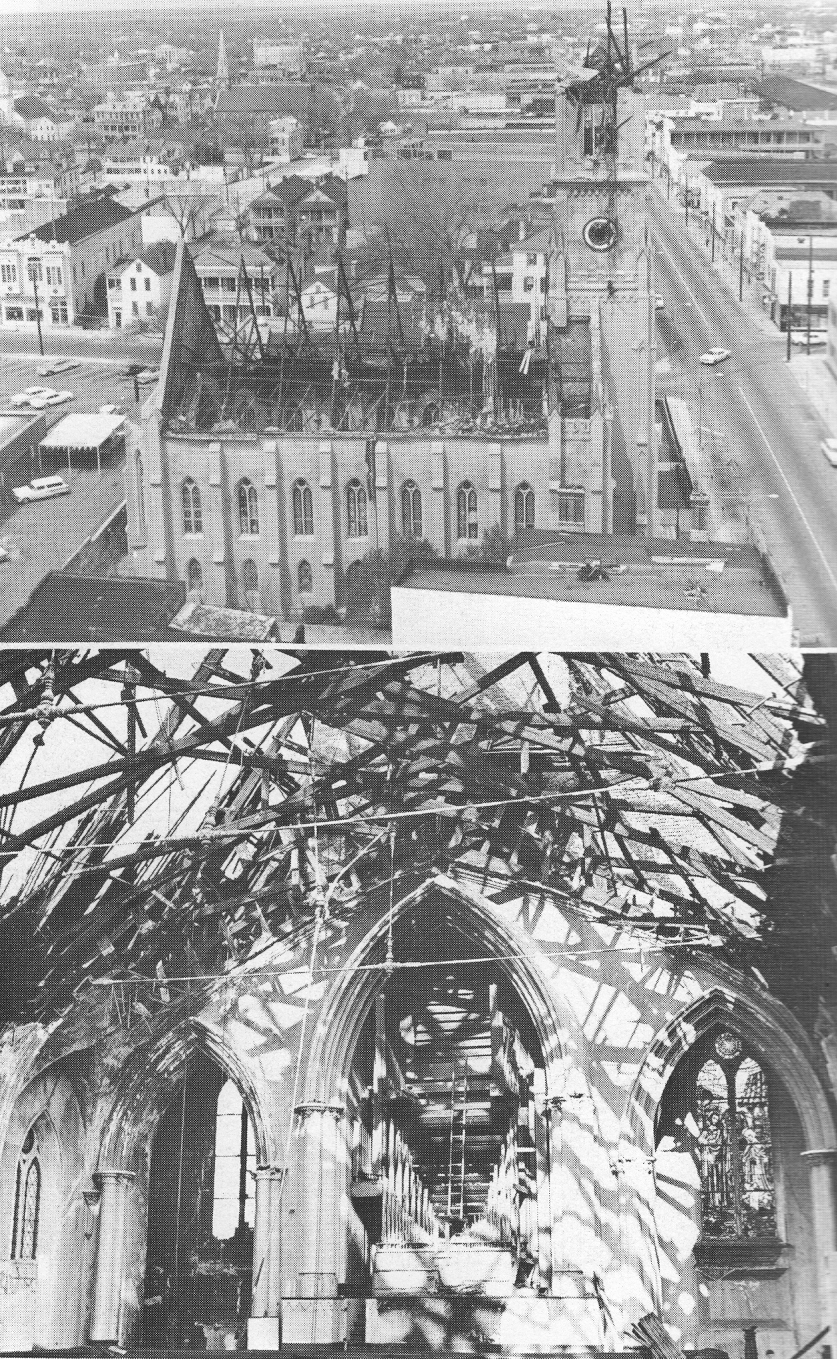
January 14, 1965.

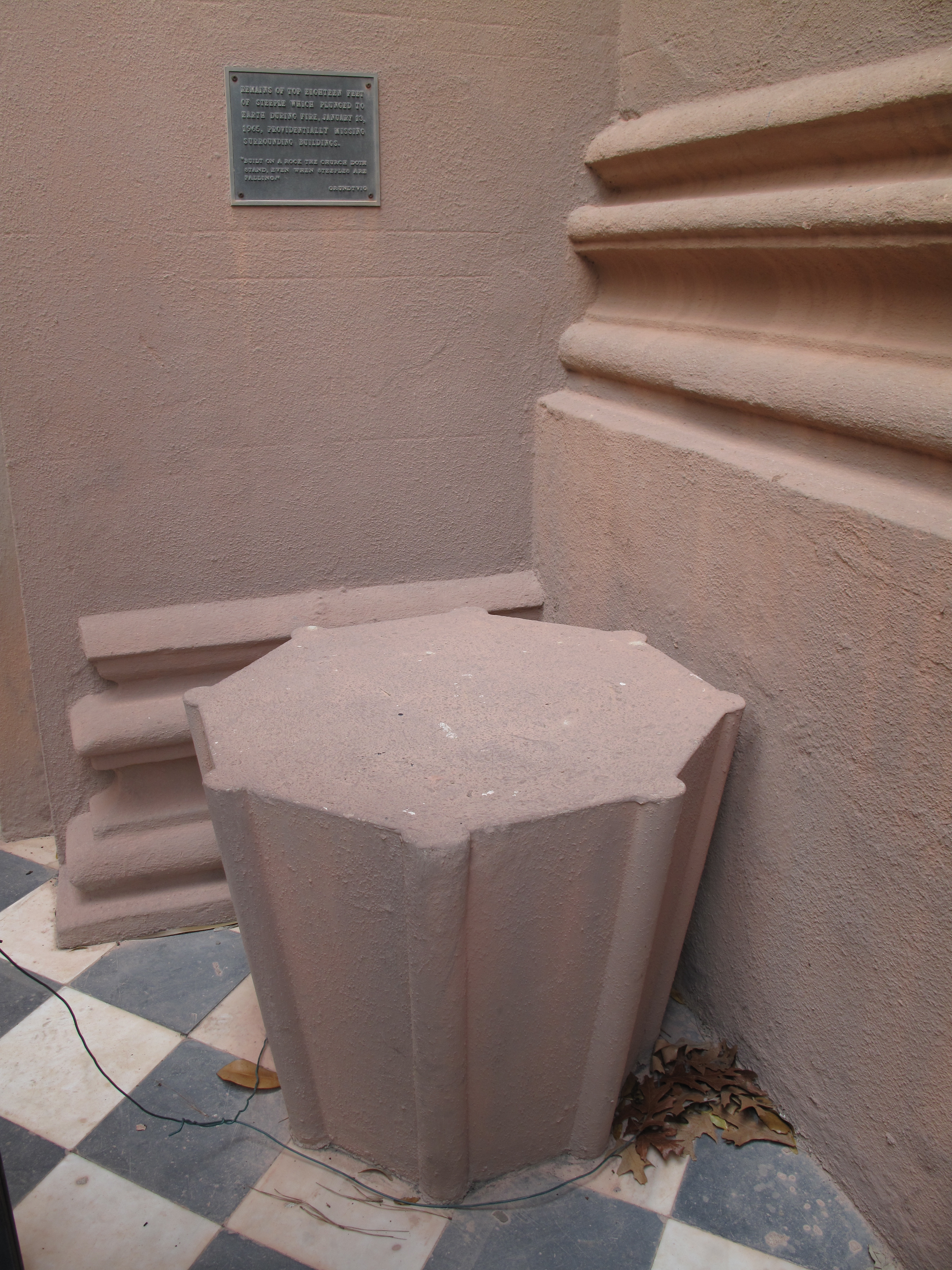
The top 18 feet (5.5 m) of the steeple remain embedded in the ground next to the sanctuary.

== Hurricane Hugo ==
When Hurricane Hugo’s 135-mile-per-hour (217 km/h) winds swept across the peninsula of Charleston at midnight on September 21, 1989, no building was left untouched, including St. Matthew's sanctuary. On Sunday morning September 24, 135 members gathered in the water-logged and darkened nave to assess the damage and offer prayer that the structure was basically still intact. Damage to the 117-year-old structure, however, was significant.

The entire steeple was denuded of its copper sheathing, large sections of the slate roof were blown off which damaged the building’s drainage system and gutters, other slate tiles damaged the adjacent educational building. Large sections of stucco were stripped from the exterior walls. Water filled the "dead-air space" of the nave walls, necessitating the resurfacing of all interior walls and the vaulted ceiling. It was also necessary to restore the decorative brackets and ornamental cherubs throughout the nave. All carpets and parquet flooring had to be replaced. Restoration and renovation of the entire facility cost over $1.6 million and took almost two years. On September 21, 1990, two years to the day after the "storm of the century", the nave and the educational building were rededicated, with South Carolina Synod Bishop James Aull leading the congregation in a service of praise and thanksgiving.

== Community Center at St. Matthew's ==
In 1999, St. Matthew's Lutheran Church launched a $1.2 million capital fund appeal to purchase and restore a historic circa 1810 building adjacent to the sanctuary to function as a Community Outreach Center. The architect, Glenn Keys, used a photo from 1883 to guide his design. According to Sanborn maps from May 1884, the building was a boot and shoe store. Since the fall of 2000, the Community Outreach Center at St. Matthew's has provided a range of services to the surrounding downtown community. Current activities include English as Second Language instruction, a Lowcountry Food Bank-affiliated Emergency Food Pantry, Holiday Care bags for the homebound elderly, and ongoing support for Charleston's Cinderella Project for teen girls now held at John Wesley United Methodist in West Ashley, which originated at the center in 2001.

In 2016, Charleston's mayor, John Tecklenburg, created a Homeless to Hope initiative to address the growing homeless population. The Community Center hosted the Next Steps of Barnabas ministry program to work with individuals to end their homelessness. Volunteers from 14 Charleston area churches were trained to mentor those in transition. In addition, the Community Center also provides direct emergency financial relief via a Sharing With A Neighbor (SWAN) program assisting with eviction and water shut-off, utility bill assistance, and other human concerns for families and individuals. To fund programs, the center relies on grant income, donations and fundraisers such as an annual charity boutique called Tea Time Treasures during Spoleto Festival USA, a fall Oktoberfest and a Christmas Charity boutique in December. In 2017, Lutheran Services Carolinas opened the Charleston office for immigration and refugee services housed in the center. This successful collaboration involved the city of Charleston, the U.S. Department of State, and Lutheran Immigration and Refugee Services (LIRS). The LIRS office clients benefited from ESL classes, employment assistance, and citizenship opportunities for those interested.

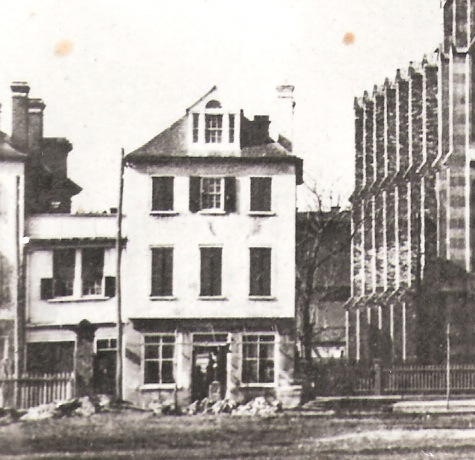
The Community Center building in 1883 when it was a Boot & Shoe store.

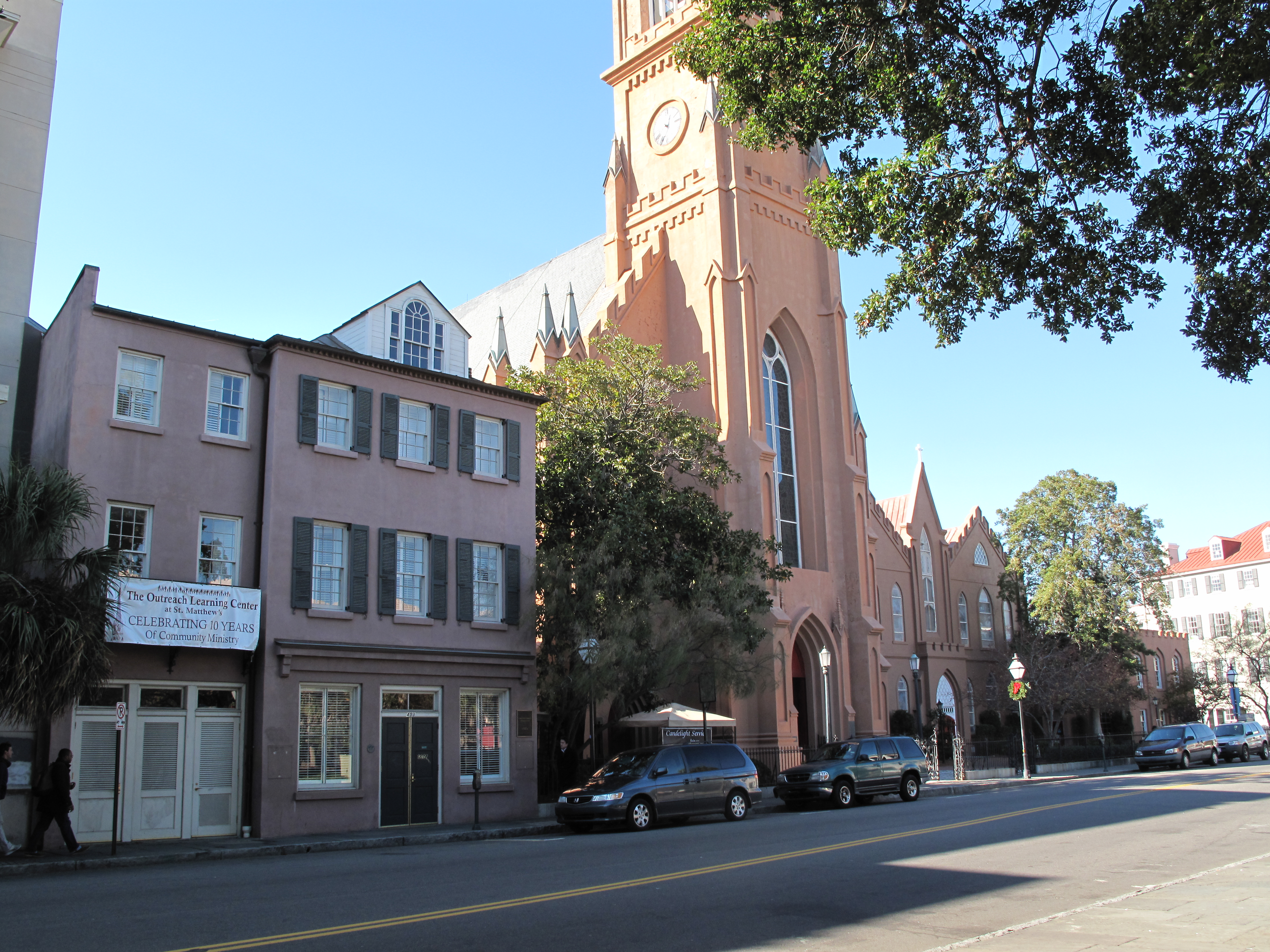
The Community Center of St. Matthew's as restored to its 1883 appearance.

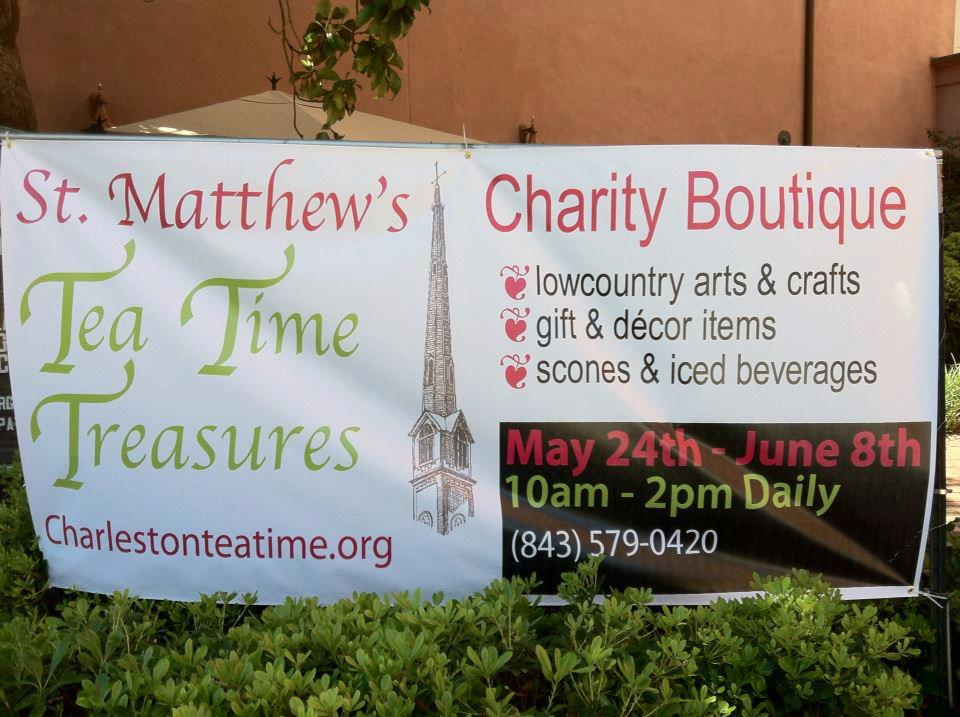
The Community Center supports its programs through a fundraiser during the Spoleto USA Festival.

== Building ==
The structure is most known for the height of its steeple, which at 255 feet (78 m), was the tallest building in South Carolina until the completion of the Tower at 1301 Gervais in 1973. It remains the tallest church steeple in the state. The building is 65 feet (20 m) wide by 157 feet (48 m) deep. Above the vestibule rise the tower and spire. At a height of 135 feet (41 m) from the ground, the tower takes an octagonal shape, then reaches upward to the terminal height of 255 feet 5/8 inch (77.740 m). The spire was originally topped by a wrought iron finial made by German-born Christopher Werner, who also created the Palmetto Monument on the state capitol grounds in Columbia, South Carolina. The finial was destroyed in the cyclone of 1885 and not replaced due to cost. The nave is 100 feet (30 m) long by 56 feet (17 m) wide and the vaulted ceiling rises 72 feet (22 m) above the box pews. Originally the interior and exterior were painted in a faux stone finish, and in the 1880s, the exterior displayed a black and white Ablaq banded effect. Presently the interior is white and the exterior is plastered in medium red. St. Matthew's is listed as an exceptional contributing property of the Charleston Old and Historic District and is a contributing building in the Charleston National Historic Landmark District.

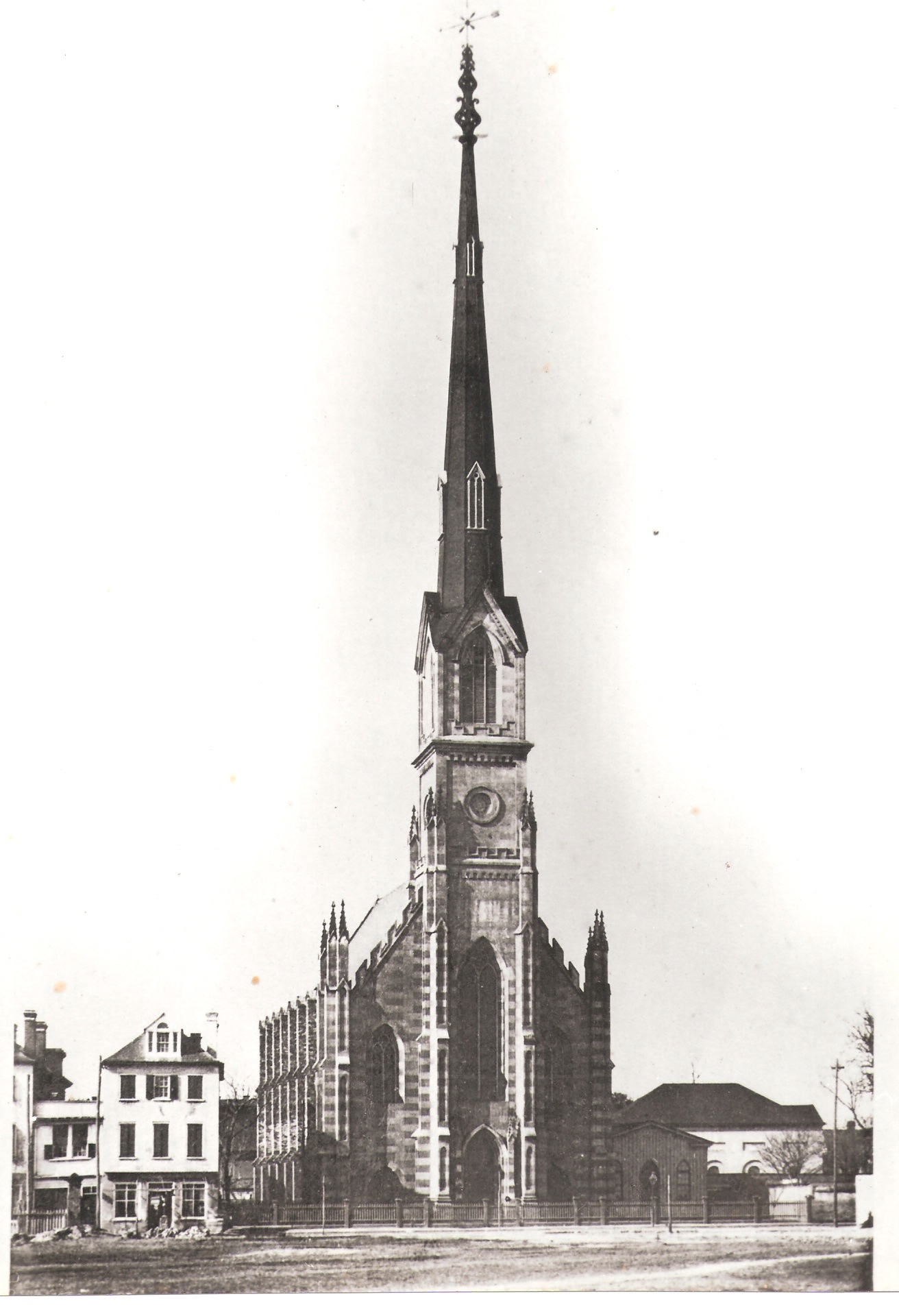
A rare 1883 view of the Christopher Werner finial and ablaq banded exterior finish.

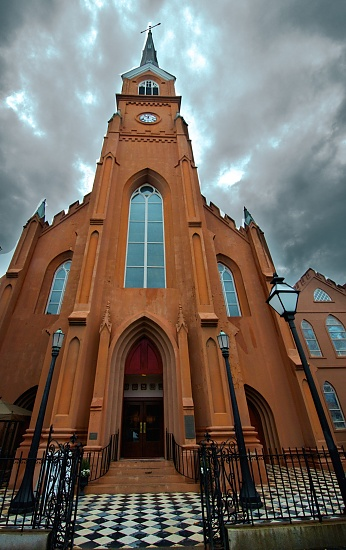
Looking up to the 255' 5/8" tall spire.

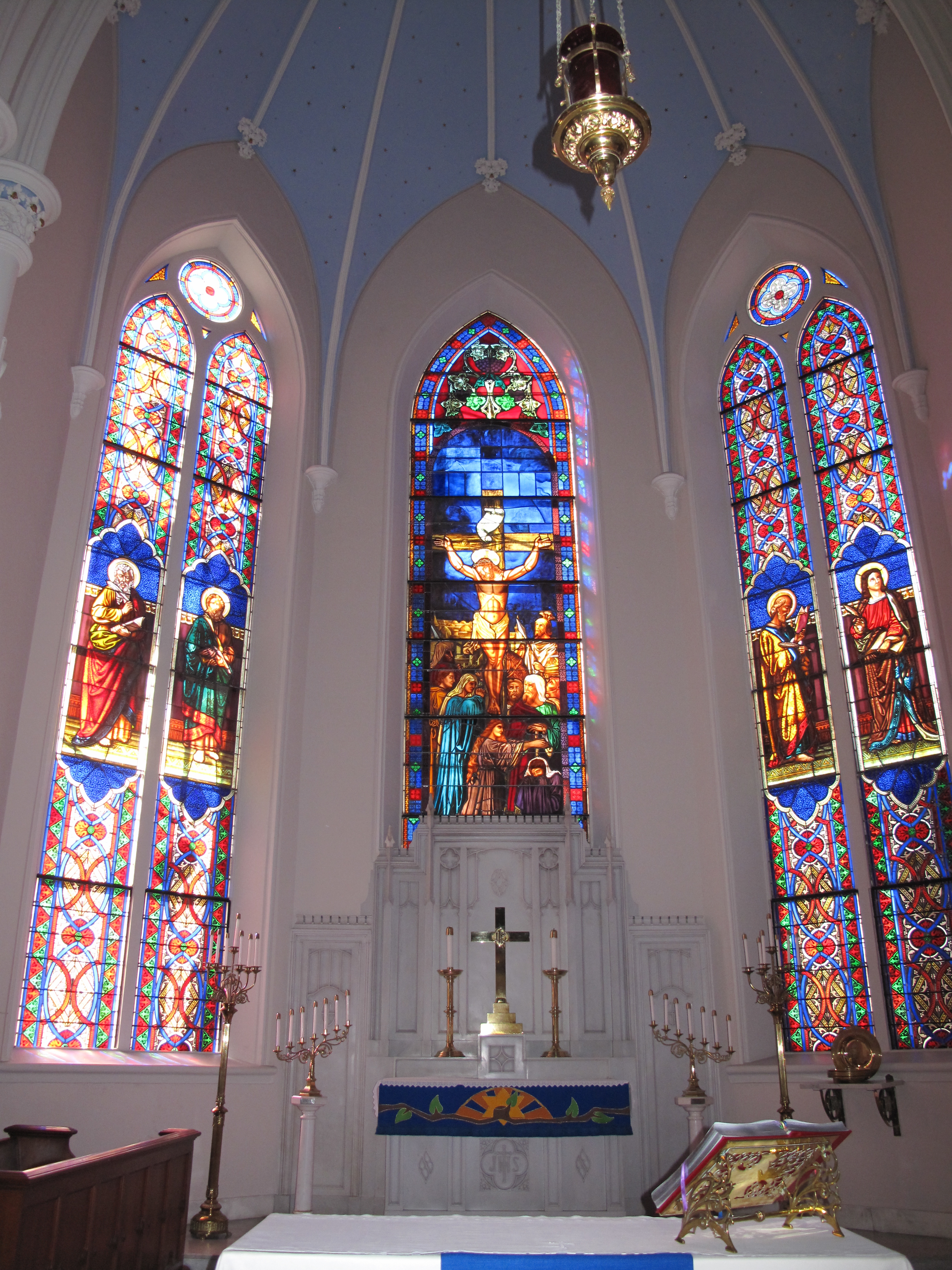
St. Matthew's Chancel

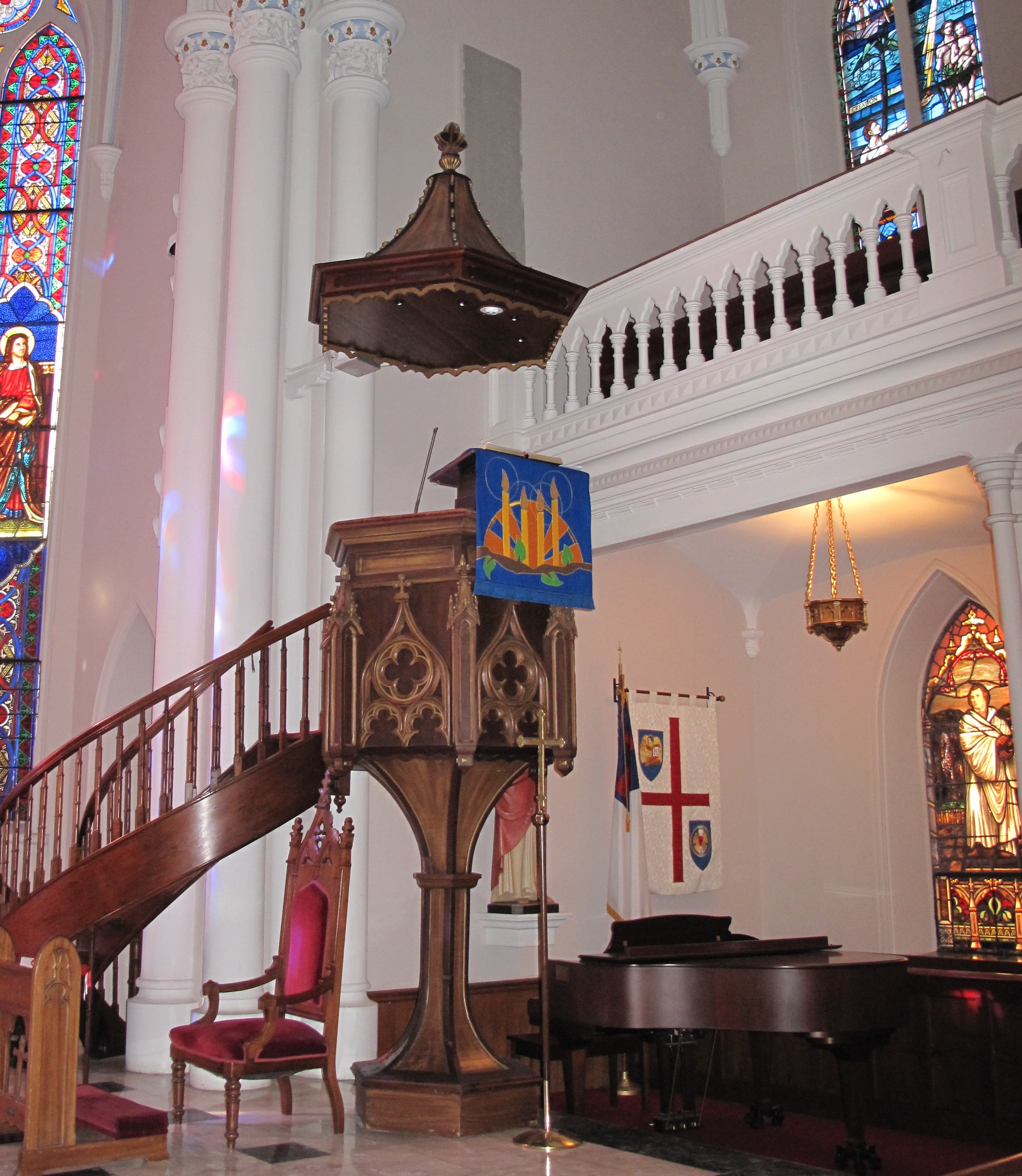
The "wine glass" pulpit and sounding board of 1872 survived the fire of 1965

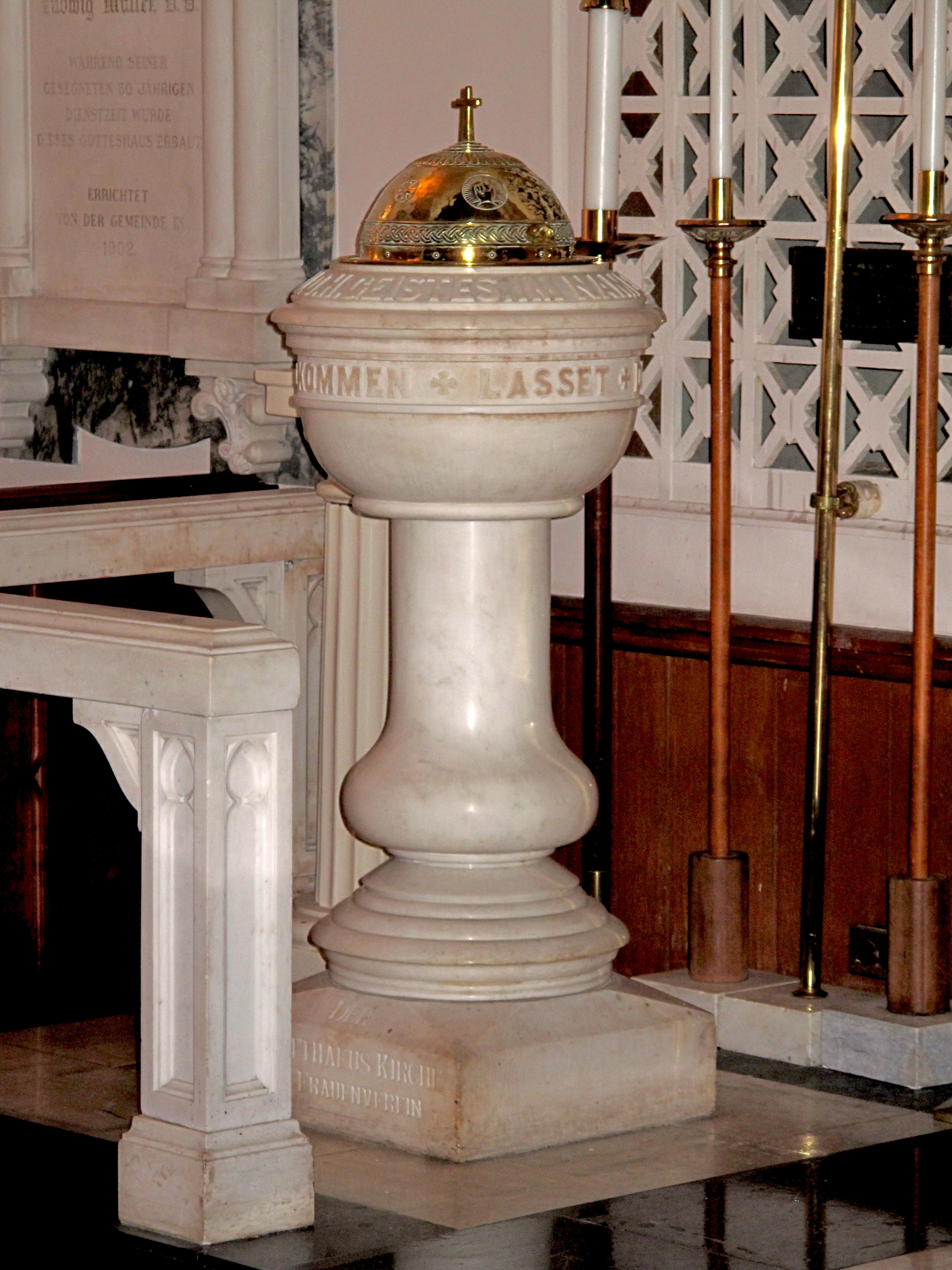
The marble baptism font inscribed in German

== Organs ==
Service Postlude Improvisation
Postlude improvisation of Hyfrydol on the Austin Organ Opus 2465 at St. Matthew's Lutheran Church in Charleston, South Carolina. W. Douglas Ludlum, organist.

=== Gallery organ ===
After the fire of 1965, a new sanctuary instrument by Austin Organs, Inc. was dedicated in 1967. It has 3 manuals, 47 stops, 61 ranks and electropneumatic action. The Austin Organ Opus 2465 stop list:

GREAT (unenclosed): 16 Gemshorn, 8 Principal, 8 Bourdon, 8 Gemshorn (ext), 4 Octave, 4 Spitzflote, 2 Waldflote, II Rauschquint, IV Fourniture, Cymbelstern, Chimes, Gt-Gt 16, 4, Sw-Gt 16, 8, 4, Ch-Gt 16, 8, 4, Pos-Gt 8

SWELL (enclosed): 16 Lieblich Gedackt, 8 Geigen Principal, 8 Hohl Flute, 8 Gamba, 8 Gamba Celeste, 4 Principal, 4 Rohrflote, 2 Flautino, IV Plein Jeu, 16 Contra Fagotto, 8 Fagotto (ext), 4 Clairon, 8 Trumpet, Sw-Sw 16, 4, Ch-Sw 8, Ch-Pos 8

CHOIR (enclosed): 8 Nason Flute, 8 Flauto Dolce, 8 Flute Celeste, 4 Koppelflote, 2 2/3 Nasard, 2 Blockflote, 1 3/5 Tierce, 8 Krummhorn, 8 Bombarde, 8 Trumpet en chamade, Tremulant, Ch-Ch 16, 4, Sw-Ch 16, 8, 4, Gt 8, Pos 8

CHANCEL (enclosed): 8 Gedackt, 8 Viole d'amour, 8 Viole celeste, 4 Principal, 4 Chimney Flute, III Mixture, 8 Trompete, Tremulant, Chancel on Great, Chancel on Choir

POSITIV:8 Suavial, 4 Praestant, 2 Prinzipal, 1 1/3 Larigot, III Cymbel, 4 Schalmei

PEDAL: 32 Resultant (ext), 32 Lieblich Gedackt (electronic), 32 Contra Bombarde (electronic), 16 Principal, 16 Bourdon, 16 Gemshorn (Gt), 16 Lieblich Gedackt (Sw), 16 Flauto Dolce (Ch ext), 8 Octave, 8 Gemshorn (Gt), 8 Gedeckt (ext), 4 Choralbass, III Mixture, 16 Bombarde (Ch ext), 16 Fagotto (Sw), 8 Bombarde (Ch), 4 Krummhorn (Ch), 16 Gedeckt (Chancel), 8 Floete (Chancel), Chimes (Gt), Gt-Ped 8, 4; Sw-Ped 8, 4; Ch-Ped 8, 4; Pos-Ped 8

=== Chapel organ ===
In 2001, St. Matthew's obtained the Ontko Pipe Organ Opus 19a for use in the Education Building Chapel. The organ has 2 manuals, 5 registrations, and 7 ranks with electronic action. The Ontko Opus 19a stop list:

- Manual One: 8 Bourdon, 4 Prestant, 4 Quintaton, 2 Flute a bec, Cymbale III, 8 Trompette
- Manual Two: 8 Quintaton, 4 Flute a Cheminee, 2 Doublette, 1 1/3 Larigot, 8 Trompette, Tremulant
- Pedal: 16 Quintaton, 8 Bourdon, 4 Prestant, 8 Trompette

== Stained glass windows ==
There are noteworthy stained glass windows in the sanctuary. The chancel contains the original 1872 Henry E. Sharp depictions of the Crucifixion and the four Evangelists. In 1912, 12 opalescent memorial windows were installed on the ground floor. These windows have been attributed to the Quaker City Stained Glass Company of Philadelphia. Of special merit are the two full-length windows of Martin Luther and Philipp Melanchthon. During the fire of 1965, sixteen windows in the upper gallery and organ loft were destroyed. Only the window of the Nativity at the rear of the south gallery was not damaged. This original window and its companion replacements, the Annunciation and the Holy Apostles, were products of the Hunt Studios in Pittsburgh. The remaining replacement gallery windows were by the studio of Franz Mayer & Co. of Munich, Germany represented by the studios of George L. Payne of Paterson, New Jersey.
