= Four Corners of Law =

Intersection in Charleston, South Carolina, US

The Four Corners of Law is a term commonly used to refer to the intersection of Meeting and Broad Streets in Charleston, South Carolina. It was coined in the 1930s by Robert Ripley, creator of Ripley's Believe it or Not! and refers to the buildings occupying the four corners of the intersection:

1. St. Michael's Episcopal Church (Charleston, South Carolina), constructed between 1752 and 1761, stands on the southeast corner of the intersection.
2. On the northeast corner of the Four Corners is Charleston City Hall, constructed in the Adamesque style between 1800 and 1804.
3. Across the street, on the northwest corner, stands the Charleston County Courthouse. Originally constructed in 1753 as South Carolina's provincial capital, the building was rebuilt in 1792 for use as a courthouse.
4. On the southwest corner is the United States Post Office and Federal Courthouse, built in 1896.

The term "Four Corners of Law" represents the presence of institutions representing federal, state, local and ecclesiastical law on each corner of the intersection.
