= St. Mary's Episcopal Church (Green Cove Springs, Florida) =

Historic church in Florida, United States

- St. Mary's Church
- U.S. National Register of Historic Places
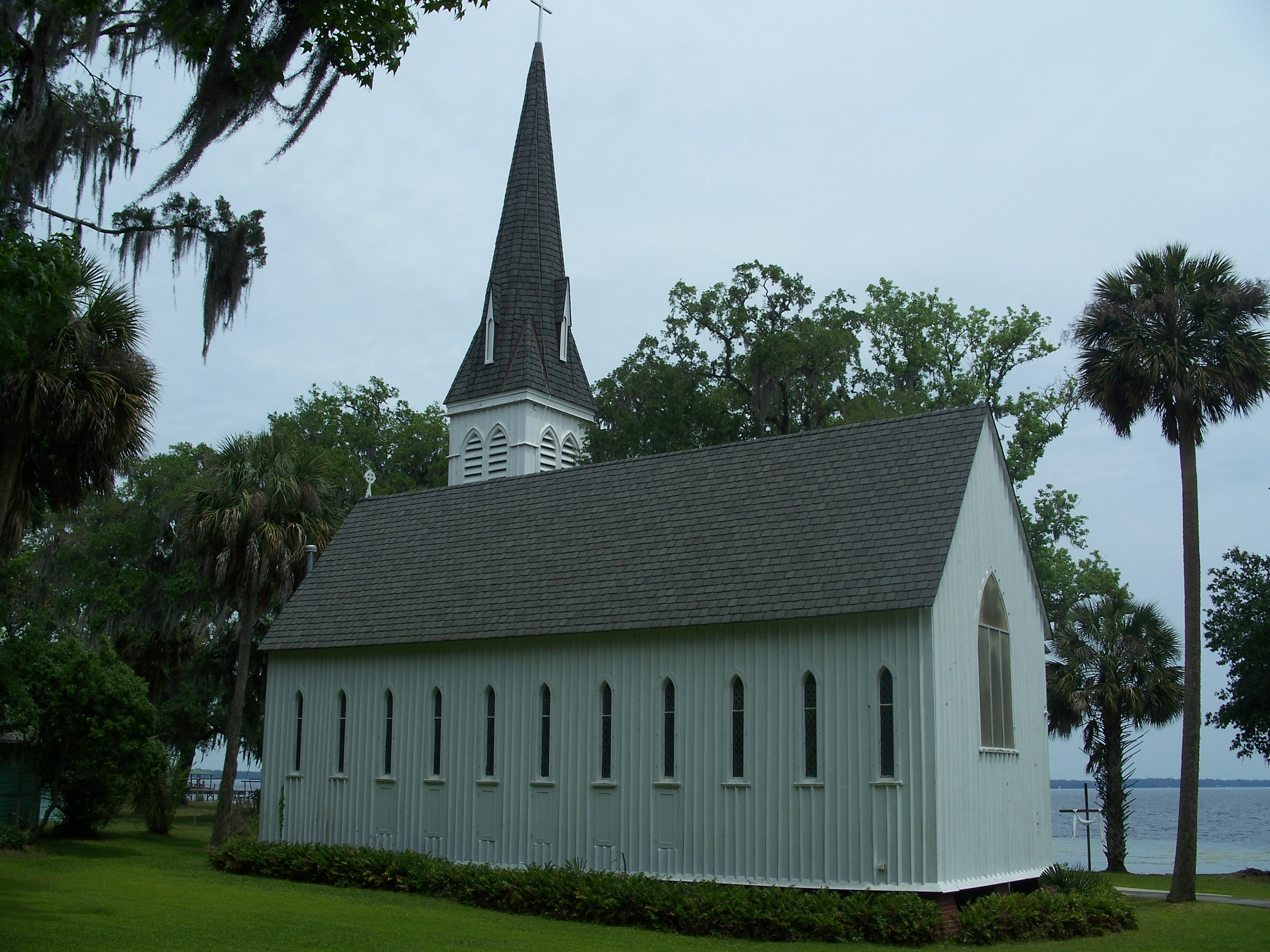

- Location within Florida Location within the United States
- Location: Green Cove Springs, Florida
- Coordinates: 29°59′50″N 81°40′41″W
- Built: 1879
- NRHP reference No.: 78000933
- Added to NRHP: February 17, 1978

St. Mary's Episcopal Church is an historic Carpenter Gothic church located at 400 St. Johns Avenue in Green Cove Springs, Florida. On February 17, 1978, it was added to the U.S. National Register of Historic Places.

== History ==
St. Mary's was organized in 1878 as a mission church of the Episcopal Diocese of Florida. Green Cove Springs was a popular winter resort at the time, and a woman from Boston who spent her winters there wrote to Bishop John Freeman Young asking that a chapel be built to serve the town's seasonal guests.

Winter visitors and year-round residents together raised more than $1,000 to build the church on a donated lot valued at $500. The first service was held on March 10, 1879. The building stands on 3-foot-high piers about 40 feet from the St. Johns River.

== Windows ==
The church's stained-glass windows came from Colgate Studio in New York City, one of the earliest stained-glass studios in the United States. The windows were created by Henry E. Sharp and are among the earliest examples of American-designed and manufactured stained glass in Florida.

The windows cost $1,100 when the church was built. In the windows behind the altar, three beatific women represent the virtues of St. Mary: faith, charity and hope. The angel Gabriel is in the center of the rose window above the altar.

=== Restoration ===
In 2012 parishioners in the 150-member congregation made memorial donations to restore the 18 stained-glass Lancet windows on the east and west sides of the church. The church received a $22,500 state historic preservation grant in 2013 to complete restoration of the windows. The state grant was matched by an anonymous donor.

The restoration will include cleaning the windows, re-stenciling and re-leading them if necessary, and repairing the framework supporting the windows. The stained glass also will be covered in clear Lexan thermoplastic that is resistant to ultraviolet light and is ventilated to reduce moisture and sun damage.

== National Register listing ==
- St. Mary's Church
- added 1978 - Building - #78000933
- St. Johns Ave., Green Cove Springs
- Historic Significance: Event, Architecture/Engineering
- Architect, builder, or engineer: Charles C. Haight, Lewis, Lawrence & Adams
- Architectural Style: Gothic Revival
- Area of Significance: Religion, Exploration/Settlement, Architecture
- Period of Significance: 1875-1899, 1925–1949
- Owner: Private
- Historic Function: Religion
- Historic Sub-function: Religious Structure
- Current Function: Religion
- Current Sub-function: Religious Structure

== See also ==
- National Register of Historic Places listings in Florida
