= Henry E. Sharp =

American stained glass artist

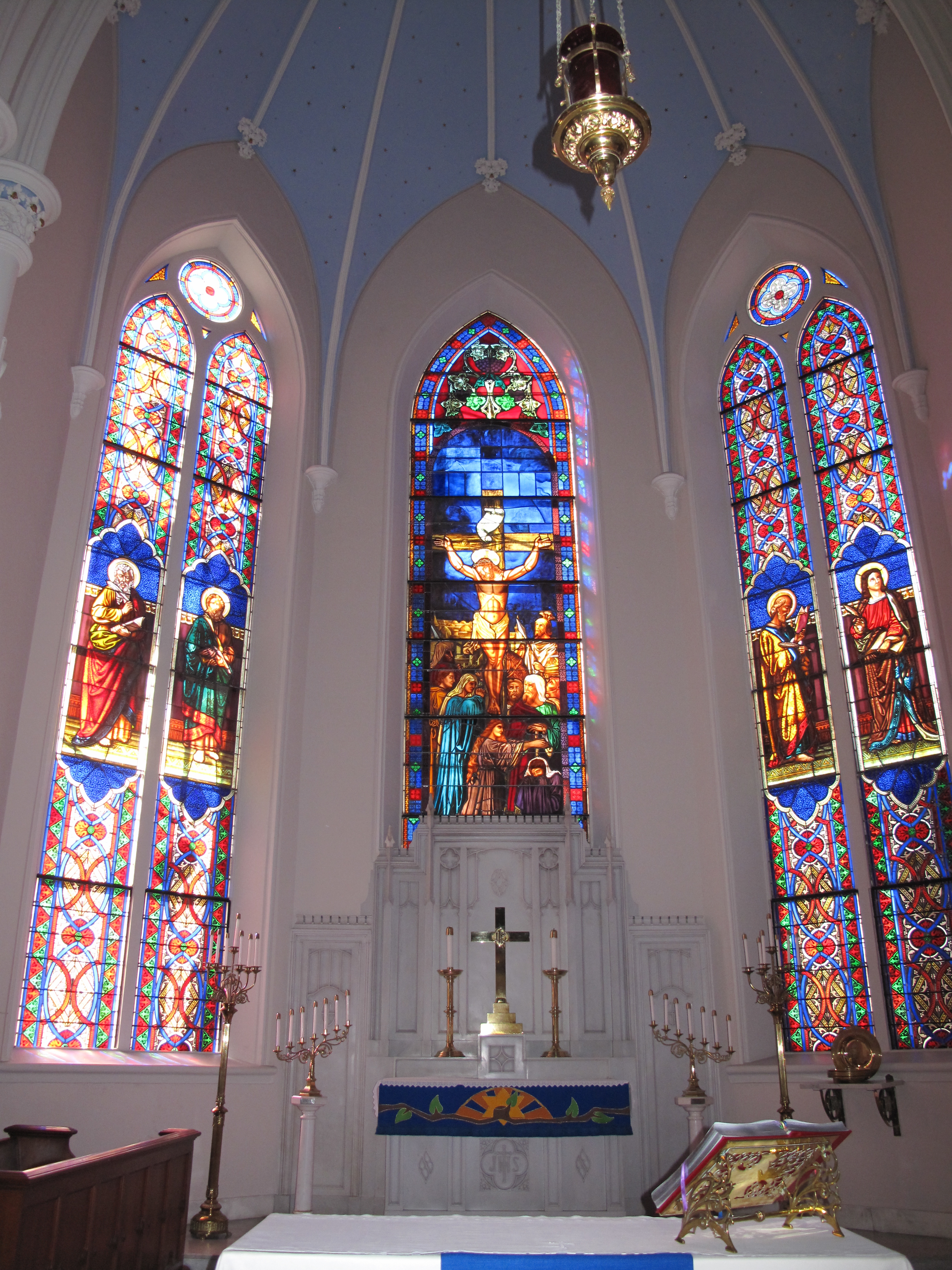
- Henry E. Sharp windows of the "Crucifixion and Four Evangelists" (1872) at St. Matthew's German Evangelical Lutheran Church in Charleston, South Carolina
- Occupations: Stained glass maker and manufacturer

Henry E. Sharp was a nineteenth-century American stained glass maker active with William Steele from c.1850 to c.1897.

Sharp established himself with Steele as a glass stainer at offices at 216 Sixth Avenue.

Beyond New York state, Sharp produced created stained glass windows for churches in Pennsylvania, Connecticut, Rhode Island, Massachusetts, Maine, Ohio, Nebraska, Minnesota, South Carolina, California, the Virgin Islands and Japan.

Like much of the mid-nineteenth-century American stained glass produced in and around Broadway in Manhattan, the stained glass window designs featured full-length painted figures in ornate Gothic canopies, all executed with rich colors.

== List of works ==
- Windows (1867–1868) at St. Ann's Episcopal Church in Brooklyn, New York (Renwick & Sands), now the gymnasium of Packer Collegiate Institute; the window "Faith and Hope" was donated to the Metropolitan Museum of Art and is on permanent display in the American Wing.
- Windows (1868–69) at St. Paul's Episcopal Church in Wallingford, Connecticut.
- Windows (1872) at St. Matthew's German Evangelical Lutheran Church in Charleston, South Carolina. The Henry E. Sharp chancel windows survived the church fire of January 13, 1965.
- Windows (1878) at St. Mary's Episcopal Church in Green Cove Springs, Florida.
- Altar Windows (1868) and Good Shepherd Window (1872) at St. Matthew's Episcopal Church in Hillsborough, North Carolina.
- "Consolation" Window in the middle of the south nave wall, after 1877. Christ Church in Raleigh, North Carolina. Made by Henry E. Sharp & Sons, New York. Two similar windows in the south wall, one nearest the narthex ("Blessed are the pure in heart") and one in the chancel ("Nearer my God to thee"), may also be Sharp windows. All three windows were given by the Battle family within a similar time frame.
- Altar windows (1856), St. Luke's Episcopal Church, Jacksonville, Alabama.
- Windows, (1864–65) Ste. Anne de Detroit, Detroit, Michigan; transferred to new church, 1887.
