= United States Post Office and Courthouse (Charleston, South Carolina) =

Port office and courthouse in Charleston, South Carolina, United States

- U.S. Post Office and Courthouse
- U.S. National Register of Historic Places
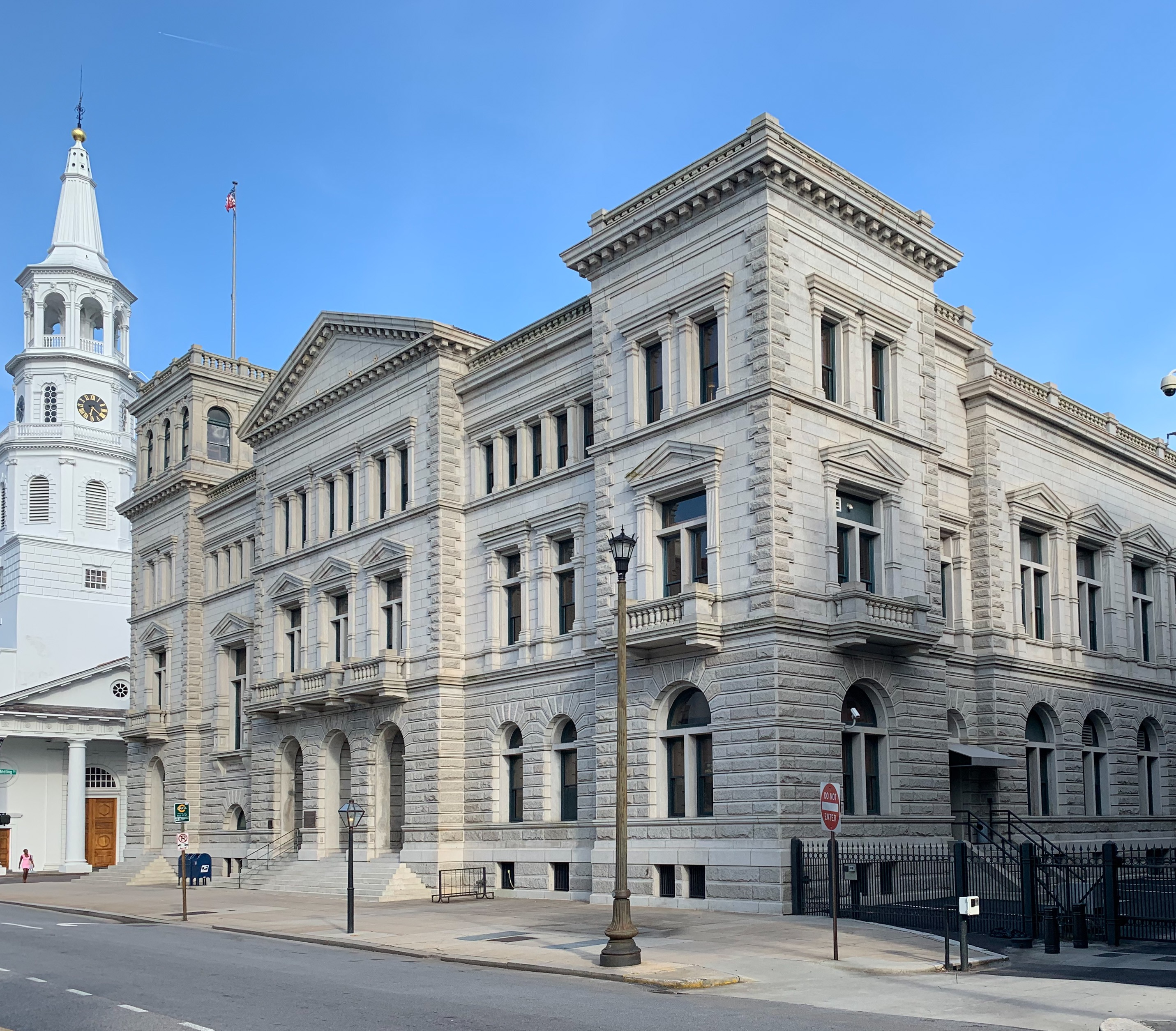
- U.S. Post Office Building in 2019

- Location within South Carolina Location within the United States
- Location: 83 Broad Street; Charleston, South Carolina
- Coordinates: 32°46′33″N 79°55′54″W
- Area: 1.3 acres (0.53 ha)
- Built: 1896
- Architect: John Henry Devereux
- Architectural style: Renaissance Revival
- NRHP reference No.: 74001835
- Added to NRHP: August 13, 1974

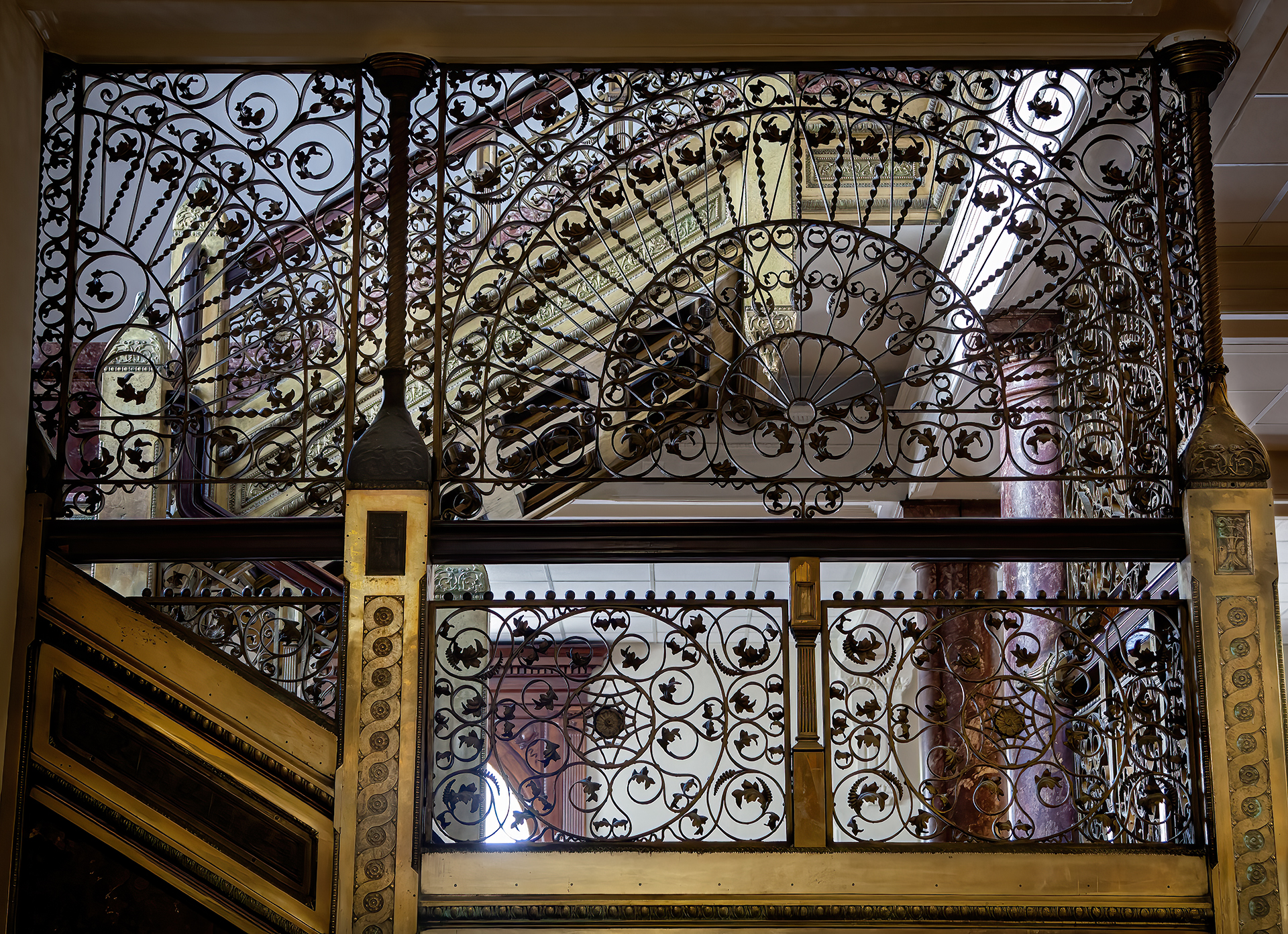
Interior ironwork detail, staircase landing

The U.S. Post Office and Courthouse is a historic post office and courthouse located at Charleston in Charleston County, South Carolina. The building and its annexes serve the federal court for the Charleston Division of the United States District Court for the District of South Carolina. The building was listed on the National Register of Historic Places in 1974.

The building, completed in 1896 in the Renaissance Revival style, was designed by Charleston architect John Henry Devereux using gray granite from Winnsboro, South Carolina. The design includes a square tower, balustraded balconies, rusticated base and quoins, great double doors, and high and broad steps, meant to resemble an Italian Renaissance palace.

== Building history ==
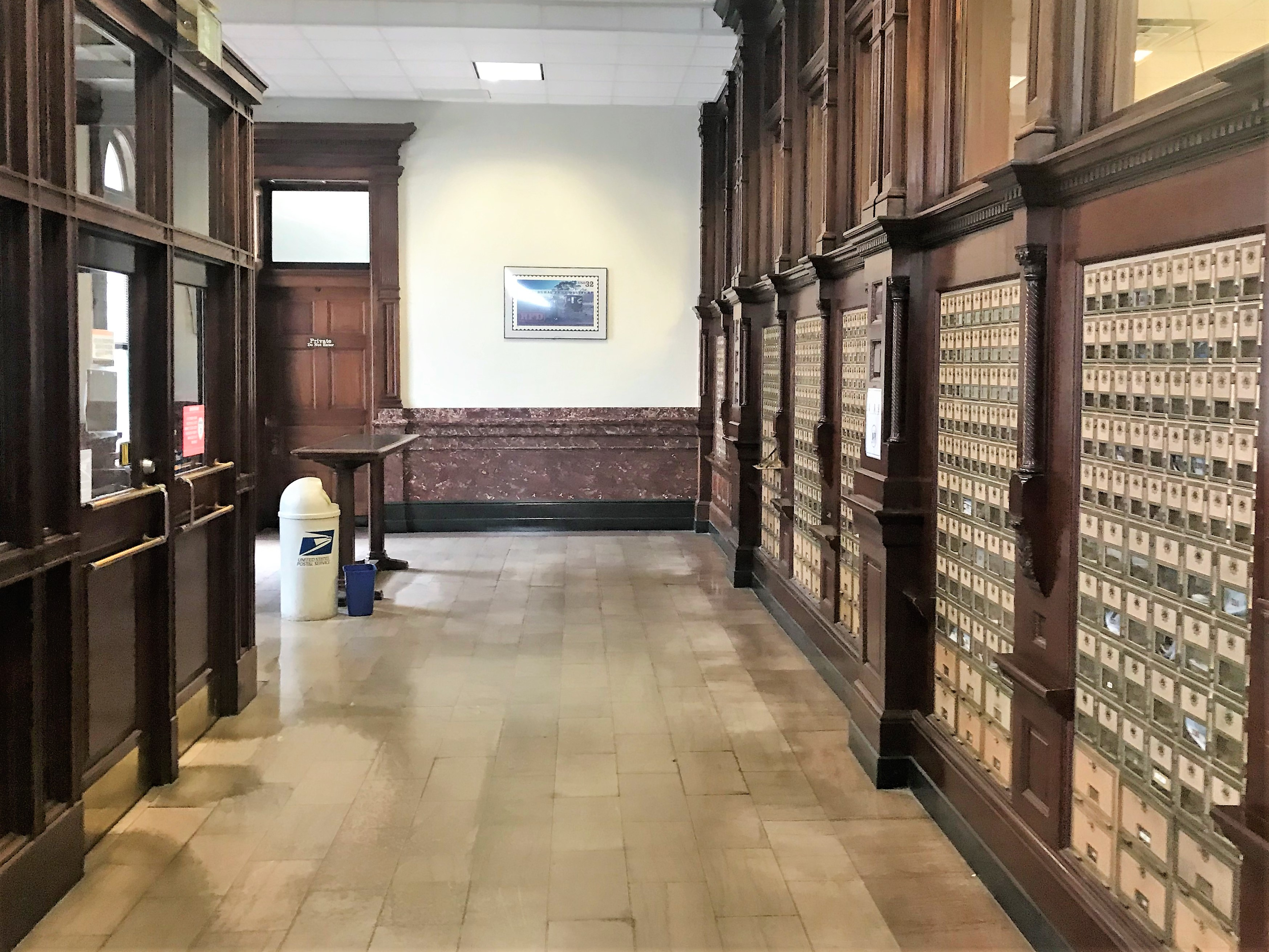
Inside the post office.

The U.S. Post Office and Courthouse in Charleston, South Carolina, is located on the southwest corner of Meeting and Broad streets at the intersection known as the "Four Corners of Law." On the northwest corner, a 1792 courthouse represents the role of county government in Charleston. City Hall, built in 1802 on the northeast corner, symbolizes the presence of municipal government. Finally, St. Michael's Episcopal Church, built between 1752 and 1761, signifies divine law as a component in community life when the Anglican Church was the established church of the community.

The Charleston Post Office is one of the oldest in the United States, having been established by George III in 1740, during the provisional colonial governorship of William Bull.

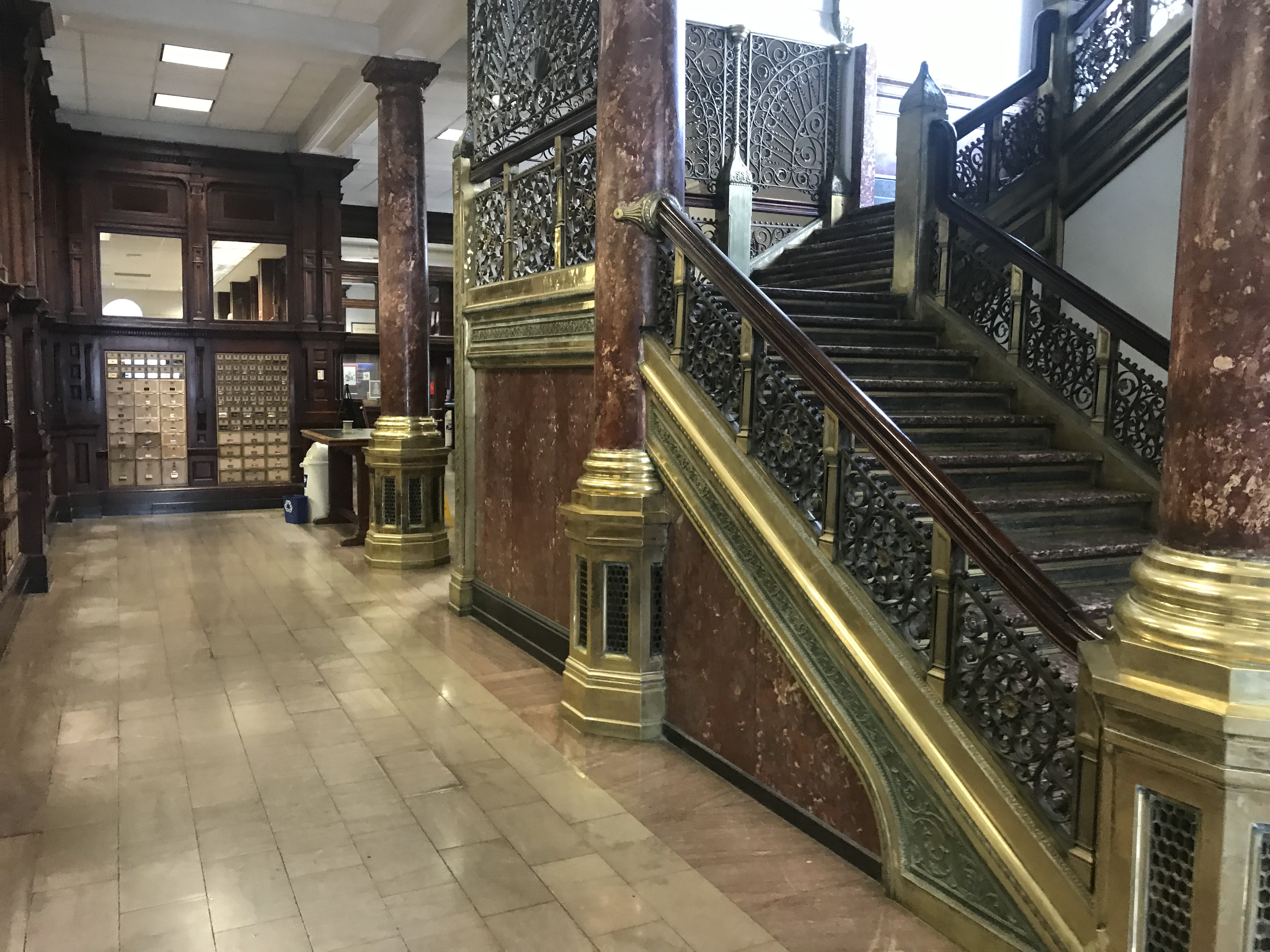
Stair set in the post office.

In 1887, Congress authorized funds for construction of the current post office. South Carolina architect John Henry Devereux designed the building. He had immigrated as a young child with his family from Ireland. He started work as a plasterer and later studied with a leading architect. He became an architect and builder of churches and public buildings in South Carolina's Lowcountry. In 1885, Devereux was appointed as Superintendent of Construction and Repairs of the U.S. Treasury Department, which then managed public buildings. It was in this capacity that he designed the U.S. Post Office and Courthouse. He selected the Second Renaissance Revival style to convey the grandeur associated with public architecture at that time.

Construction of the building was not finished until 1896; a gala viewing complete with a German band took place. Completed for a cost of $500,000, the building is credited with playing an important role in the downtown revitalization of Charleston at the end of the 19th century.

The building was individually listed in the National Register of Historic Places in 1974, and is also within the boundaries of the National Historic Landmark Charleston Historic District.

== Architecture ==
The U.S. Post Office and Courthouse is an excellent example of Second Renaissance Revival architecture. This style conveyed the dignity of government and was often used for civic buildings during the late nineteenth century. Some of the hallmarks of the Renaissance Revival style found on the building include a prominent cornice, balustrades, and quoins (corner blocks). Belt courses, another common feature, encircle the building at each level.

The building is clad in granite quarried from Winnsboro, South Carolina. On the first story, the granite is finished in rock-faced coursed blocks that are slightly darker in tone than the smooth blocks used on the remainder of the building. The quoins also have a rough finish.

Openings on the first story are arched, which is another characteristic of the Second Renaissance Revival style. The second story features rectangular window openings topped with prominent triangular pediments and flanked with pilasters (attached columns). The pilasters are paneled on the bottom, but fluted with parallel, vertical, linear grooves on the top. This pattern continues on pilasters found in the interior lobby. Windows on the third floor are flanked with plain pilasters, but have molded trim above the openings.

Pediments with dentils (square blocks) are centrally located on the top story of the street-front facades. A prominent corner tower that ascends a full story above the rest of the building is located at the confluence of Meeting and Broad Streets. The uppermost story of the tower contains a series of arched windows. The tower is topped with an open balustrade.

The interior contains opulent public spaces, which were restored in 2002. Like the dignified exterior, the interior splendor indicates the importance of public buildings at the end of the nineteenth century. The postal lobby on the first floor appears much as it did when the building opened in 1896. Rich finishes include red Brazilian marble wainscot and floors, and mahogany walls at the sales and box areas. The grand staircase is ornately finished. The same red Brazilian marble is used on the runners and wainscot, but the risers and the railing are ornamented brass. The prominent brass newel posts are topped with finials and connected by mahogany railings. Ornate brass designs with geometric, curvilinear patterns and rosettes are beneath the railings. Massive plaster columns are painted in a faux marble technique to emulate the red marble and rest on hexagonal brass bases. The magnificent effect of these high-quality finishes is distinctive to the Victorian era.

The courtroom on the second floor features many handsome original details, most notably carved woodwork. The room has carved mahogany wainscot and elaborate mahogany window surrounds. A carved mahogany panel with floral and patriotic motifs, including a shield with stars and stripes, is located directly behind the judge's bench. Oil portraits of past U.S. District judges hang on the walls. On the second and third floors, many original wood-panel doors with mahogany pilasters remain.

In 1922, a modest, single-story, gray concrete addition for service functions was added to the south side of the building. The Hollings Judicial Center was also added to the south side in the 1980s.

== Significant events ==
- 1887: Funding for new Federal building authorized
- 1896: Construction completed
- 1922: Addition completed
- 1974: U.S. Post Office and Courthouse listed in the National Register of Historic Places
- 1980s: Hollings Judicial Center added
- 2002: Interior restoration
