= Manigault =

Manigault (variant spelling Manigaud, Manigaut, etc.) is a surname of French origin that derives from West Germanic Managwald (manig "many, much" + wald, walt "power"). It meant "laborer" in Old French too. It is similar to the German surname Manigold / Mangold. Notable people with the surname include:

== People ==
- Arthur Middleton Manigault (1824-1886), Confederate General of the American Civil War
- Earl Manigault (1944–1998), American basketball player
- Edward Middleton Manigault (1887–1922), American Modernist painter
- Elizabeth Wragg Manigault (1736–1773), socialite and wife of Peter Manigault
- Gabriel Manigault (1758–1809), U.S. architect
- Gabriel Manigault (merchant) (1704–1781), U.S. merchant
- Mary Jane Manigault (1913–2010)
- Omarosa Manigault (born 1974), U.S. TV personality
- Peter Manigault (1731–1773), Charleston, South Carolina attorney, plantation owner, and colonial legislator
- Charles Manigault Morris (1820–1895), naval officer in C.S.A. and U.S.A. services

== Characters ==
- Aaron Manigault, and Devar Manigault, fictional characters from the U.S. TV series The Wire

== See also ==
- Joseph Manigault House, in Charleston, South Carolina, USA
