= Elizabeth Wragg Manigault =

Colonial American socialite

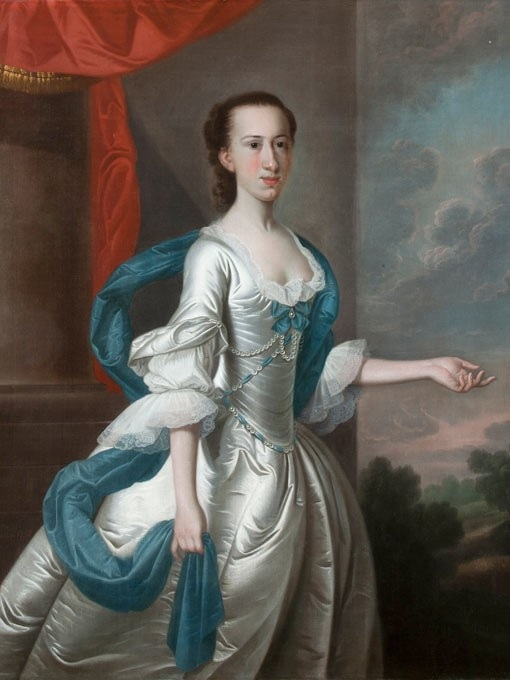
- Manigault by Jeremiah Theus, 1757
- Born: 9 August 1736
- Died: 19 February 1773 (aged 36)
- Resting place: French Huguenot Church, Charleston
- Spouse: Peter Manigault (m. 1755)
- Children: Gabriel, 2 daughters and 1 other son
- Parent(s): Joseph Wragg; Judith DuBose

Elizabeth Wragg Manigault (9 August 1736 – 19 February 1773) was an American socialite who was prominent figure in Colonial South Carolinian society. She was the wife of Peter Manigault, who served as Speaker of the South Carolina House of Representatives and was one of the wealthiest people in British North America.

== Biography ==
Manigault was born on 9 August 1736 to Joseph Wragg and Judith DuBose. Her father, an Englishman of Welsh descent, had immigrated to Charles Town where he pioneered the city's involvement in the Atlantic slave trade. One of the predominant slave traders in British North America, he and his brother were responsible for the importation of around 10,000 enslaved Africans to the Southern Colonies. Manigault's mother was the daughter of Huguenot immigrants. Her maternal grandfather, Jacques DuBose, owned a large plantation near Charles Town. Her sister, Mary, was the wife of the slave trader and statesman Benjamin Smith.

In 1757, she was painted by Jeremiah Theus. The portrait is now on display at the Charleston Museum.

In 1755, she married Peter Manigault, an attorney, planter, and member of the South Carolina House of Commons. Their children included:

- Gabriel Manigault (1758–1809), who married Margaret Izard (1768–1824), a daughter of Continental Congressman and U.S. Senator Ralph Izard.
- Anne Manigault Middleton (1762–1811), who married Thomas Middleton (1753–1797)
- Joseph Manigault (1763–1843), who married Charlotte Drayton (1781–1855)
- Henrietta Manigault Heyward (1769–1827), who married Nathaniel Heyward (1766–1851).

Her husband was later elected as Speaker of the House of Commons.

== Death and legacy ==
She died on February 19, 1773. She is buried at the French Huguenot Church. Elizabeth Street in Wraggborough is named after her.
