= Jeremiah Theus =

Swiss-American portrait painter

- Born: Jeremiah Theüs; April 5, 1716; Chur, Switzerland
- Died: May 17, 1774 (aged 58); Charleston, South Carolina
- Education: unknown
- Known for: Painting
- Notable work: in museums: National Portrait Gallery (United States); Metropolitan Museum of Art; Gibbes Museum of Art; Museum of Early Southern Decorative Arts; Brooklyn Museum of Art; Worcester Art Museum; Reynolda House Museum of American Art; and many others
- Movement: Rococo
- Patrons: much of Charleston society

Jeremiah Theus (né Theüs; April 5, 1716 – May 17, 1774) was a Swiss-born American painter, primarily of portraits. He was active mainly around Charleston, South Carolina, in which city he remained almost without competition for the bulk of his career.

== Life ==
=== Early life and career ===
Jeremiah Theüs was born in the city of Chur, in the Swiss canton of Graubünden, the eldest child of Simeon and Anna Walser Theüs. He was nineteen when he immigrated with his family to the Province of South Carolina, whose General Assembly had provided land grants and transport funds to encourage European Protestants to settle in the colony. Simeon Theüs was given 250 acres (1.0 km^{2}) of land along the Edisto River in what was then Orangeburgh Township, today Orangeburg County.

By 1740, the younger Theus was in Charleston, advertising in the South Carolina Gazette:

Notice is hereby given, that Jeremiah Theus Limner is remov’d into the Market Square near Mr. John Laurans Sadler, where all Gentlemen and Ladies may have their Pictures drawn, likewise Landskips of all Sizes, Crests, and Coats of Arms for Coaches or Chaises. Likewise for the Conveniency of those who live in the Country, he is willing to wait on them at their respective Plantations.

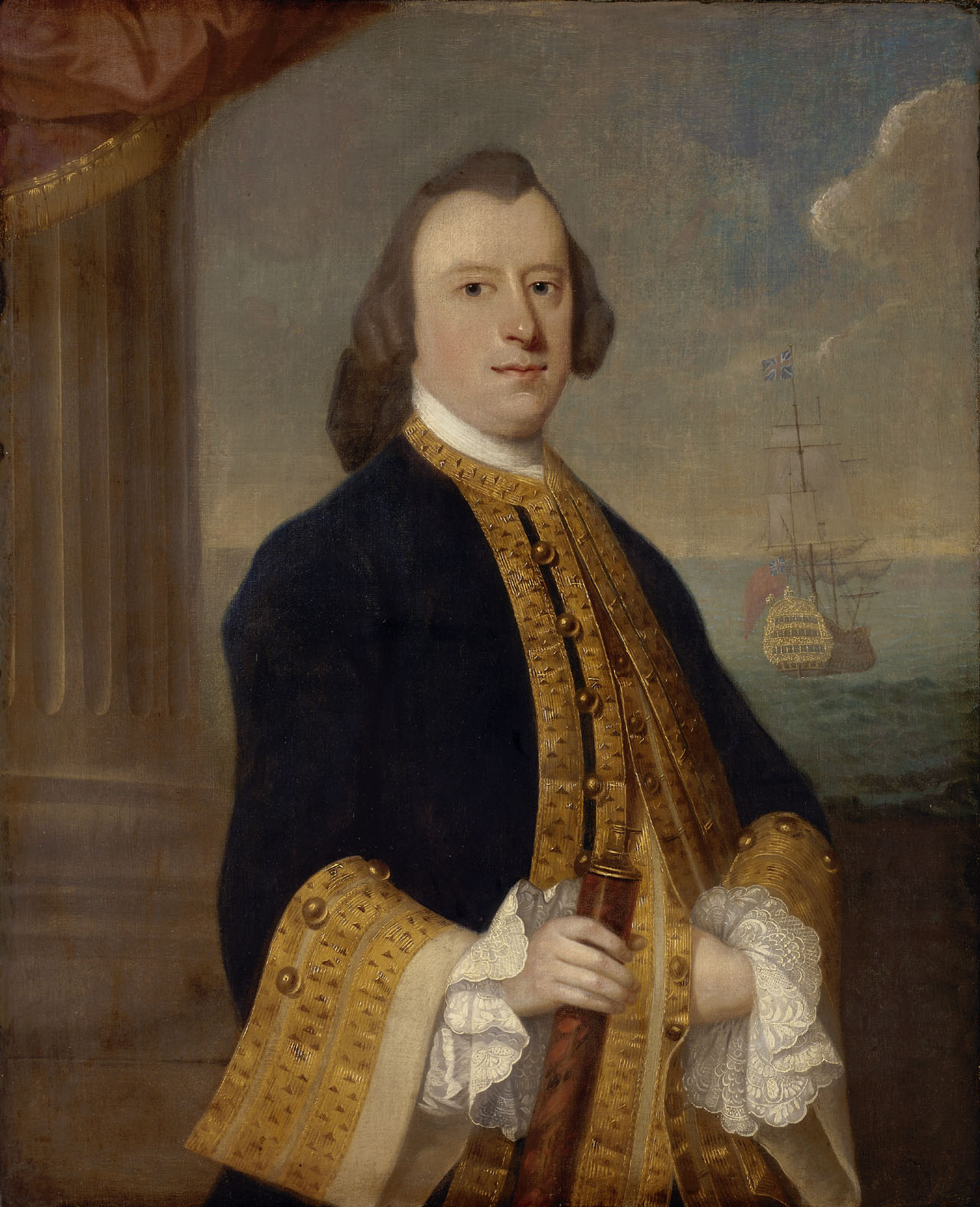
Captain John Reynolds (1754–1758)

He established his studio in a central location, the northeast corner of Broad and Meeting Streets. Just what degree of training he received is unknown; given that opportunities to study art were limited in Charleston at the time, however, it seems likely that he had received some training while he was still in Switzerland. Theus was twenty-eight in 1744, yet he already felt confident enough in his abilities to open an evening drawing school in his home.

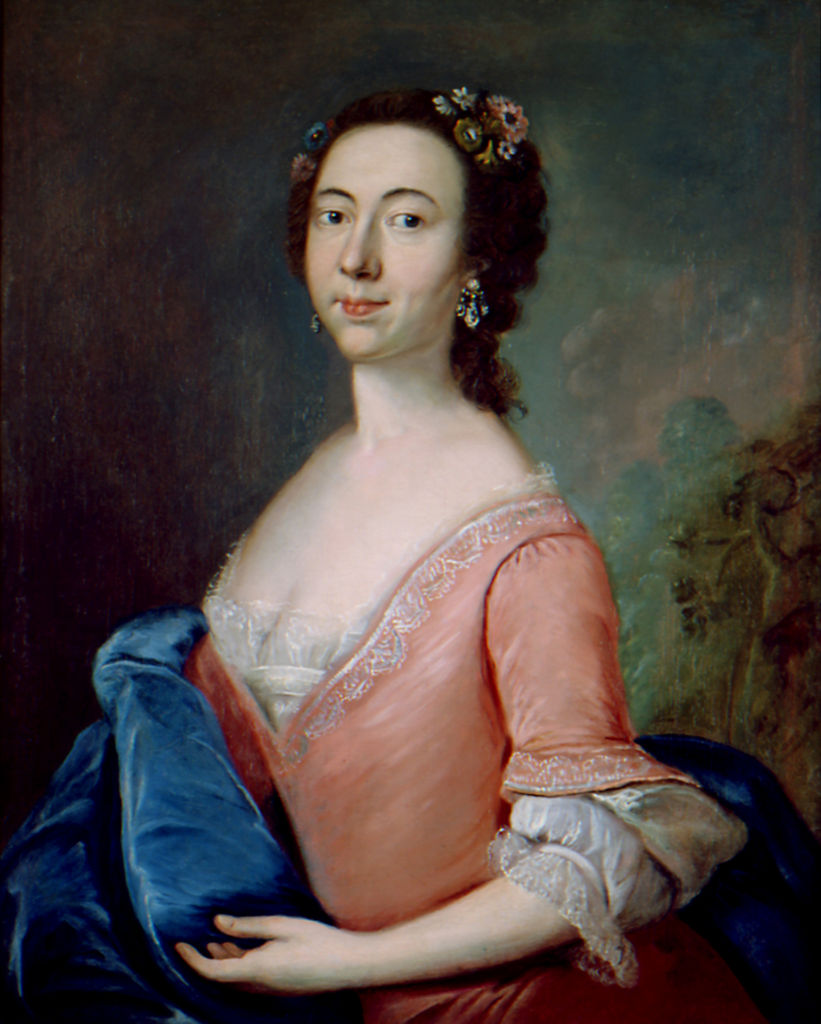
Portrait of Suzanna Moore Smyth, 1755. San Antonio Museum of Art

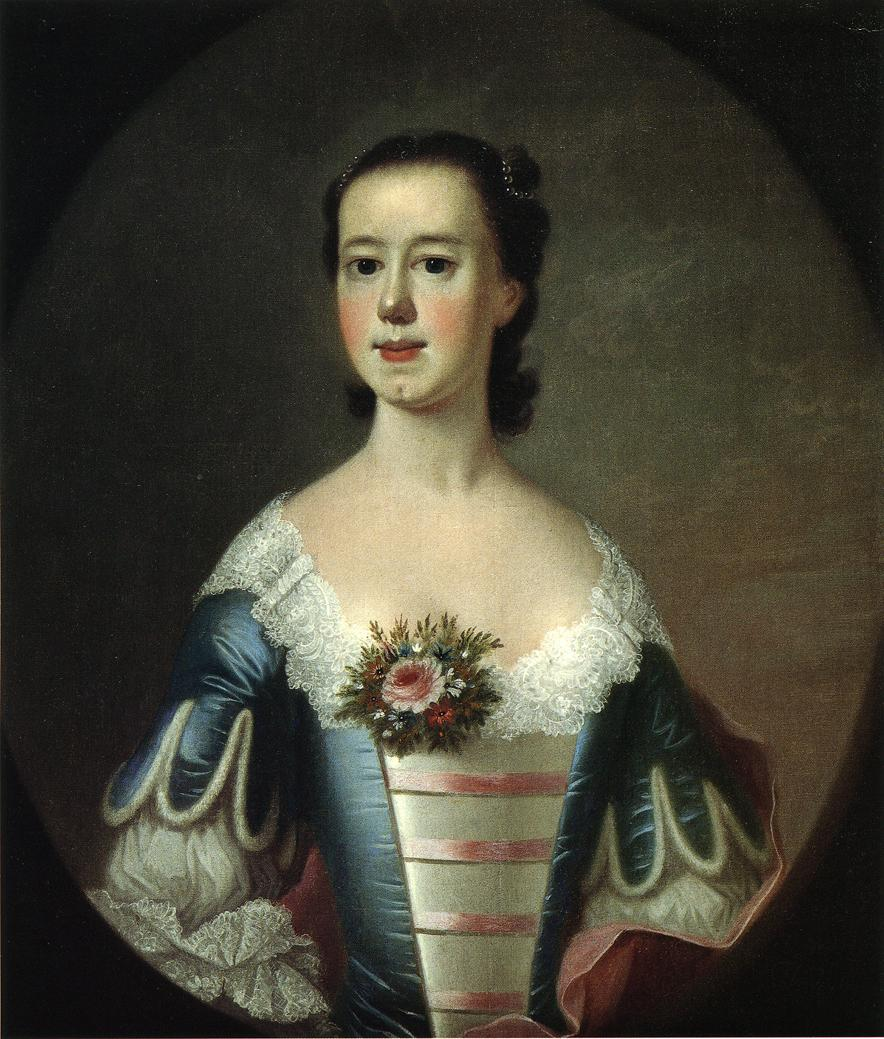
Mrs Thomas Lynch, 1755, Reynolda House Museum of American Art

Theus took on a variety of commissions during his early career, including painting and guilding the steeple of St. Michael's Episcopal Church in 1756, a job for which the congregation's commissioners paid him 77 pounds and 10 shillings for his labor and supplies. He also painted the weather vane, and contributed 50 pounds towards the building fund for a new structure; he later owned a pew in the church.

=== Later years ===
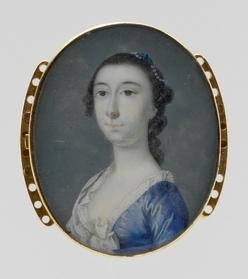
Mrs. Jacob Motte (Rebecca Brewton), c. 1758, watercolor on ivory, in the Metropolitan Museum of Art

Theus was able to build a highly successful practice for himself in the three decades he spent in Charleston; this was due largely to the fact that for much of that time he was the only painter in town with any significant reputation. Perhaps his greatest competition came from English-born and -trained John Wollaston, who visited the city in 1765 and remained for about two years before returning to England. It seems likely that the latter painter influenced Theus to some extent; among the decorative touches he preferred for his work were dresses trimmed with ermine, for his female sitters, and a marble tabletop, both of which began appearing in portraits by Theus at about the time Wollaston was in Charleston. The very end of his career also saw the rise to popularity of Philadelphia-born Henry Benbridge, who had received training in Italy and had migrated to South Carolina not long after his return home; he would soon replace Theus as the most popular painter in the city.

Theus died in Charleston in 1774; his death was noted in at least three local papers, including The South-Carolina and American General Gazette and the South Carolina Gazette, both of which referred to him in their obituary notices as both "ingenious" and "honest". His will is dated September 15, 1770, with a codicil added on March 14, 1774, and directs that his paintings, prints, paints, and books should be sold to provide support for his family. At the estate sale, one Edward Oats purchased ""a great many PORTRAITS of Men, Women, and Children" with the intent of finding interested buyers for the set; whether or not he was able to sell the paintings off is unknown. The will reveals how successful Theus was in his chosen profession; besides holding nearly 3,000 pounds in cash, he owned a house in Charleston, 200 acres (0.81 km^{2}) of land in Orangeburg County, a town lot in Orangeburgh, and seven slaves. He had also, before his death, given 2,100 pounds to the children of his first marriage.

=== Personal life ===
Theus married twice during his time in Charleston. His first wife, whom he wed on January 13, 1741, was Cathrina Elizabeth Shaumlöffel, daughter of one John Shaumlöffel of Orangeburgh Township; she was just 17 at the time of the wedding. The couple would go on to have five children together. Cathrina died in 1754 while giving birth to the sixth, who died at birth. In the following year, Theus married again, this time to a widow named Eva Rosanna Hilt. The wedding likely took place around September, because in that month the artist purchased a brick house at the corner of Mazyck (today Logan) and Broad Streets in Charleston. The pair would have four children.

== Work ==
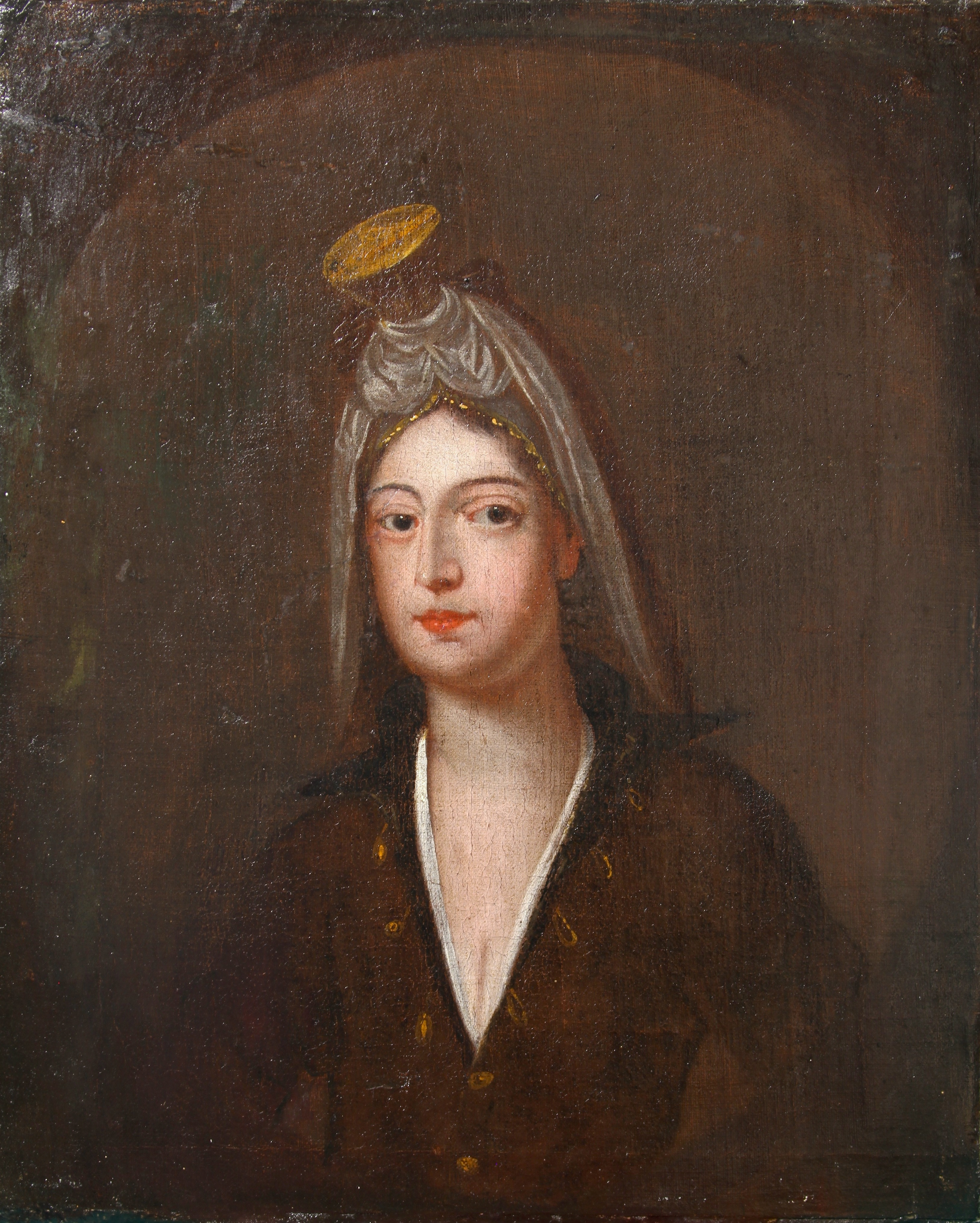
Elizabeth Theus 1742-1797, age 23, first child of Theus and Elizabeth Shaumloffel wearing a musket & powder horn crown and colonial militia outfit.

Theus typically confined himself to uncomplicated compositions, and the bulk of his portraits are bust-length works, approximately thirty by twenty-five inches at their largest; like many portraitists of the era, he also produced miniatures. Three larger-scale works by him exist. The first, a portrait of Elizabeth, wife of Peter Manigault, dates to 1757, and was meant to be the pendant to a portrait by Allan Ramsay. That Manigault was familiar with Theus' work may be seen by the letter he wrote to his mother, which accompanied the Ramsay portrait home in April 1751, in which he wrote that "I desire Mr Theus may see it, as soon as convenient after it arrives....I’ll be extremely obliged to you, if you’ll let me know his Judgement..." The source of Mrs. Manigault's pose is unknown, but is believed to have been taken from an English mezzotint, as was common at the time.

Only once more in his career did Theus work on such a scale, producing a pair of portraits, of Barnard Elliott, Jr. and his wife, around 1766. Elements of the portrait of Mrs. Elliott – including details of her costume, jewelry, and pose – have since been shown to have been taken from a number of contemporary English mezzotints. Theus frequently borrowed from English prints for his smaller works as well, and at least one historian has noted that many of his female sitters share identical poses and elements of costume, down to the folds and shadows in their dresses; each work is individualized with minor changes to various details.

Male sitters in Theus portraits were typically offered a handful of poses to choose from, including the then-popular hand-in-waistcoat gesture; sometimes the artist would include a hat, tucked under the sitter's arm, to provide variety. In other portraits, Theus preferred the shorter bust-length portrait type; in either case, the format chosen allowed him to avoid having to paint the subject's hands.

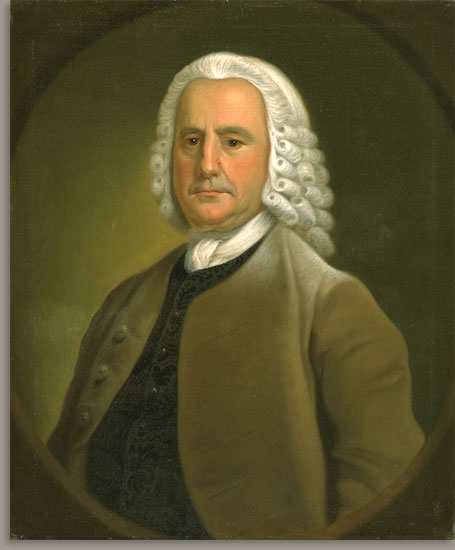
Portrait of a Man (Probably Isaac Holmes), 1755, oil on canvas, in the Worcester Art Museum

Portraits of children allowed Theus greater variety in choosing the sitters' poses, and he exercised this freedom in a number of works. In some, he chose to use a landscape background, rather than the plain backdrop reserved for his adult subjects; others are allotted a variety of props, including a fishing line and hook, an acorn and a pet squirrel, or a piece of fruit. About twenty portraits of children by the artist exist.

Besides creating original work, Theus sometimes served as a copyist for his clients, although few of his surviving works have been demonstrated to be copies. Among these are a copy of a portrait of Christiana Broughton by Henrietta Johnston and a copy of a work variously attributed to William Keable and John Wollaston. Two nearly identical portraits of a man, possibly Isaac Smith, are also known to be by Theus; they appear to be copies of a lost original.

Although Theus made some attempt to individualize the faces of his sitters, they share so many characteristics as to be nearly indistinguishable. Hallmarks of his style include close-set eyes, long noses, full lips, and dimpled chins. There is some evidence that he attempted to work from life when painting his subjects' faces, adding details of costume later in his studio. Costume remains the dominant focus of most of his portraits; he took greater care in depicting the colorful details and trimming of clothing than in showing his sitters' faces.

Theus did not confine himself to portraiture when it came to his art. His advertisement in the Gazette indicates that he was willing to paint landscapes and decorative work, including coats of arms and family crests, in addition to human subjects. That he accepted the commission to paint and gild the steeple of St. Michael's Church suggests, furthermore, that he thought of himself at least in part as a journeyman.

Today paintings by Theus can be found in a number of American museum collections, including Brooklyn Museum of Art, Worcester Art Museum, Gibbes Museum of Art, Telfair Academy of Arts and Sciences, Charleston Museum, Metropolitan Museum of Art, National Gallery of Art, and the Museum of Fine Arts, Boston.

== Portrait gallery ==
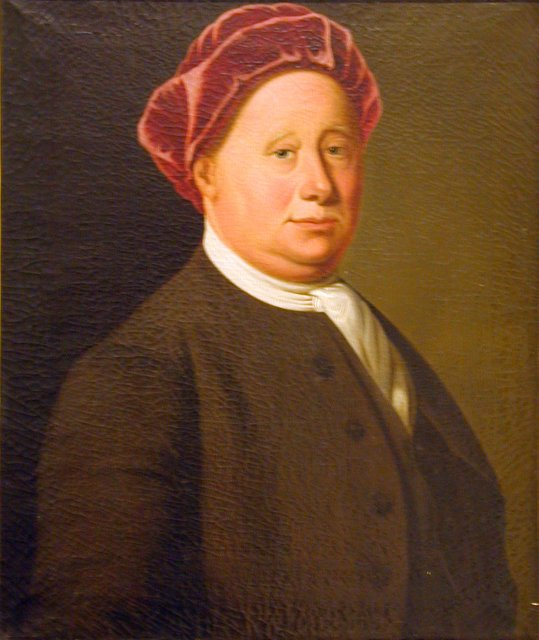
Elias Ball, 1740, Gibbes Museum of Art.

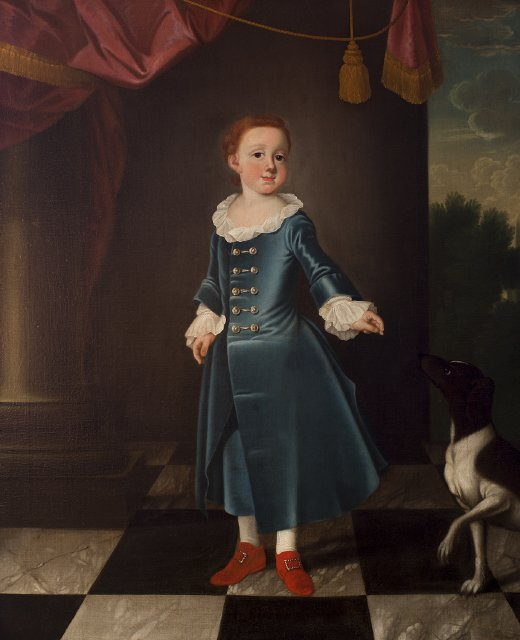
Maurice Keating, 1753, Gibbes Museum of Art.

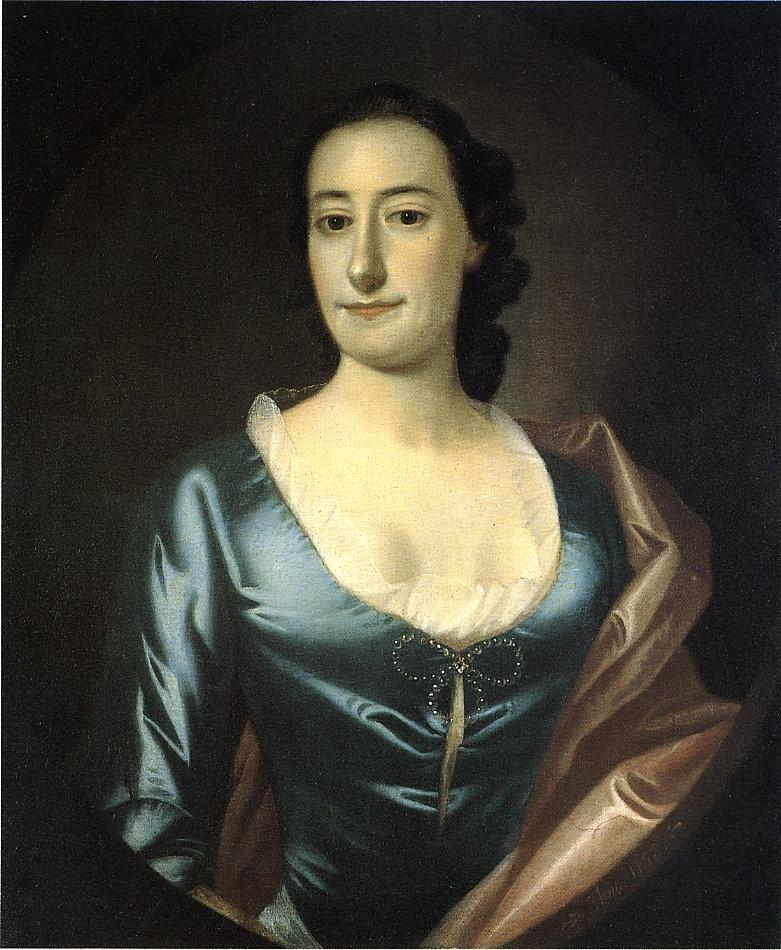
Elizabeth Prioleau Roupell, 1753, High Museum of Art.

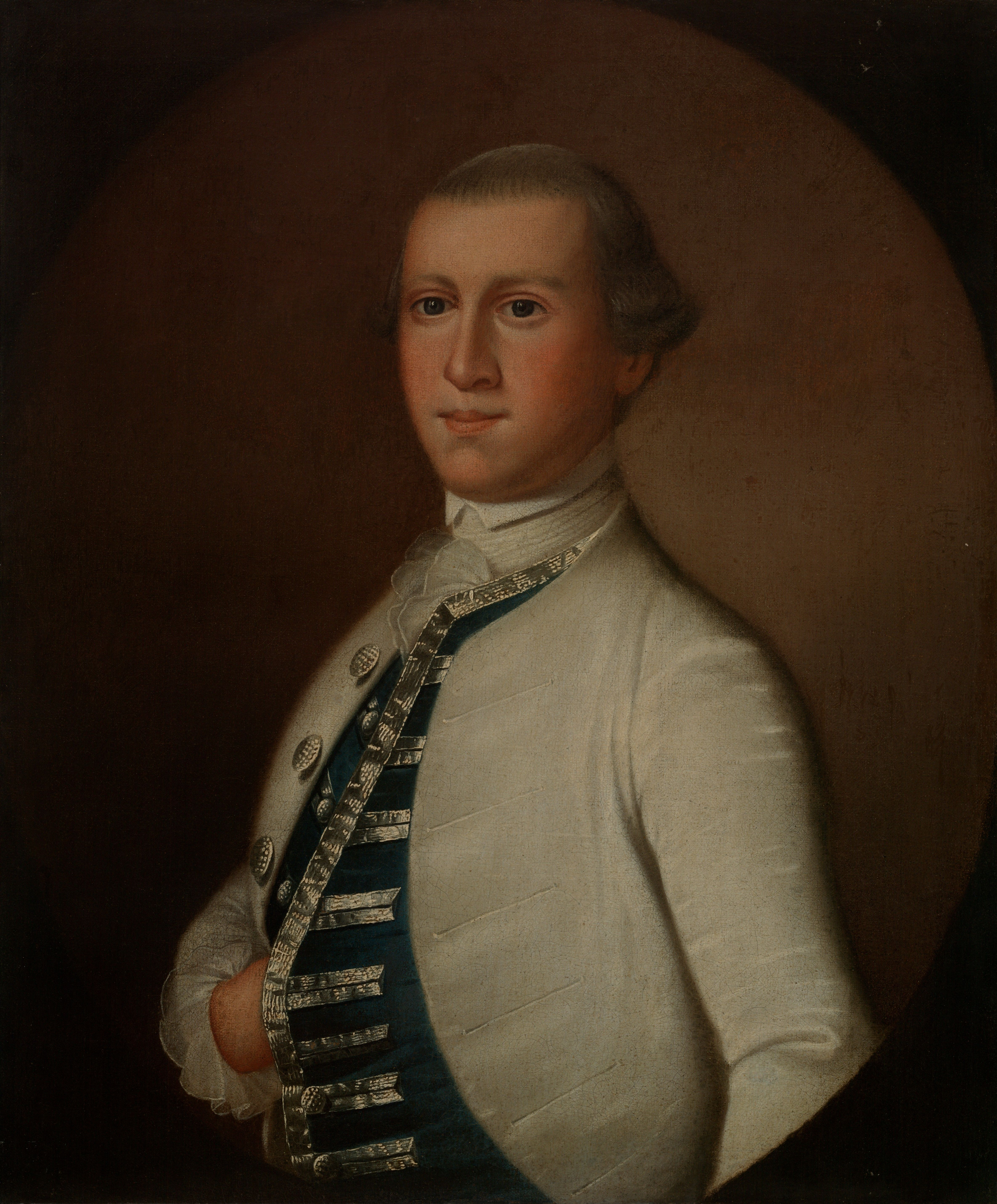
Captain William Richardson, c. 1755-60, Yale University Art Gallery.

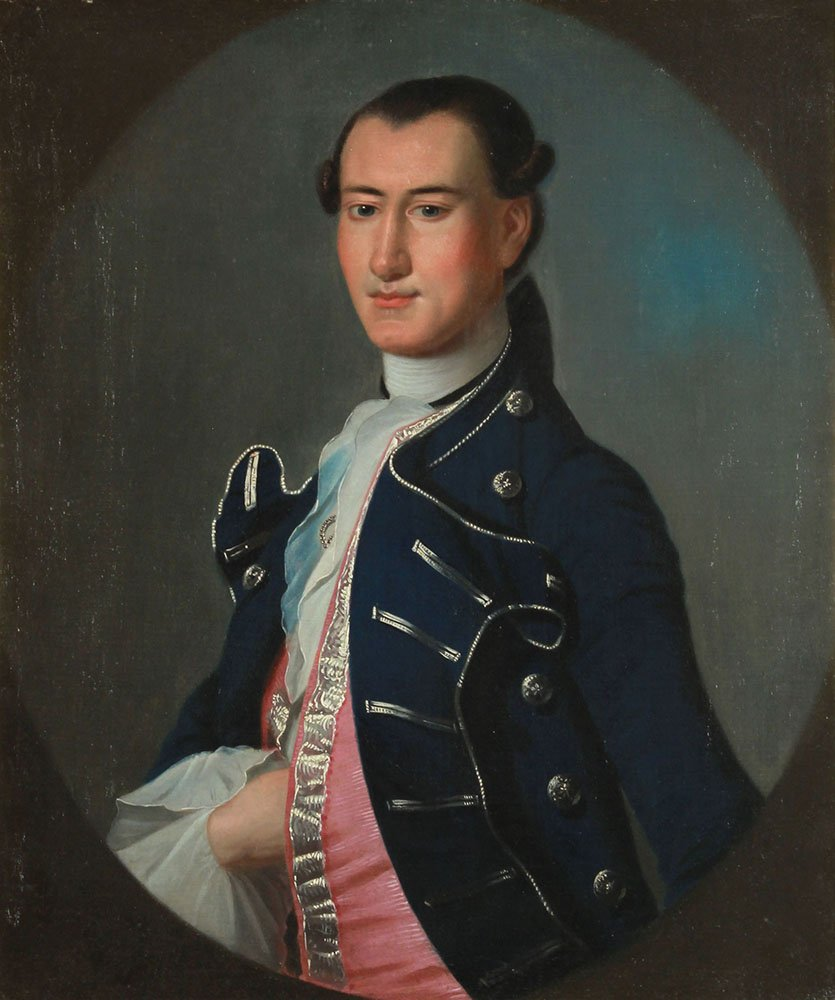
Col. Daniel Horry, 1757, Columbus Museum.

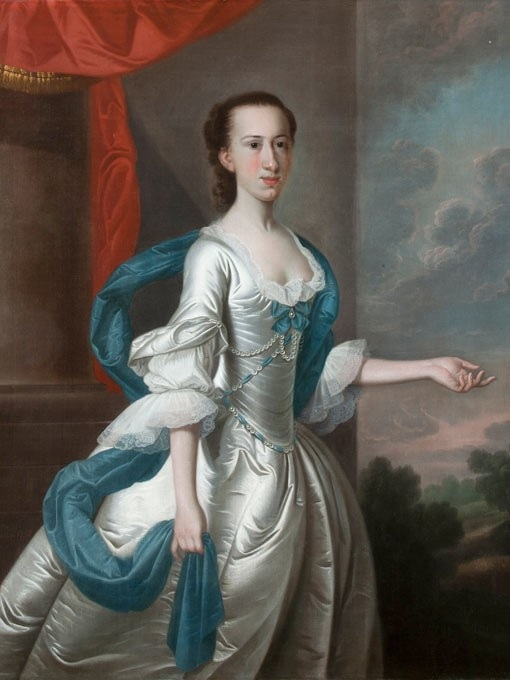
Mrs. Peter Manigault (Elizabeth Wragg), 1757, Charleston Museum.

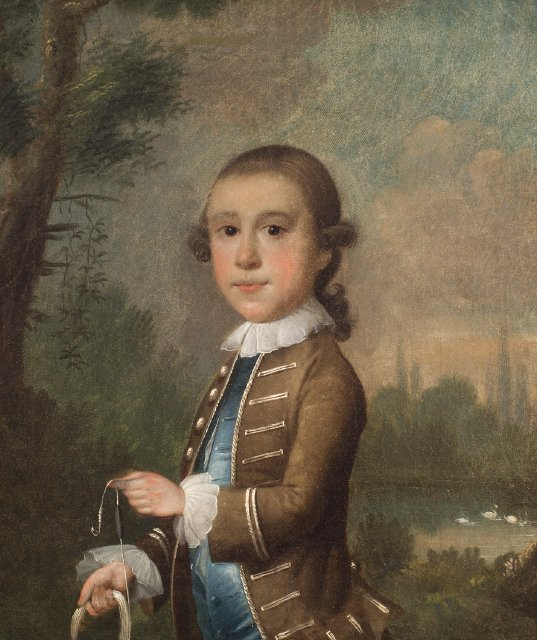
Barnard Elliott, Jr., 1750, Gibbes Museum of Art.

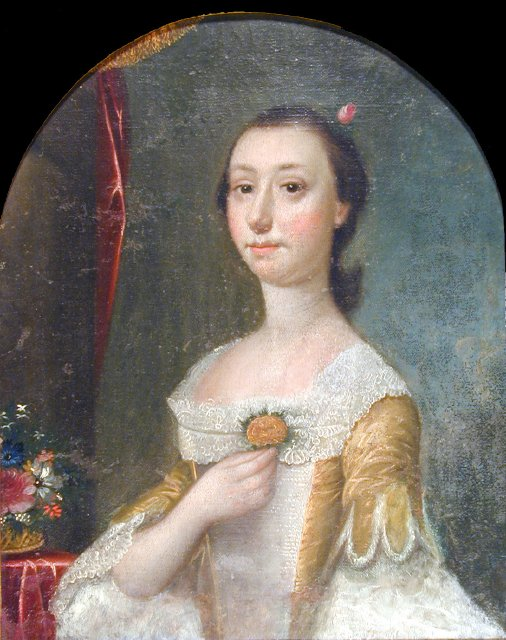
Judith Elliott (Mrs. Francis Villepontoux), 1755, Gibbes Museum of Art.

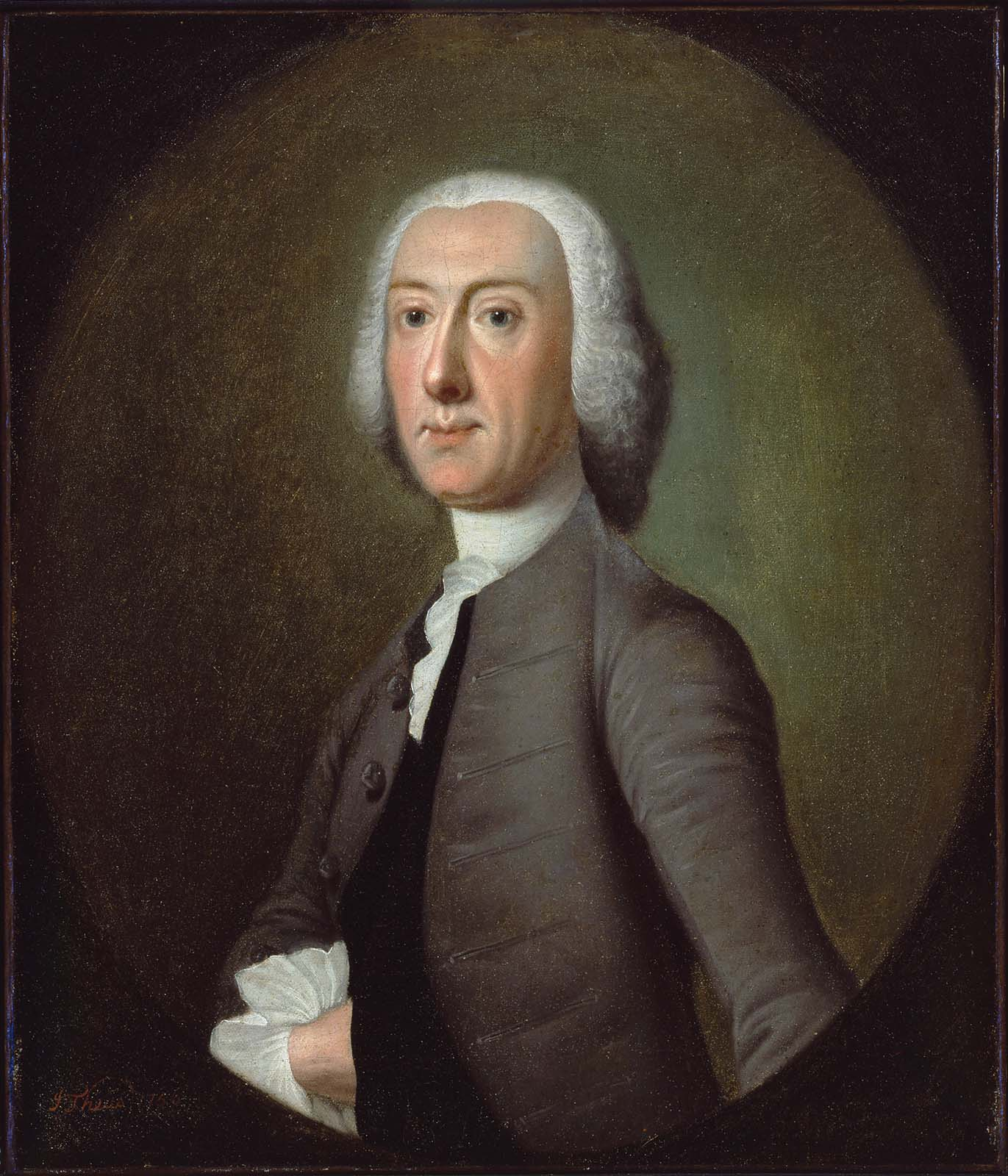
Dr. Lionel Chalmers, 1756, Museum of Fine Arts, Boston.

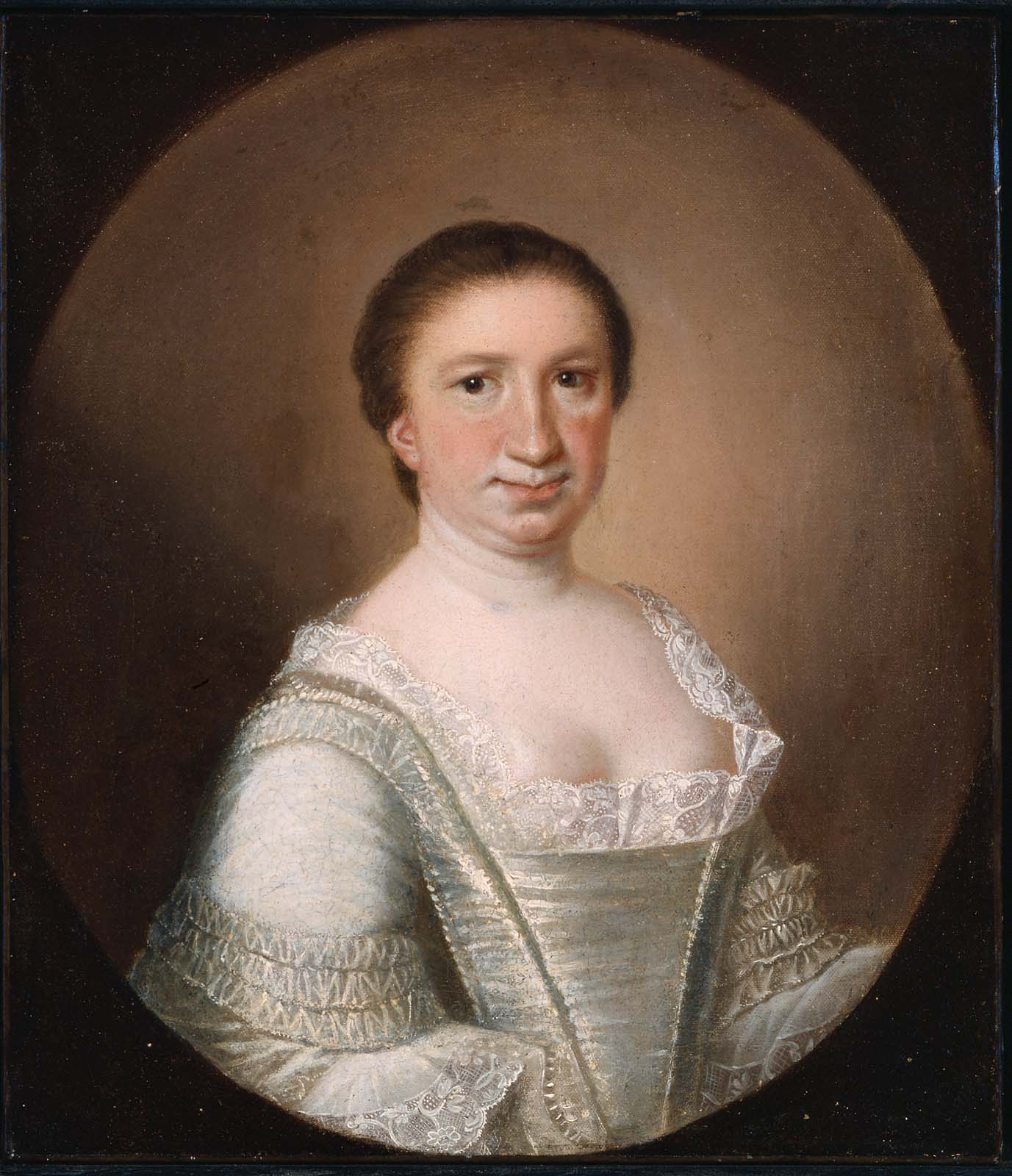
Mrs. Lionel Chalmers (Martha Logan), 1756, Museum of Fine Arts, Boston.

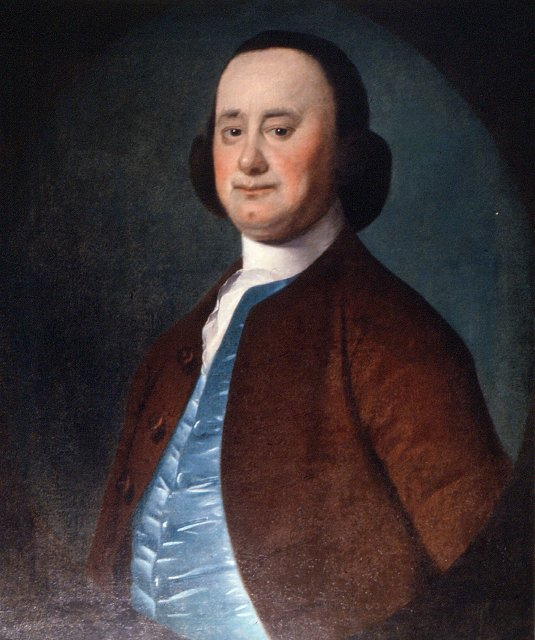
William Elliott, 1757, Gibbes Museum of Art.

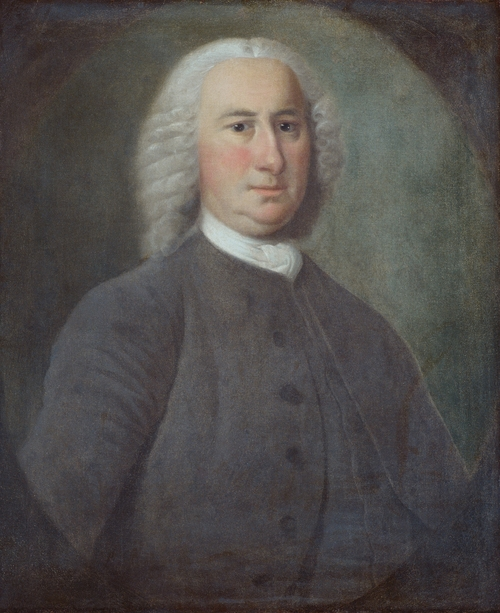
Gabriel Manigault, 1757, Metropolitan Museum of Art.

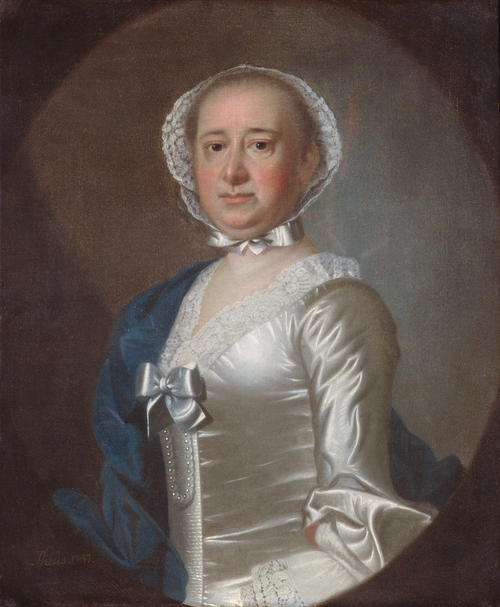
Mrs. Gabriel Manigault (Ann Ashby), 1757, Metropolitan Museum of Art.

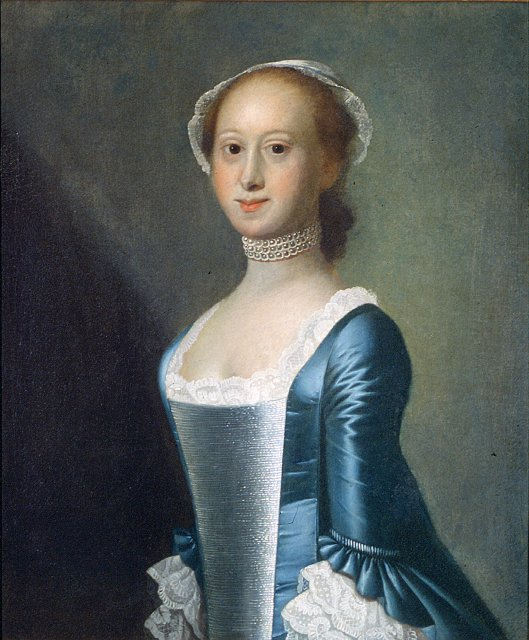
Mrs. Isaac Motte (Mary Broughton), 1758, Gibbes Museum of Art.

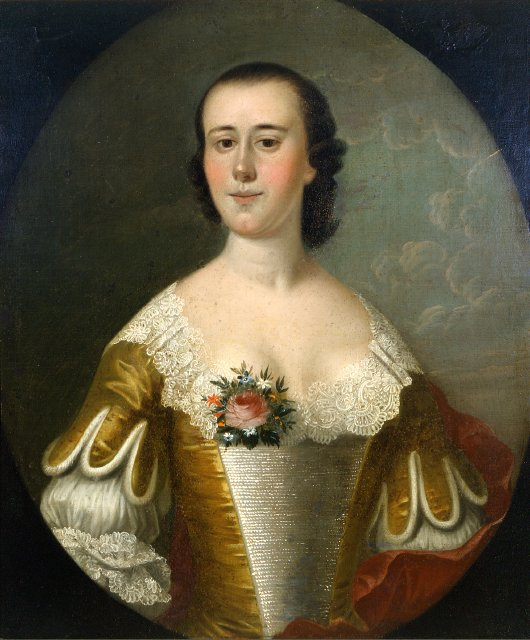
Mrs. Charles Lowndes (Sarah Parker), 1758, Gibbes Museum of Art.

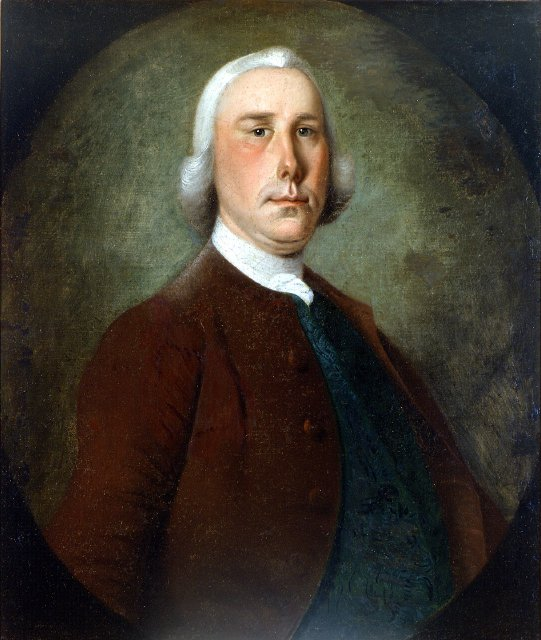
Charles Lowndes, 1758, Gibbes Museum of Art.

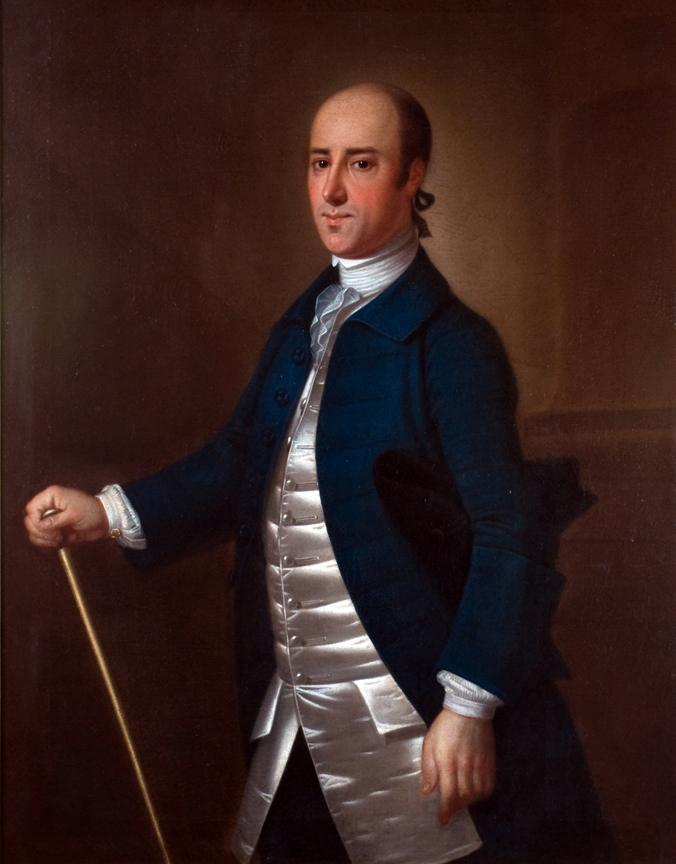
Christopher Gadsden, c. 1760-70

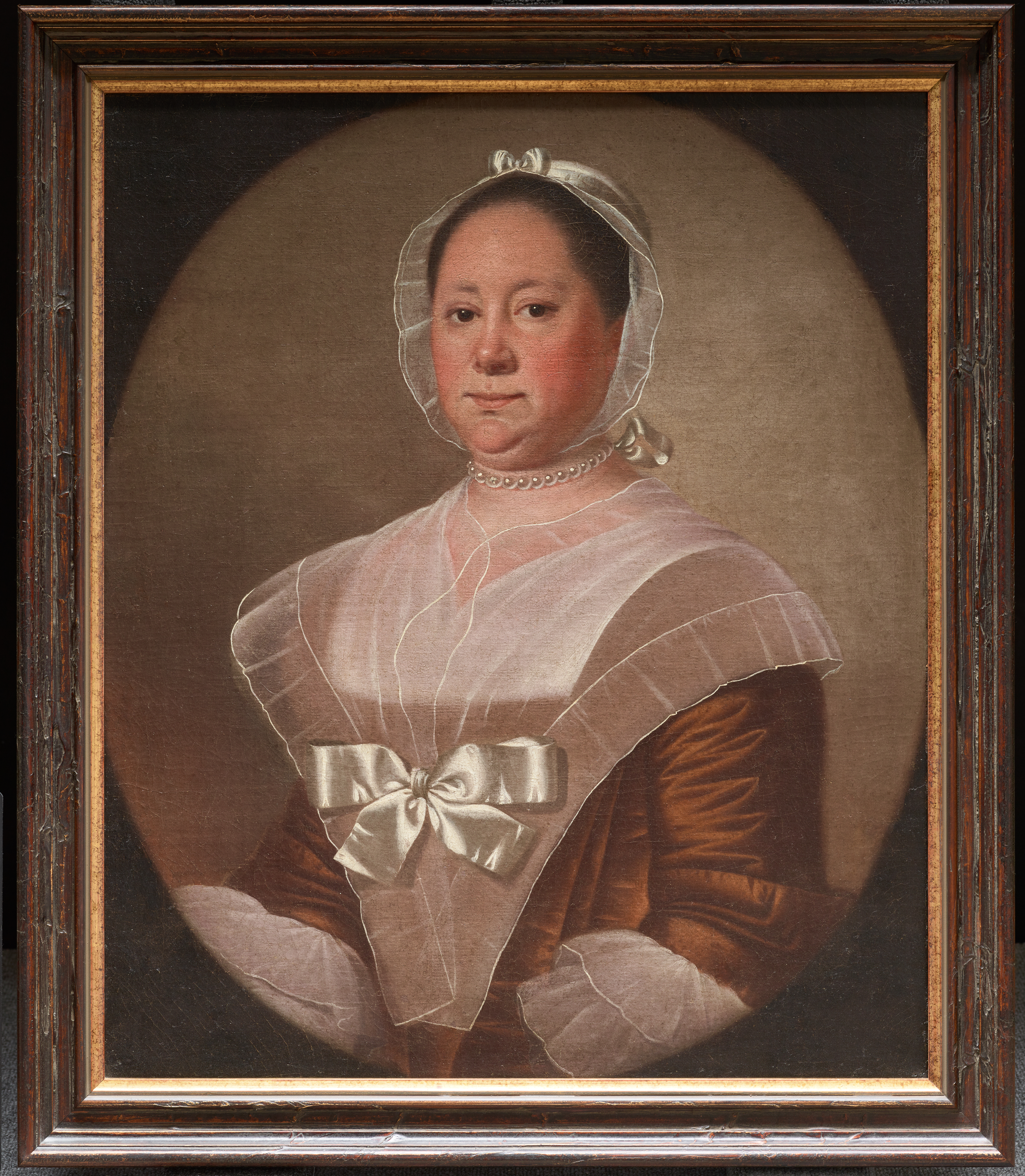
Mary Trusler, c. 1760, Dallas Museum of Art.

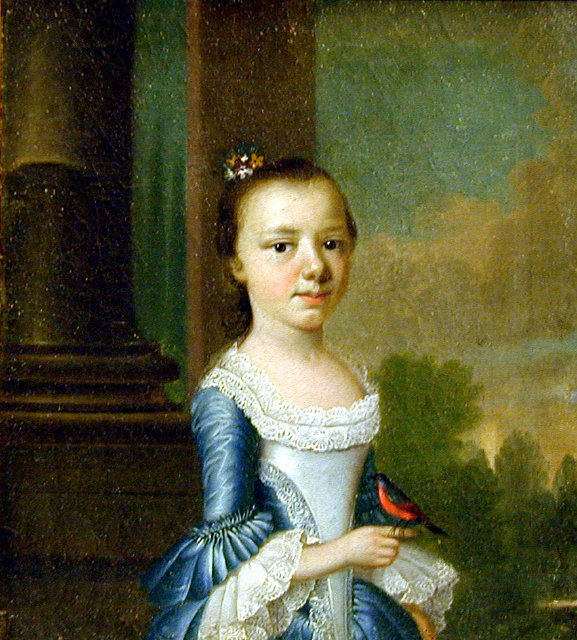
Catherine Elliott (Mrs. William Percy), 1760, Gibbes Museum of Art.

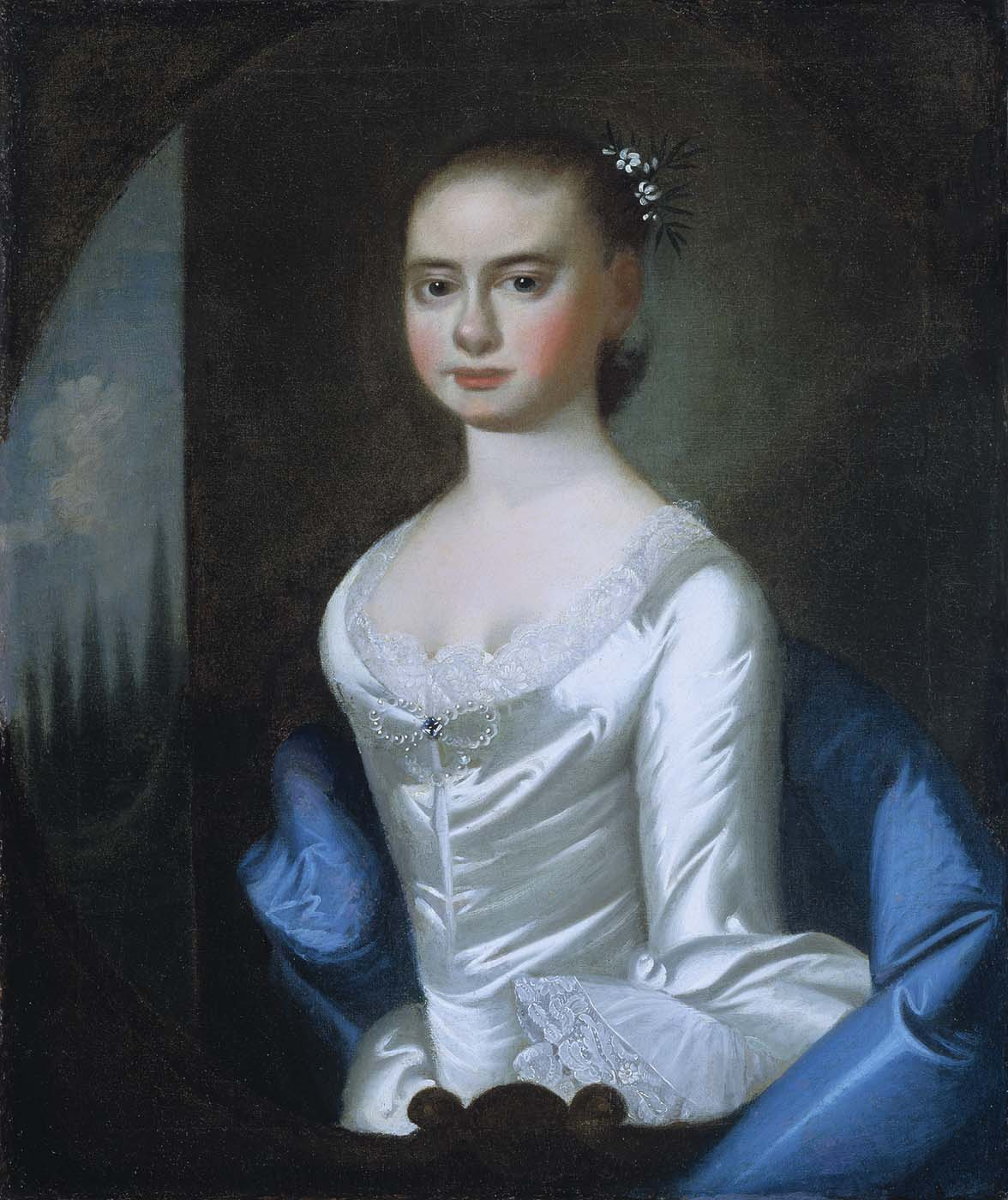
Polly Ouldfield of Winyah, c. 1761, Smithsonian American Art Museum

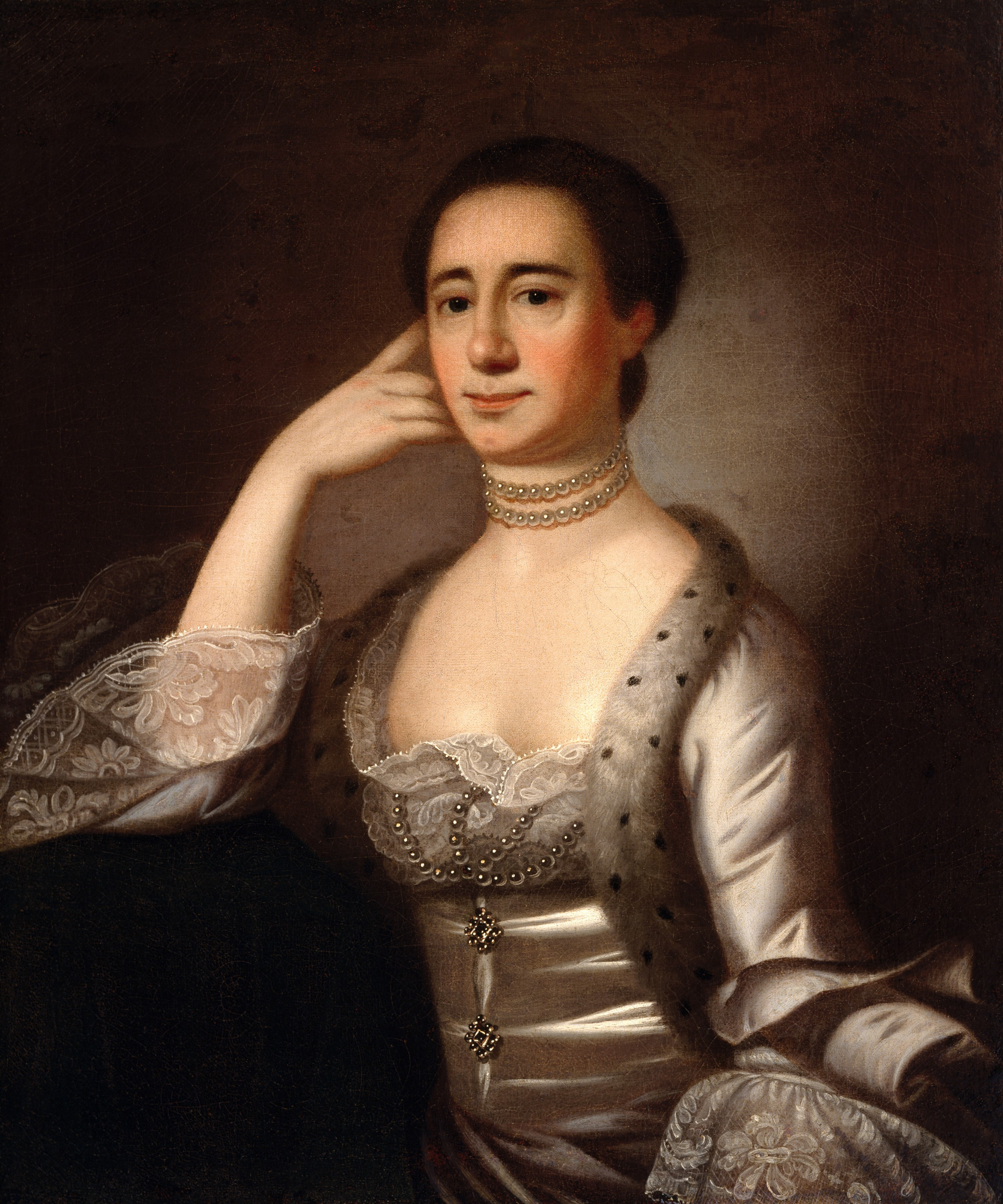
Mrs. John Champneys (Anne Livingston), c. 1763, Museum of Fine Arts, Houston.

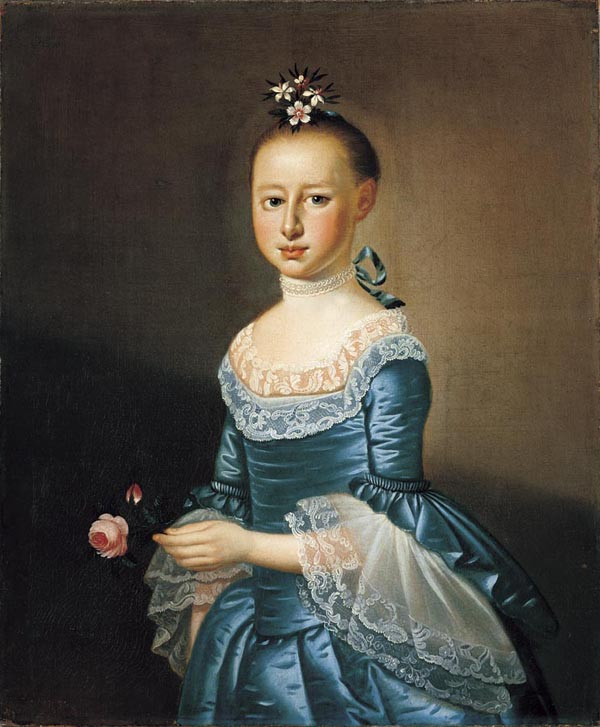
Hannah Dart, c.1765, Museum of Early Southern Decorative Arts.

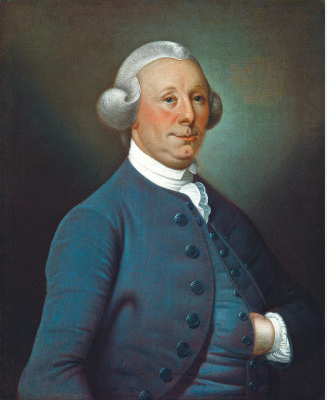
James Cuthbert, c. 1765, National Gallery of Art.

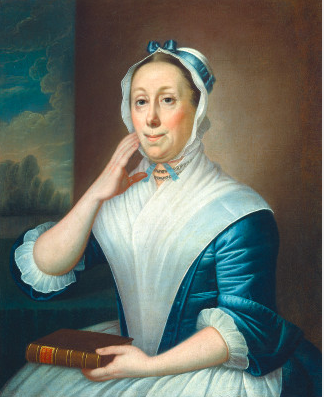
Mrs. James Cuthbert (Mary), c. 1765, National Gallery of Art.

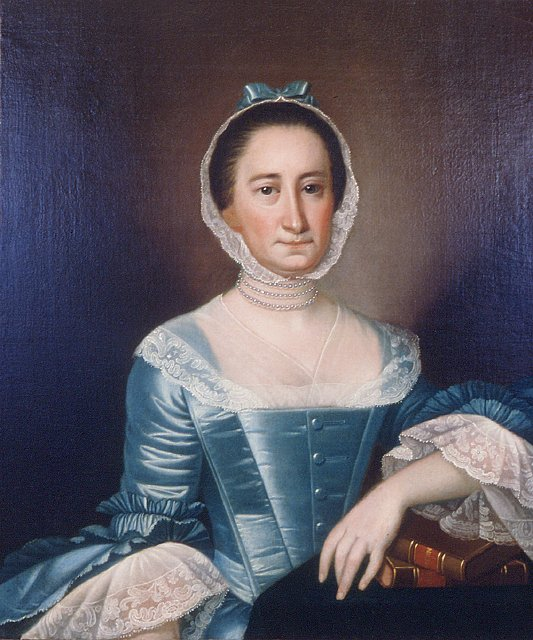
Mrs. Martha Vinson, 1766, Gibbes Museum of Art.

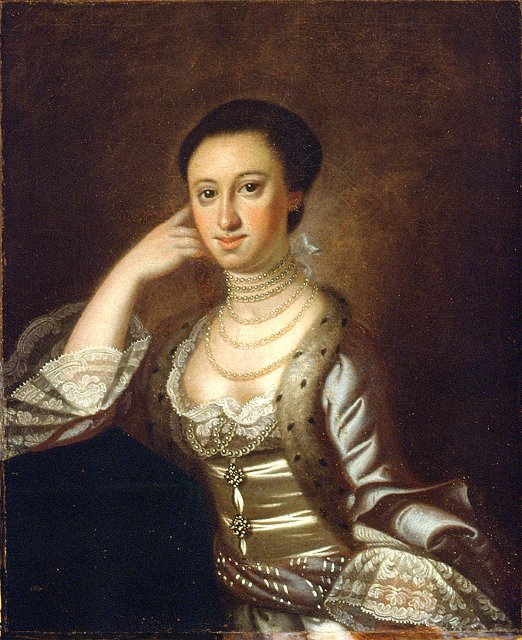
Mrs. James Skirving (Sarah Vinson), 1766, Gibbes Museum of Art.

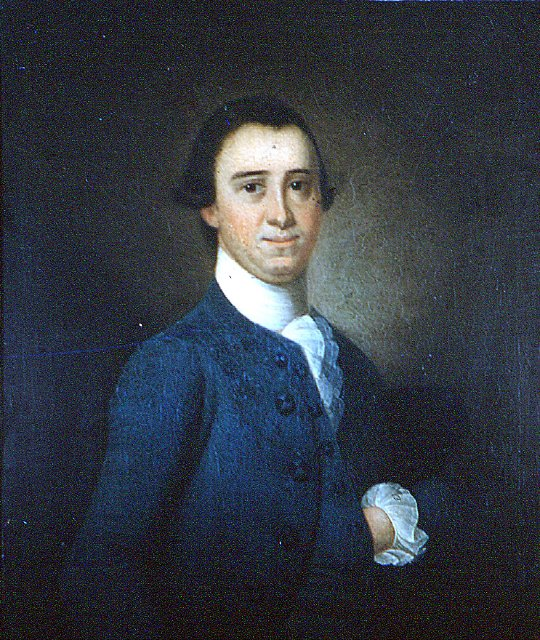
Captain James Skirving Jr., 1766, Gibbes Museum of Art.

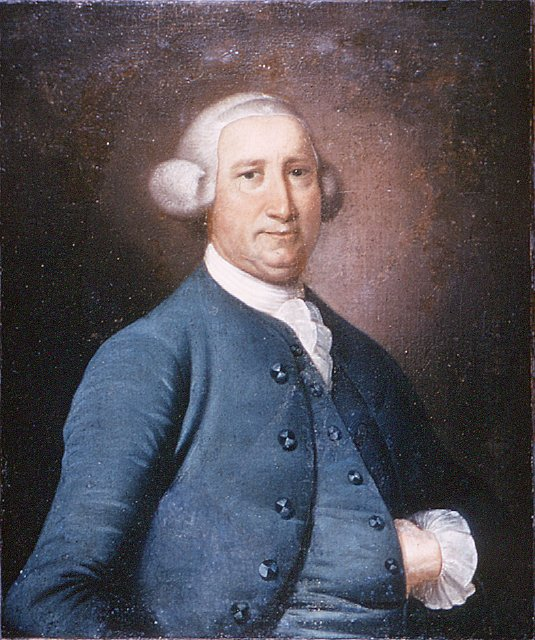
Dr. James Skirving, 1766, Gibbes Museum of Art.

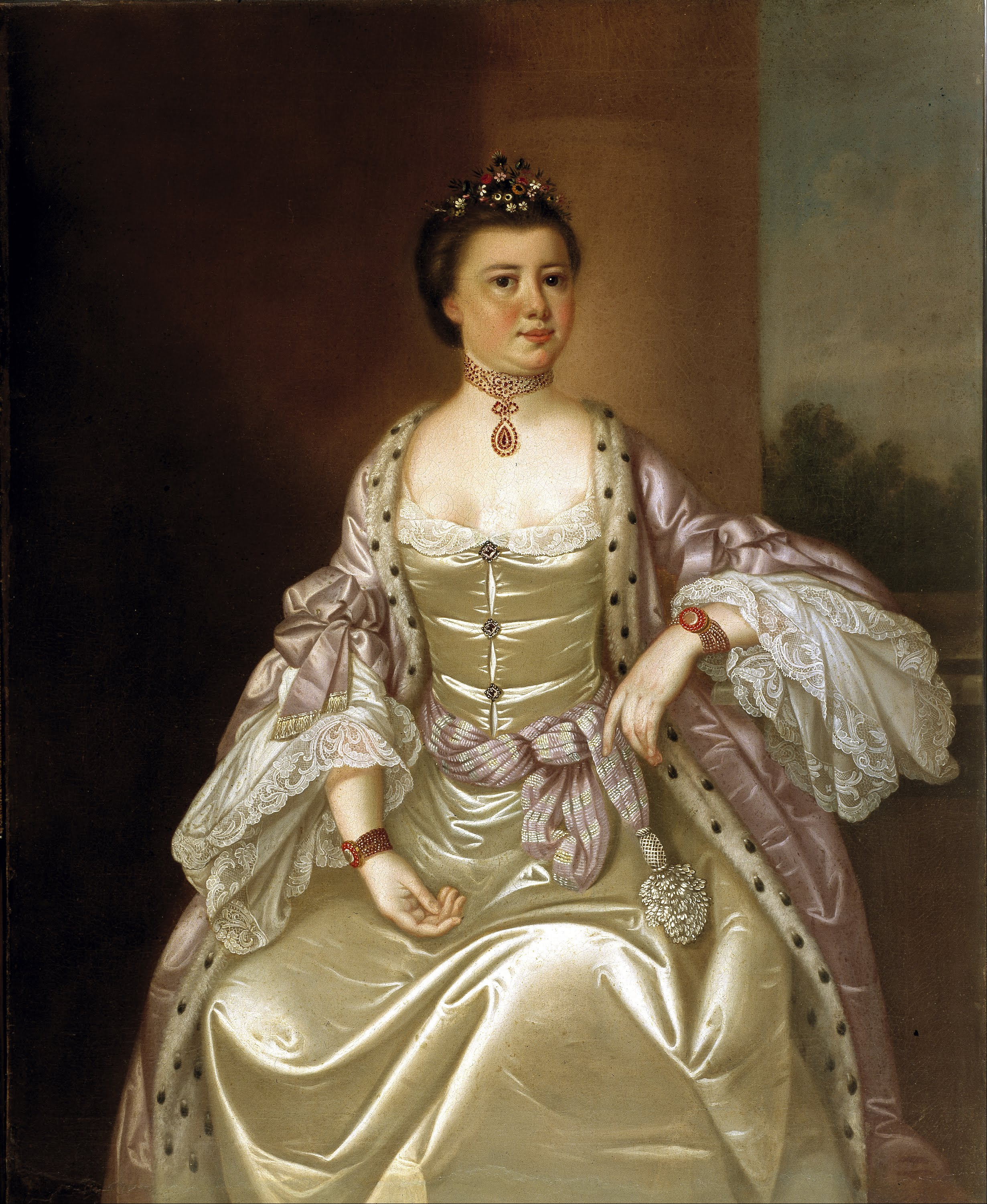
Mrs. Barnard Elliot, Jr. (Mary Elizabeth Bellinger Elliott), 1766, Gibbes Museum of Art.

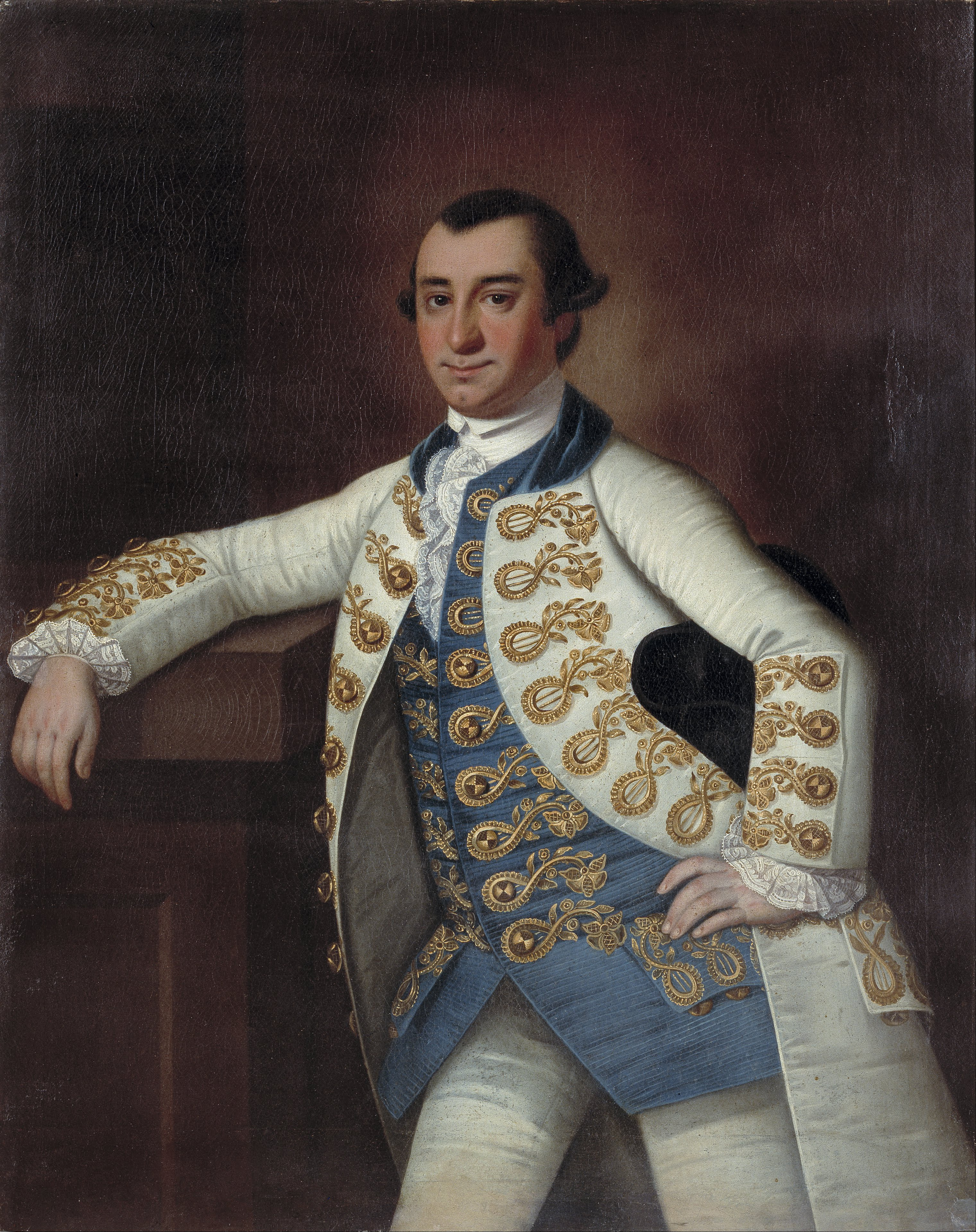
Lt. Col. Barnard Elliott Jr., 1766, Gibbes Museum of Art.

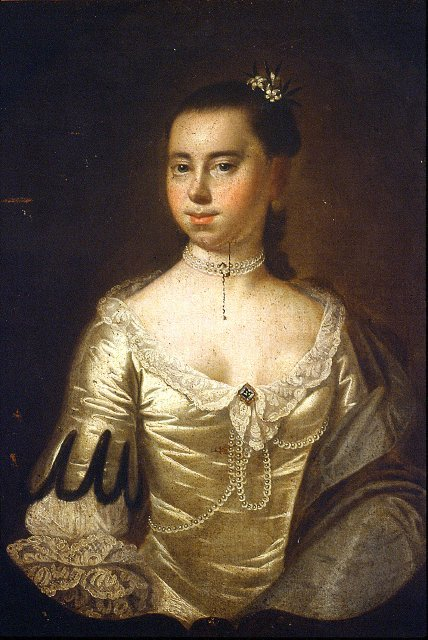
Mary Mazyck, 1770, Gibbes Museum of Art.

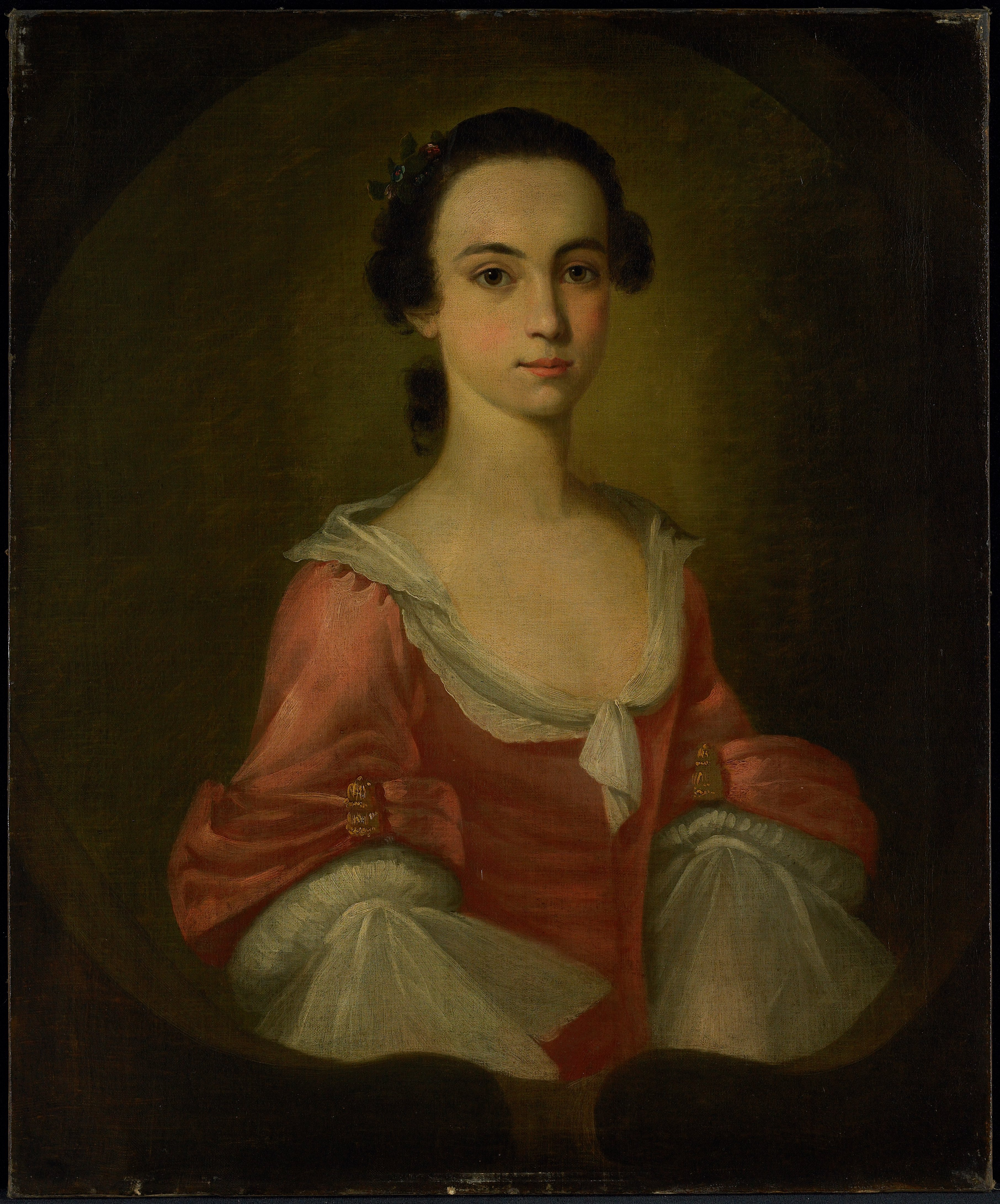
Mrs. Gardner Greene, 1770, Minneapolis Institute of Art.

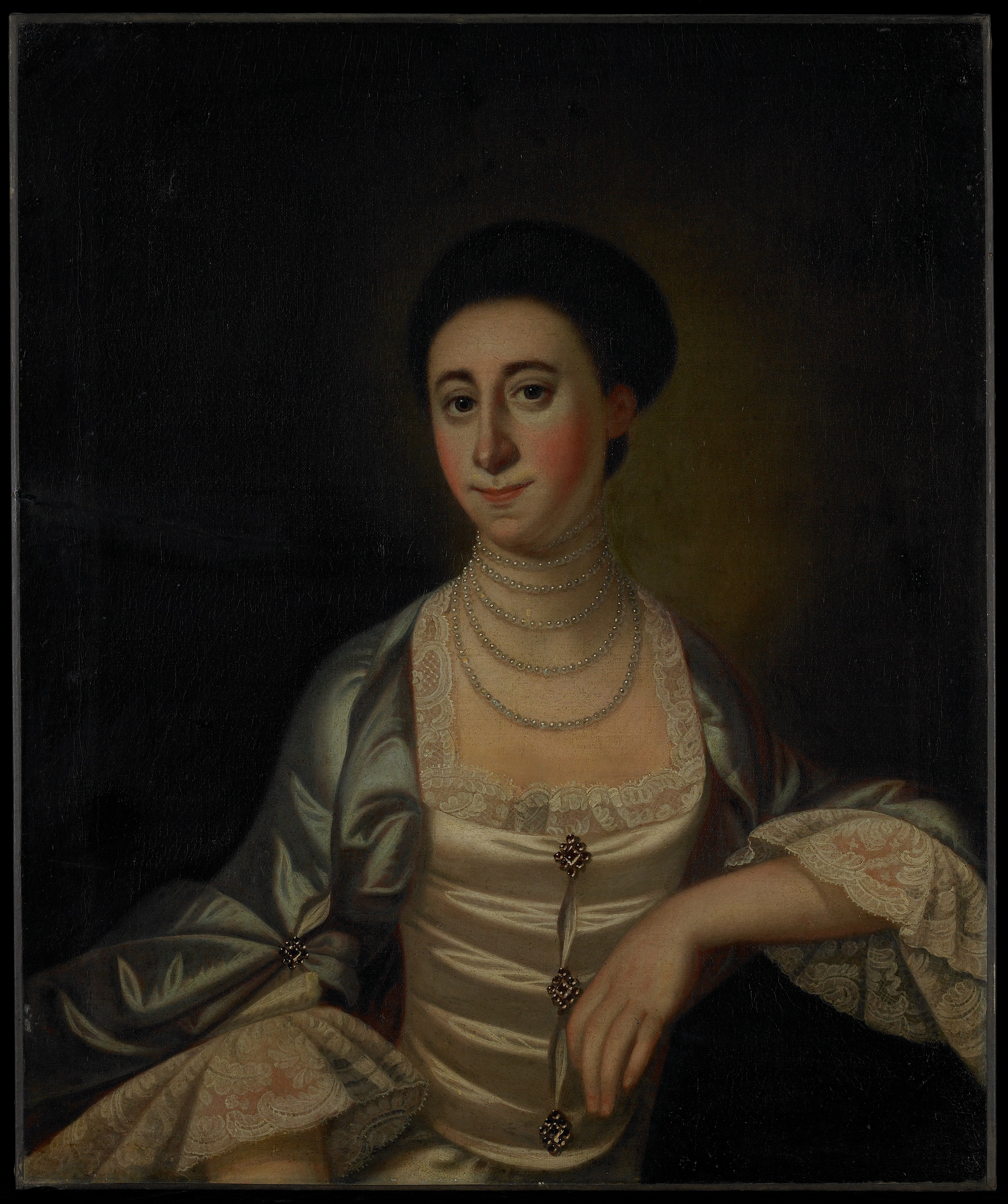
Marcy Olney, 1771, Minneapolis Institute of Art.

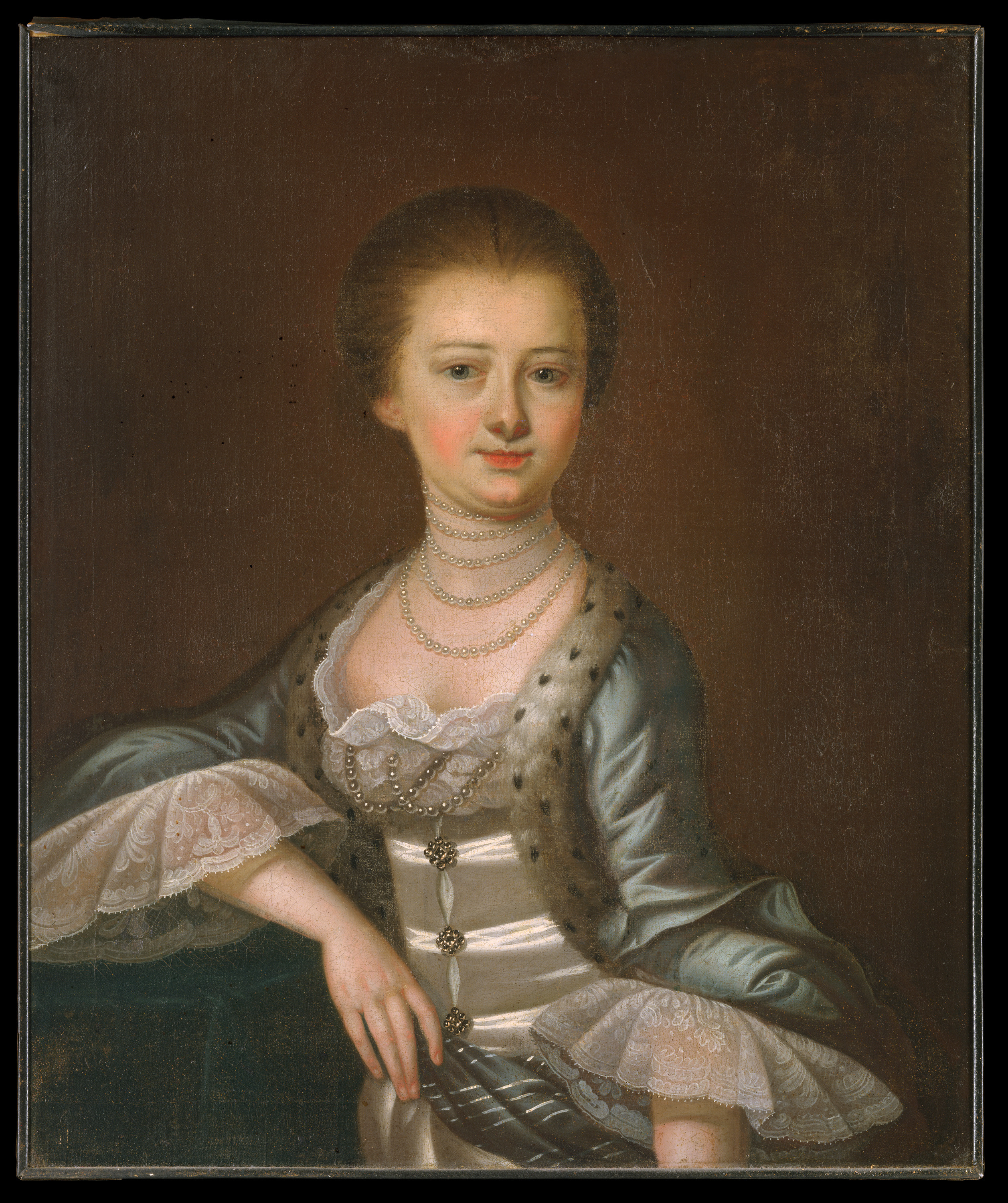
Mrs. John Dart (Henrietta Sommers), ca. 1772-74, Metropolitan Museum of Art.

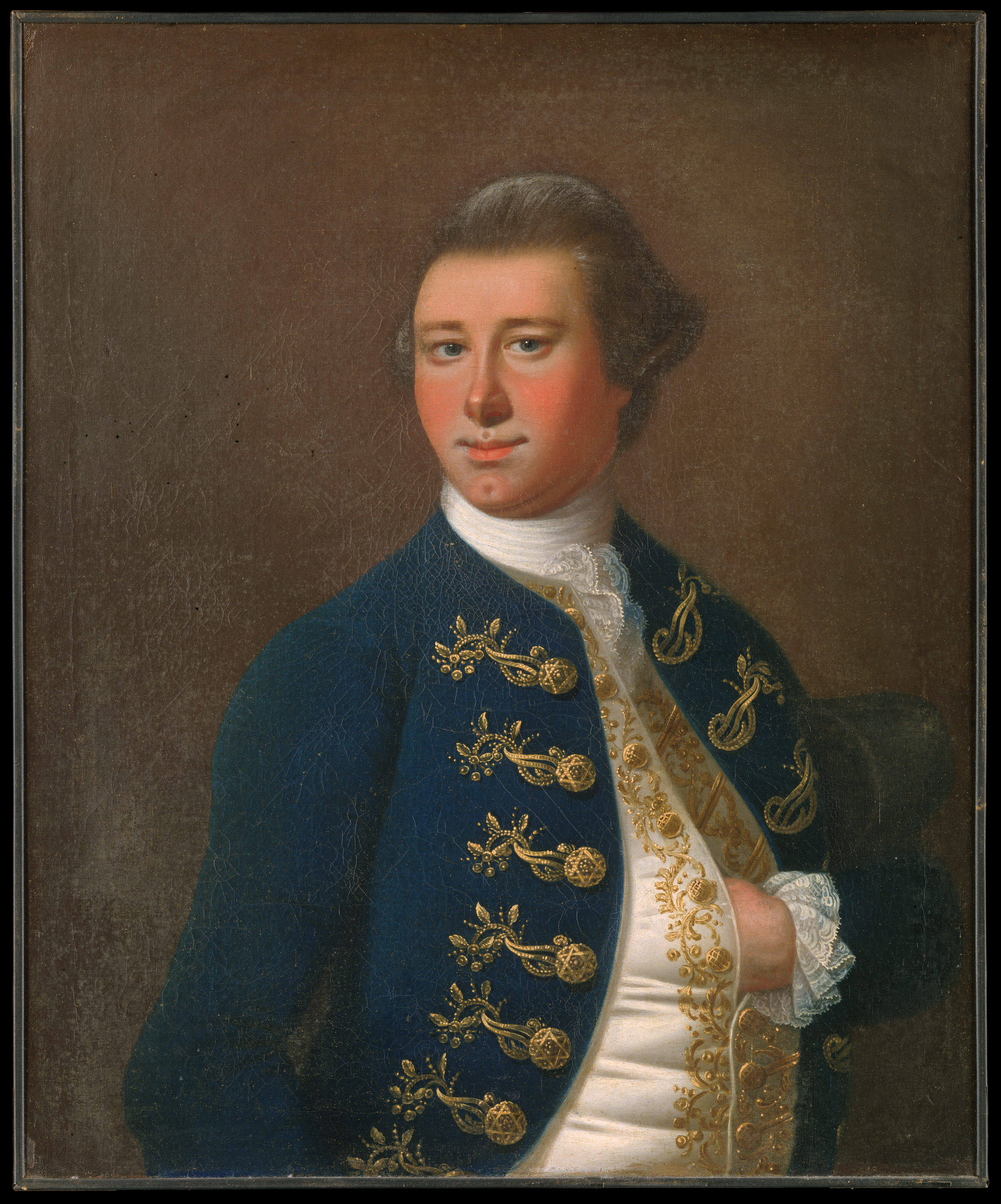
John Dart, ca. 1772-74, Metropolitan Museum of Art.

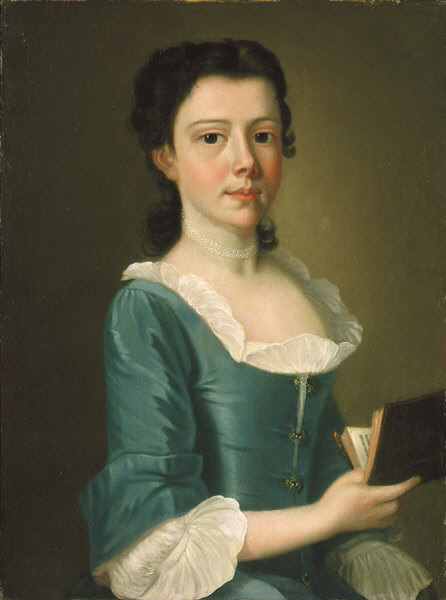
Mrs. Rawlins Lowndes (Sarah Jones), c. 1773, North Carolina Museum of Art.
