= Joseph Wragg =

American politician and slave trader (1698–1751)

- Born: 1698; Chesterfield, England
- Died: 1751 (aged 52–53); Charles Town, Province of South Carolina, British America
- Occupations: Politician, slave trader
- Spouse: Judith DuBose
- Children: Elizabeth Wragg Manigault

Joseph Wragg (1698 – 1751) was a politician and slave trader in the Province of South Carolina. Born in Chesterfield, Derbyshire, Wragg immigrated to the American colonies where he became a pioneer in the slave trade. During the 1730s, Wragg was the predominant slave trader in South Carolina. The neighborhood of Wraggborough in Charleston, South Carolina is named for him; and two city parks and seven streets in Charleston are named for him and his descendants.

== Life ==
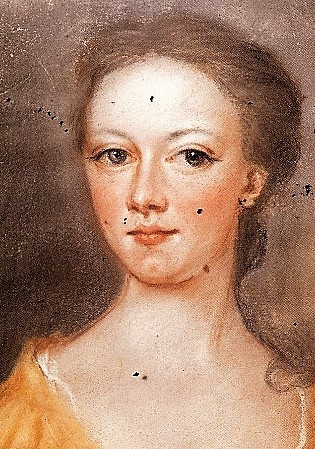
His wife Judith DuBose

Born in Chesterfield, Derbyshire to a family of Welsh descent, he and his brother Samuel Wragg were merchants in London before they moved to Charles Town, South Carolina, where both became high-volume slave traders. Initially Joseph Wragg sailed himself as a captain of slave ships.

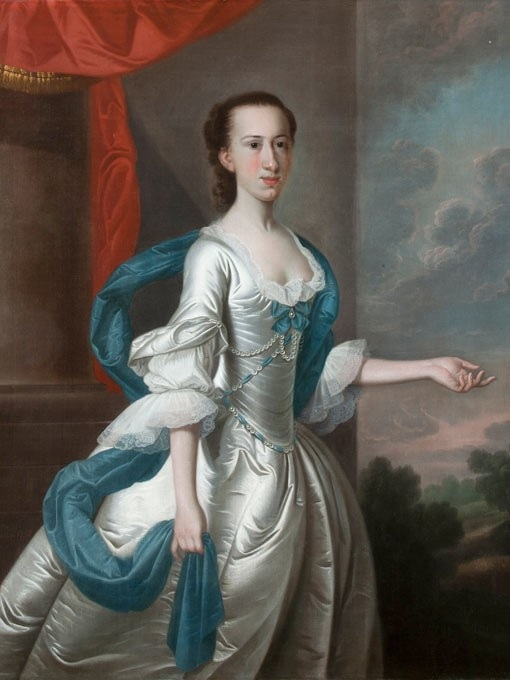
His daughter Elizabeth Wragg Manigault, wife of Peter Manigault, the wealthiest man in the British North American colonies

From the 1720s, Wragg and Benjamin Savage were the predominant slave transporters and traders in the Thirteen Colonies, and they were among the first colonial merchants and ship owners to specialize in slave trading. Between 1717 and 1744, Wragg and Savage accounted for 36 slave ships and the importation of around 10,000 African slaves. Wragg's name appears 25 times in minutes of the Royal African Company concerning shipments of slaves from the Gambia between 1722 and 1727. Historian Kay Wright Lewis describes him as "a Londoner and leading slave dealer." By the 1730s Joseph and Samuel Wragg were the first independent slave traders to break through the monopoly of the Royal African Company and were responsible for the first large influx of slaves to Charles Town. Henry Lieferman notes that "during the 1730s, for example, nearly 20,000 slaves, most of them from Angola, were imported through the city, almost a third of them by Joseph Wragg & Co., the biggest slave trader in town." For example, on 15 March 1738, Joseph Wragg & Co. sold 179 adults and 175 children taken from Angola aboard the slave ship "Shepherd."

During the year 1735/1736 alone, Joseph Wragg imported 341 slaves from Africa, 6,230 gallons of rum from Antigua and Barbados, paid duties of 296 pounds on sundries imported from Philadelphia and Barbados, exported 6,095 deerskins to London and Bristol, exported rice and imported various European goods. Between 1735 and 1739 Joseph Wragg & Co. received 20 cargoes of African slaves and paid 39,995 pounds in duties for them.

His brother Samuel Wragg served in the Executive Council after the Crown purchased Carolina from the Lords Proprietors, and his brother's influence also secured Joseph a place on the council. Joseph Wragg was also President of the council.

== Family ==
Joseph Wragg was married to Judith DuBose, the daughter of French Huguenot immigrants; her father Jacques (James) DuBose owned a large plantation near Charles Town. His brother Samuel Wragg was married to Judith's sister Marie DuBose. Samuel and his son were taken hostage by the pirate Blackbeard in 1718, and Samuel Wragg then negotiated on behalf of the government of Charles Town and agreed to provide the pirates with a chest of medicines.

Joseph Wragg's daughter Elizabeth was married to Peter Manigault, the wealthiest man in the British North American colonies by the 1770s. Another daughter, Mary, was married to the slave trader Benjamin Smith.

Joseph Wragg has numerous descendants who were prominent in American society as businesspeople, lawyers, and politicians. Among his descendants is Ursula von der Leyen.

Wraggborough, a borough in downtown Charleston, was named for him by his son John; a number of parks and streets in Wraggborough are also named for him and his children. Ann Street, Charlotte Street, Elizabeth Street, Henrietta Street, John Street, Judith Street and Mary Street, all located in Wraggborough, are named for his children. The parks Wragg Square and Wragg Mall, located on opposite sides of Charleston Museum in Wraggborough, were given to the city by his heirs. Wraggborough is today part of the larger borough of Mazyck-Wraggborough, referred to as Wraggborough for short. Wraggborough is known for historical buildings and several museums, including Charleston Museum and Gov. William Aiken House.
