= Judith DuBose =

American colonist

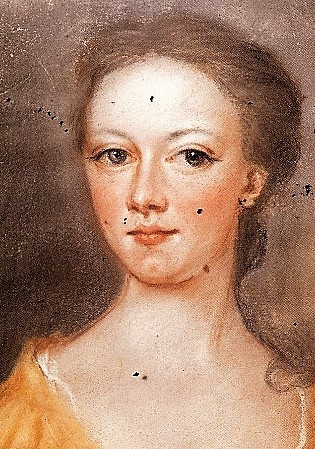
- 1719 Portrait of DuBose by Henrietta Johnston
- Born: 1698; Dockon Plantation; Province of South Carolina; British Empire
- Died: 16 December 1769 (aged 70–71); Charles Town, Province of South Carolina
- Resting place: St. Philip's Episcopal Church Cemetery
- Spouse: Joseph Wragg
- Children: Elizabeth Wragg Manigault
- Parent(s): Jacques DuBose; Marie DeGuè

Judith DuBose (1698 – 16 December 1769) was an American Colonial heiress. Born into a prominent French Huguenot family of planters, DuBose married Joseph Wragg, a prominent slave trader in British North America.

== Biography ==
DuBose was born at Dockon, her family's plantation near Charles Town. She was the daughter of Marie DeGuè and Jacques DuBose, a French Huguenot immigrant and wealthy planter. After her father died, her mother remarried John Thomas. She was named as one of her stepfather's heirs, along with her sisters, at the time of his death.

She married Joseph Wragg, a British slave trader. One of their daughters, Elizabeth, married Peter Manigault, who was the wealthiest man in British North America. Another daughter, Mary, married the slave trader and merchant Benjamin Smith. A third daughter, Henrietta, married her first cousin, William Wragg.

She was painted by the portraitist Henrietta Johnston in 1719. The painting is on display at the Gibbes Museum of Art.

DuBose died in 1769 and is buried in the cemetery at St. Philip's Episcopal Church.
