= Peter Manigault =

Attorney and legislator in colonial America

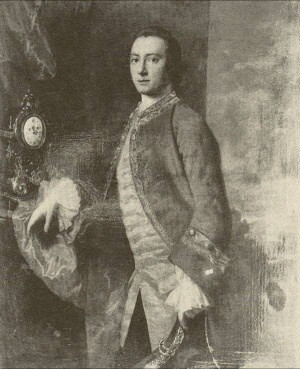

Speaker of the South Carolina House of Commons
- In office 1765–1772

Personal details
- Born: October 10, 1731 Charleston, Province of South Carolina, British America
- Died: November 12, 1773 (aged 42) London, England
- Spouse: Elizabeth Wragg (m. 1755; died 1773)
- Parent(s): Gabriel Manigault; Ann Ashby Manigault

Peter Manigault (October 10, 1731 – November 12, 1773) was an attorney, plantation owner, and colonial legislator native to Charleston, South Carolina. He was the wealthiest man in the British North American colonies at the time of his death and owned hundreds of enslaved persons. He was the son-in-law of Joseph Wragg, the largest slave trader of North America in the 1730s.

== Early life ==
Coat of Arms of Peter Manigault

Manigault (pronounced MAN-eh-go) was born in Charleston on October 10, 1731, and was part of a wealthy French Huguenot immigrant family. Manigault was the son of Gabriel Manigault (1704–1781) and Ann (née Ashby) Manigault (1705–1782).

His paternal grandparents were Judith (née Jetton-Gitton) Manigault and Pierre Manigault, a French Huguenot who settled in the Santee area and became a successful rice planter. His maternal grandparents were John Ashby and Constantia (née Broughton) Ashby (whose brother Thomas Broughton was Governor of South Carolina).

He was privately educated in the Province of South Carolina and in England, traveled extensively in Europe, studied law at London's Inner Temple, and was called to the English bar in 1752.

== Career ==
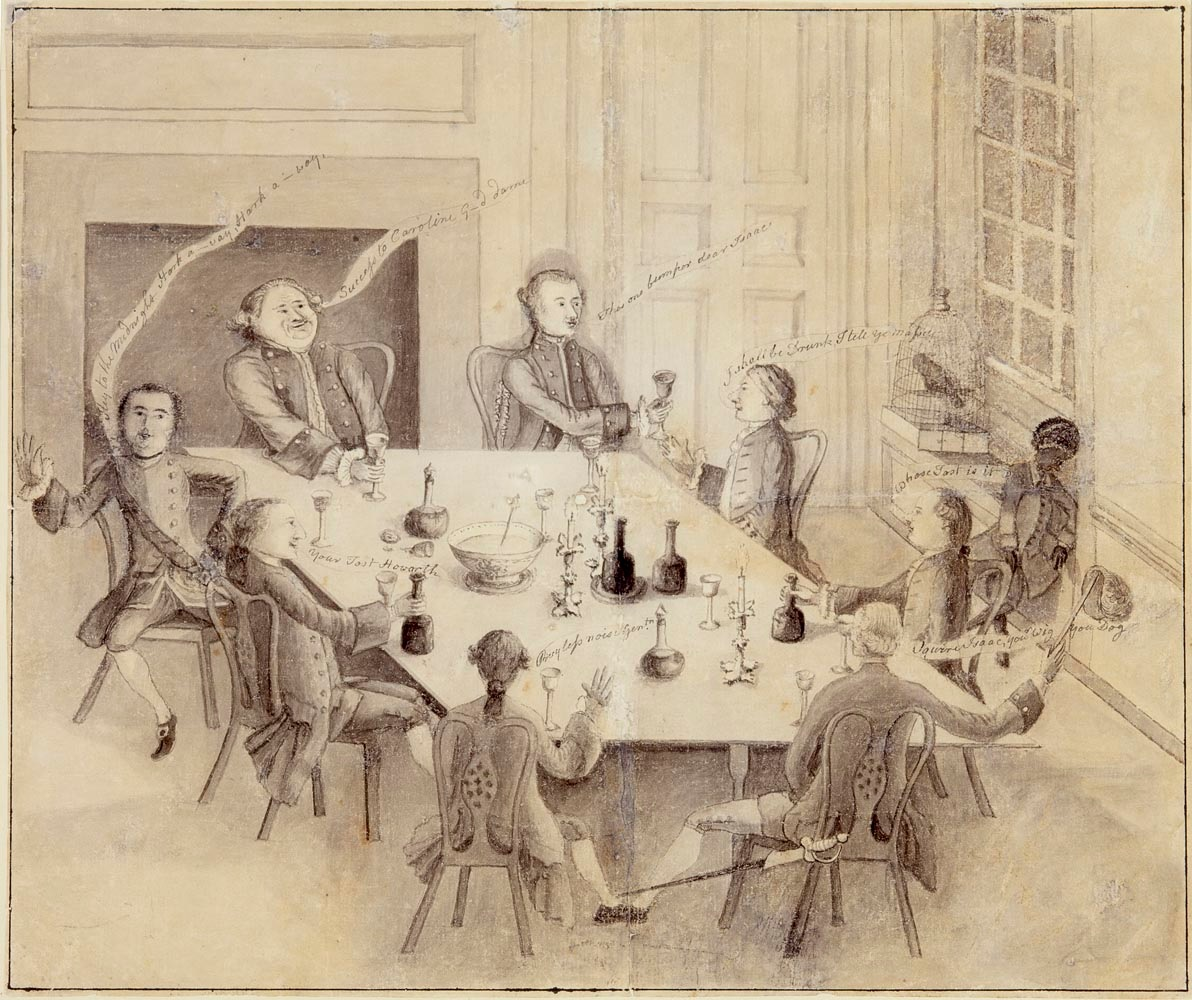
Mr. Peter Manigault and Friends. Folk art depicting Manigault and his friends drinking around his table, c. 1760.

He returned to South Carolina in 1754, where he practiced law, became a successful merchant and banker, and managed his family's extensive plantation holdings. By 1774 Manigault was the wealthiest person in the British North American colonies, with a net worth - that included hundreds of slaves - of approximately £33,000 in 1770, which was equal to approximately $4 million in 2016.

Manigault served in the South Carolina House of Commons in 1755, and again from 1765 to 1773. From 1765 to 1772 he was Speaker of the House. He actively opposed the British Stamp Act 1765, and was identified with what became known as the Patriot cause.

=== Letters ===
During Manigault's studies in London and travels in Europe, he exchanged frequent letters with his parents. This correspondence was published as part of several articles over several years in the South Carolina Historical and Genealogical Magazine.

A caricature drawn by George Roupell circa 1760 was entitled "Mr. Peter Manigault and his Friends" and depicts Manigault and several of his friends and acquaintances taking part in a drinking party. (Note: The caricature depicts several South Carolina Huguenots and British officers of the 42nd Regiment of Foot (then the South Carolina Independent Company) at Manigault's Steepbrook home. The event must have occurred in 1754, which was the only year that all were alive and physically in South Carolina. Clockwise, the subjects are identified as: Captain Raymond Demeré (1702-1766); "Success to Carolina, g-d damn!" Captain Massey; "This one bumper, dear Isaac." Isaac Godin; "I shall be drunk, I tell ye Massey." Captain Richard Coytmore (d. 1760); "Squire Isaac, your wig you Dog." Lieutenant Colonel Probert Howarth; "Hey to the midnight, Hark a way, hark a way." George Roupell; "Pray less noise, gentlemen." Peter Manigault; "Your tost [sic] Howarth." Lieutenant Charles Taylor; "Whose tost [sic] is it?")

== Personal life ==
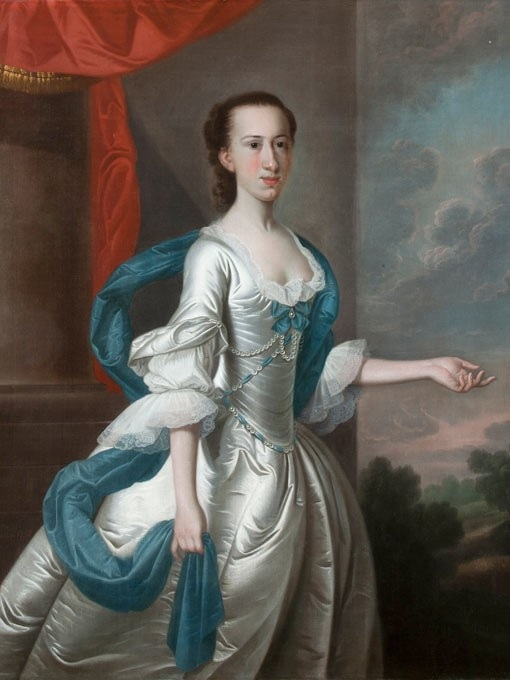
Portrait of his wife, Elizabeth, c. 1757, by Jeremiah Theus.

In 1755, Manigault was married to Elizabeth Wragg (1736–1773). She was the daughter of Judith (née Dubose) and Joseph Wragg, an English-born American who was one of the largest slave traders in British North America. Their children included:

- Gabriel Manigault (1758–1809), who married Margaret Izard (1768–1824), a daughter of Continental Congressman and U.S. Senator Ralph Izard.
- Anne Manigault Middleton (1762–1811), who married Thomas Middleton (1753–1797)
- Joseph Manigault (1763–1843), who married Charlotte Drayton (1781–1855)
- Henrietta Manigault Heyward (1769–1827), who married Nathaniel Heyward (1766–1851).

In 1773, Manigault's health worsened, and he left South Carolina for England in an effort to find a cure. His wife died on February 19, 1773. Manigault's health did not improve, and he died in London on November 12, 1773. He was buried at French Protestant Huguenot Church Cemetery in Charleston.

=== Descendants ===
Through his son, he was the grandfather of Elizabeth Manigault Morris (1785–1822), who married Col. Lewis Morris (a grandson of Lewis Morris, a signer of the Declaration of Independence), and were the parents of Capt. Charles Manigault Morris of the Confederate States Navy; Gabriel Henry Manigault (1788–1834); and Charles Izard Manigault (1795–1874).

The Manigault family has remained prominent in Charleston, including as owners of the city's daily newspaper, The Post and Courier, which was purchased by Peter Manigault's great-grandson Arthur in 1896.

== See also ==
- List of richest Americans in history
