= Wraggborough =

Neighbourhood in Charleston, South Carolina, United States

Coordinates: 32.790°N 79.934°W

Wraggborough is a neighborhood in downtown Charleston, South Carolina, named after slave trader Joseph Wragg, and noted for its association with the slave trade. Wraggborough is part of Mazyck-Wraggborough, also referred to as Wraggborough for short. The neighborhood is located between Ansonborough to the south and Hampstead Village to the north.

In the 18th century it was a property owned by Joseph Wragg, the largest slave trader in North America for several years in the first half of the 18th century. After his death it was named in his honor by his son John Wragg. Wraggborough was the centre of his slave trading operations. The parks Wragg Square and Wragg Mall are part of the borough. Seven streets in the borough are named for Joseph Wragg's children: Ann Street, Charlotte Street, Elizabeth Street, Henrietta Street, John Street, Judith Street and Mary Street.

Wraggborough includes several museums, including Charleston Museum and Gov. William Aiken House.
