= Gabriel Manigault =

American architect

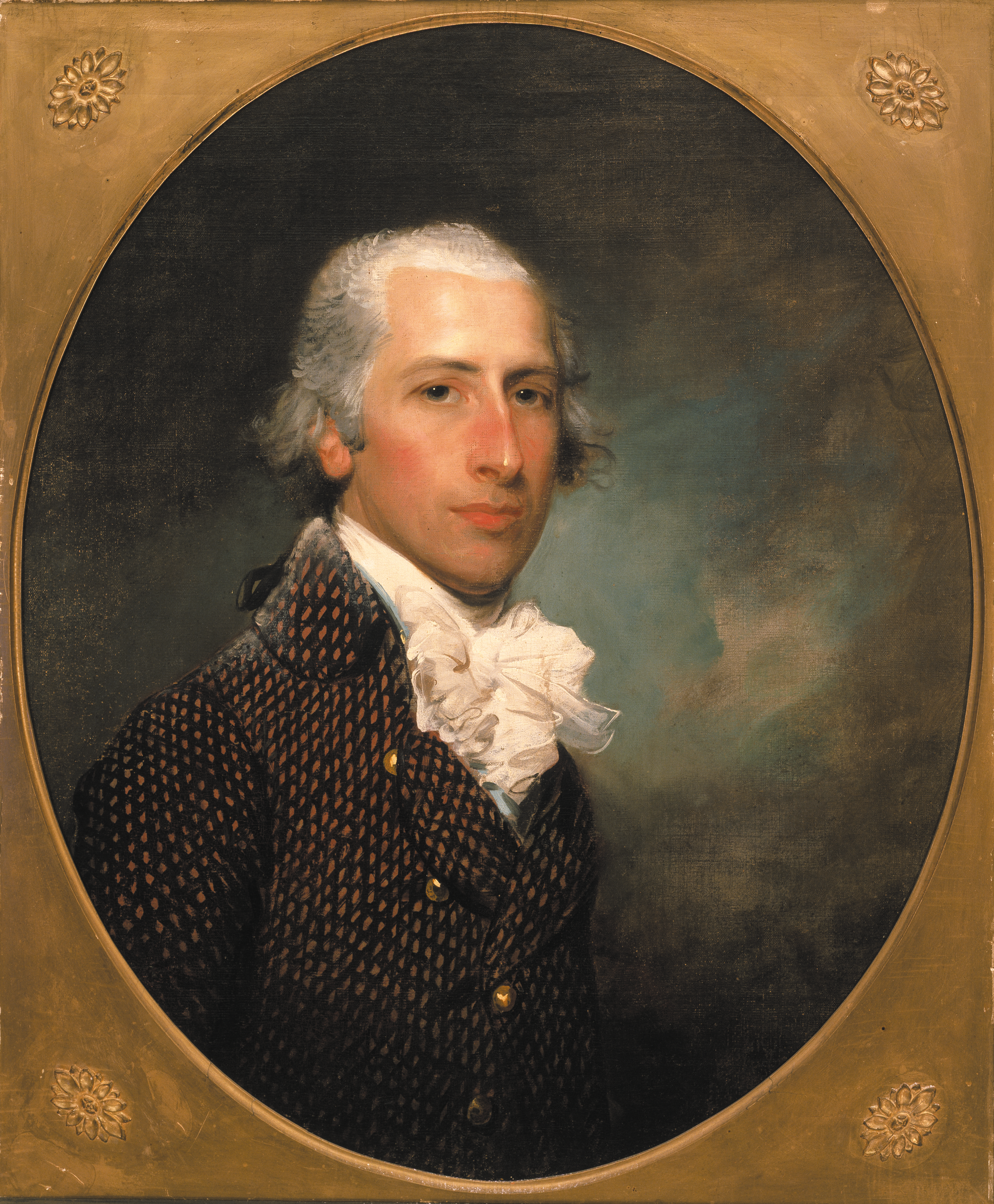
- Manigault by Gilbert Stuart, 1794
- Born: 17 March 1758; Charles Town, South Carolina, Great Britain
- Died: 4 November 1809 (aged 51); Philadelphia, Pennsylvania, United States
- Spouse: Margaret Izard (m. 1785)
- Children: 7 daughters and 4 sons
- Parent(s): Peter Manigault; Elizabeth Manigault
- Relatives: Charles Morris (grandson)

Gabriel Manigault (March 17, 1758 – November 4, 1809) was an American architect.

== Early life ==
Manigault was born in Charles Town on March 17, 1758. He was the son of Elizabeth Wragg Manigault and Peter Manigault, the wealthiest person in British North America in 1770. His sister, Henrietta Manigault, was the wife of Nathaniel Heyward, a wealthy rice planter who accumulated at least twenty-two plantations and assorted lands throughout the low country.

His great-grandfather was Pierre Manigault (1664–1729), a French Huguenot who was born in La Rochelle, France and settled in Charleston.

== Career ==
He studied law in Geneva and London in the 1770s; it was in England that he was exposed to the emerging Adamesque style. Manigault returned to Charleston in 1780 during the American Revolutionary War. He participated in the defense of the city during the Siege of Charleston that year. Following the city's fall, Manigault was forced to take an oath of allegiance in order to maintain his family's numerous assets. Following the war, he turned his attention to rice planting on the nearly 25,000 acres he had inherited from his father, Peter. The wealth obtained from this endeavor allowed him to practice as an amateur or "gentleman" architect.

In Charleston, he designed the First Bank of the United States building (now Charleston City Hall), completed between 1800 and 1804, and South Carolina Society Hall, constructed in 1804. Manigault's architectural talents also extended to the domestic realm. In 1803, a fine "urban villa" in the Adamesque style was completed for his brother Joseph Manigault on Meeting Street in Charleston. He may have designed Presqui'ile and William Blacklock House. It is not known if he designed his own home, completed at 290 Meeting Street, ca. 1802. The house was demolished in 1929.

== Personal life ==
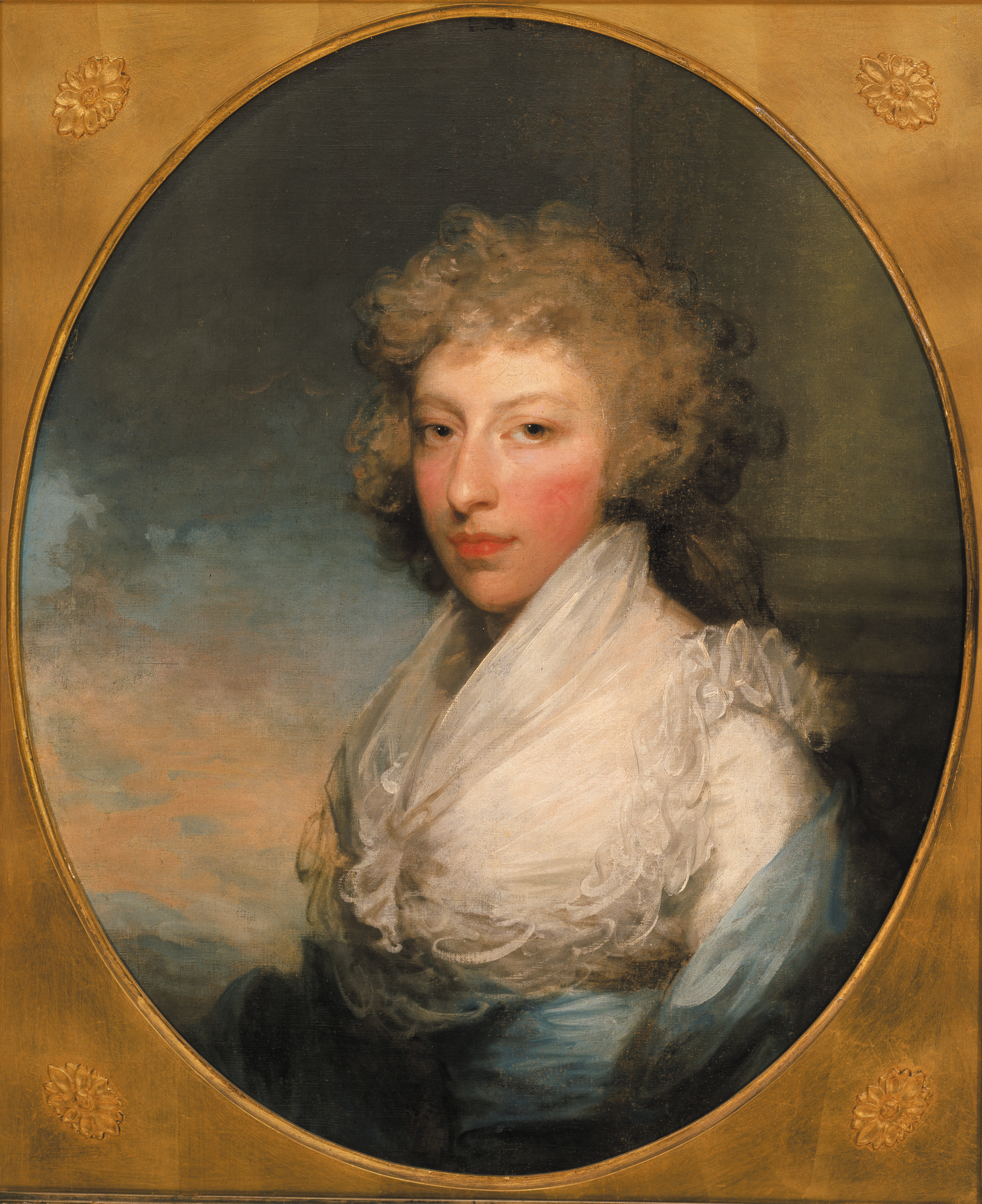
1794 Portrait of Manigault's wife, Margaret Izard, by Gilbert Stuart

In 1785, Manigault was married to Margaret Izard (1768–1824), the daughter of Alice (née DeLancey) Izard and Ralph Izard, a member of the Continental Congress and a United States senator from South Carolina from 1789 to 1805. After her father's death in 1804, her mother lived in Philadelphia. Together, Gabriel and Margaret were the parents of:

- Harriet Manigault, who married Samuel Wilcocks.
- Elizabeth Manigault Morris (1785–1822), who married Lewis Morris (1785–1863), a grandson of Lewis Morris, 3rd and last Lord of Morrisania Manor who was a Continental Congressman and signer of the Declaration of Independence.
- Peter Manigault (1788–1788), who died young.
- Gabriel Henry Manigault (1788–1834), who married his first cousin, Anne Manigault Heyward (1800–1855).
- Ann Manigault (d. 1792)
- Charlotte Manigault
- Charles Izard Manigault (1795–1874), who married his first cousin, Elizabeth Heyward (1808–1877).
- Emma Manigault
- Ann Manigault (d. 1800)
- Edward Manigault
- Caroline Manigault.

Between the late 1780s and 1790s, the family traveled north frequently, visiting the Izard family who lived in New York. In 1805, Manigault sold part of his South Carolina land, and moved permanently to Clifton, an estate near Philadelphia, Pennsylvania. He died in Philadelphia, Pennsylvania, on November 4, 1809, aged 52.

=== Descendants ===
Through his daughter Elizabeth, he was the grandfather of Margaret Ann "Meta" Morris (1810–1881), who married John Berkley Grimball; and Capt. Charles Manigault Morris of the Confederate Navy.

Through his son, Charles Izard Manigault, he was the grandfather of Professor Gabriel E. Manigault, curator of the Charleston Museum (1873 - 1899). Professor Manigault was responsible for diversifying the Museum's collections and acquiring many of the natural history specimens still on display.
