= Gabriel Manigault (merchant) =

American merchant 1704–1781

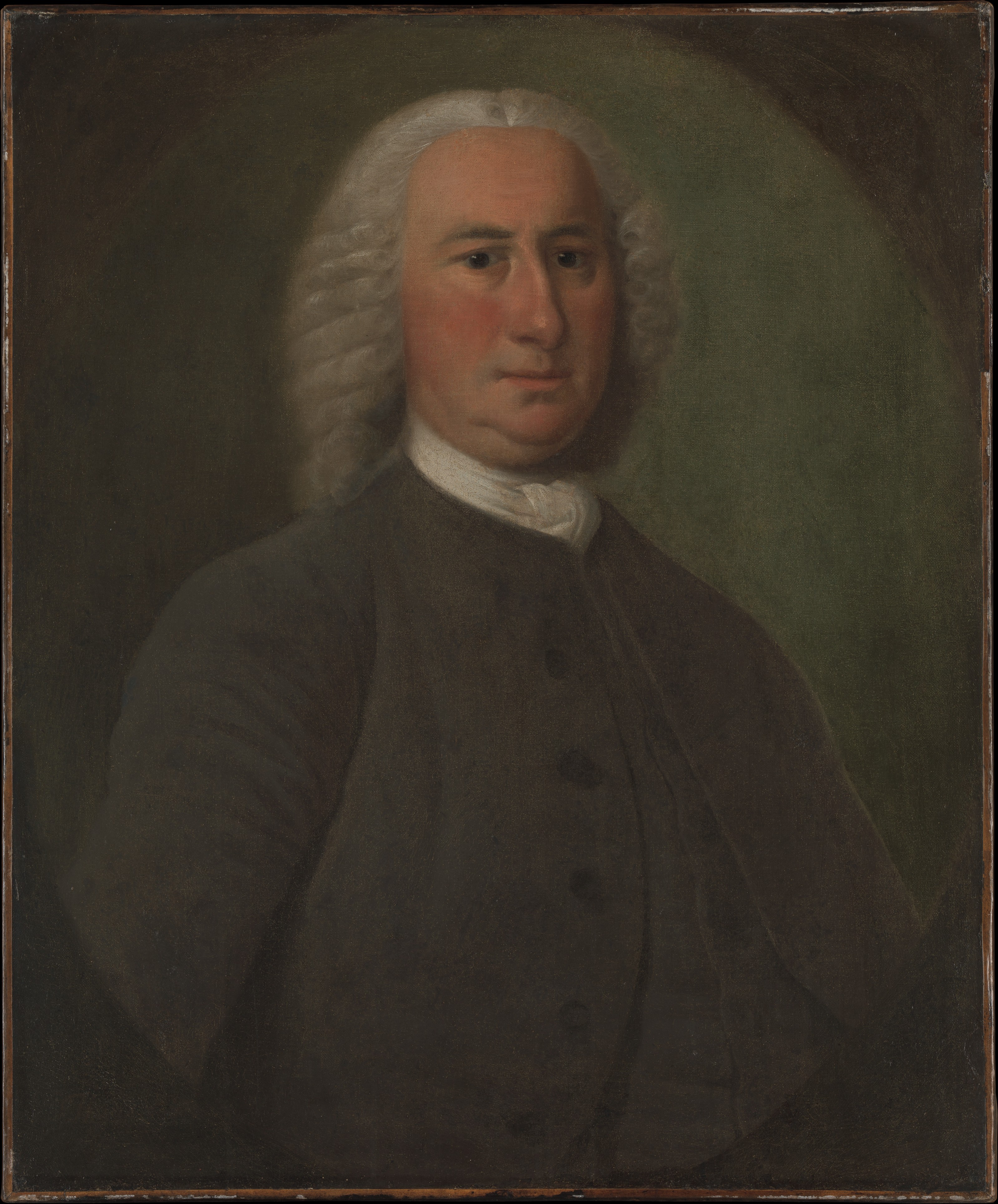
- Manigault by Jeremiah Theus, 1757
- Born: 21 April 1704; Charles Town, South Carolina, British America
- Died: 5 June 1781 (aged 77)
- Spouse: Ann Ashby

Gabriel Manigault (April 21, 1704 – June 5, 1781) was an American merchant.

Coat of Arms of Gabriel Manigault

Manigault was born in Charles Town 21 April 1704; died there, 5 June 1781. He engaged successfully in commercial pursuits in Charles Town, accumulating a fortune of about $800,000. He invested his profits in rice plantations and slaves, eventually owning 270 of the latter. He was treasurer of the province of South Carolina in 1738, when the accounts of the St. Augustine expedition were examined, and for several years represented Charleston in the provincial house of commons. Shortly after the Declaration of Independence, he advanced $220,000 from his private fortune to the state of South Carolina for purposes of defence. When General Augustine Prevost appeared before Charles Town in May 1779, he armed and equipped himself and his grandson, Joseph, a boy of fifteen, and both took their places in the lines for the defence of the city. At his death, he left £5,000 sterling to the South Carolina society, of Charles Town.
