= Charleston Museum =

Historic museum in Charleston, South Carolina, United States of America

Coordinates: 32.7898°N 79.9359°W

The Charleston Museum
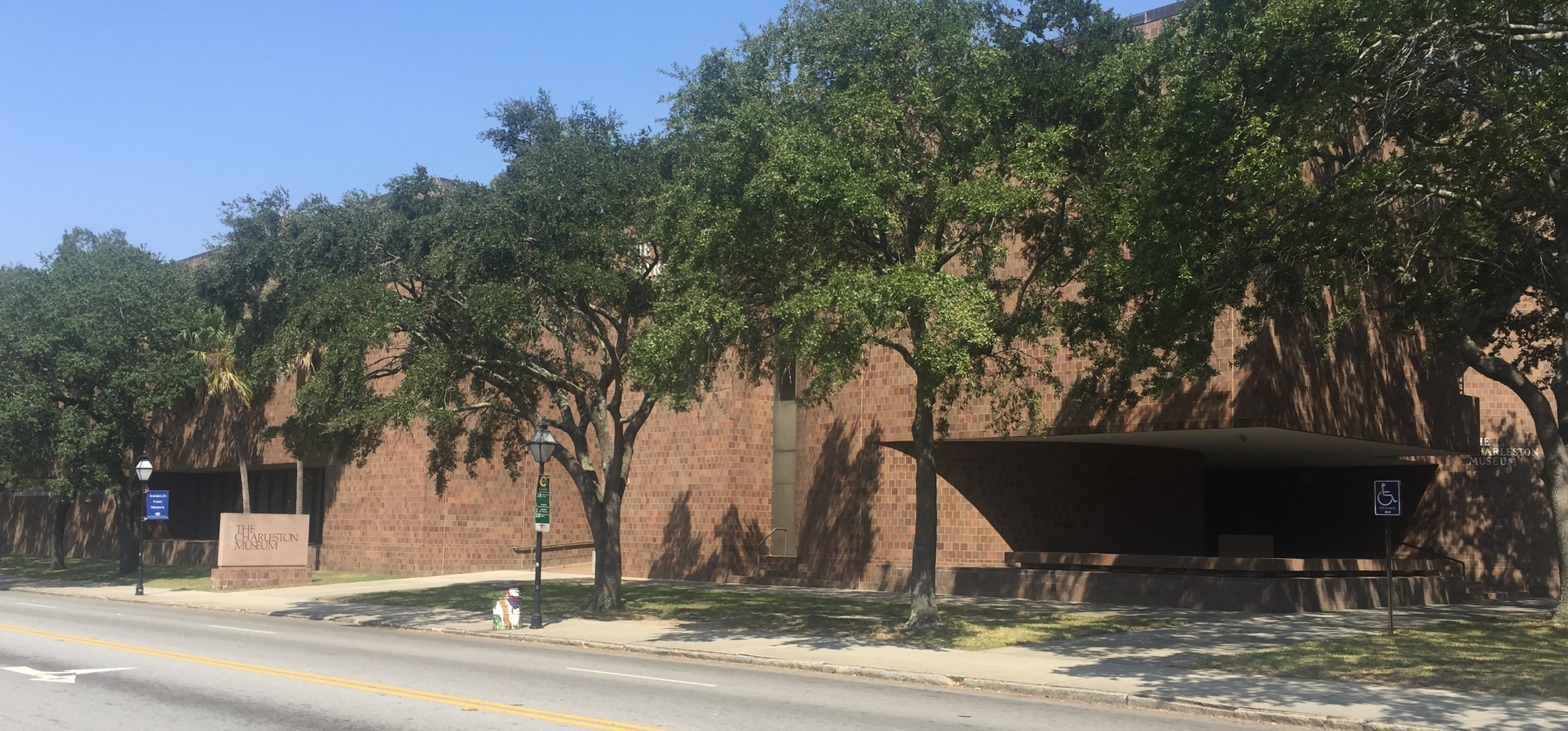
- Established: January 12, 1773; 252 years ago
- Location: 360 Meeting Street, Charleston, South Carolina, United States
- Website: Museum's Homepage

The Charleston Museum is a museum located in the Wraggborough neighborhood in Charleston, South Carolina. Established in 1773, it is the oldest museum in the United States. Its collection includes historic artifacts, natural history, decorative arts and two historic Charleston houses. It replaced the Old Charleston Museum that burned down due to unknown causes.

== History ==
The Charleston Museum was founded on January 12, 1773, and opened to the public in 1824. Other museums in the category of oldest in the United States include the Peabody Essex Museum in Salem, Massachusetts and the American Philosophical Society in Philadelphia.

In 1920, when the museum hired Laura Bragg as its director, she became the first woman to direct a publicly-funded art museum in America.

The museum's present building was completed in 1980 at 360 Meeting Street, Charleston, South Carolina.

The museum received the remains of Native Americans into their collection in the late 19th through mid-20th century that had been discovered accidentally or through archaeological expeditions. The museum began repatriation of remains before Congress passed the Native American Graves Protection and Repatriation Act in 1990. Two sets of remains have been repatriated and the museum is in consultation with tribes about the remaining 80 Native American ancestors that have been inventoried and reported.

== Description ==
The museum's exhibits include natural history and local history displays and decorative arts, including silver. The museum is also home to the only known fossil of the extinct Pelagornis sandersi, which is possibly the largest flying bird ever discovered.

The museum also owns and operates two historic house museums:

- Heyward-Washington House – late 18th-century house owned by Founding Father Thomas Heyward, Jr., Revolutionary patriot and signer of the Declaration of Independence. It is best known as the lodging of President George Washington during his 1792 visit to Charleston.
- Joseph Manigault House – Federal-style home decorated with American, English and French furnishing of the early 19th century

In addition to the two houses, the museum also maintains The Dill Sanctuary. From the site:

"... located on James Island contains assorted habitats for wildlife and numerous cultural features including three earthen Confederate batteries and prehistoric, colonial, antebellum, and postbellum archaeological sites. The Dill Sanctuary has been protected for purposes of preservation, wildlife enhancement, research and education, and is used only for Museum-sponsored programs. Habitat has been enhanced by creation of a six-acre wildlife pond (2.4 ha), with three nesting islands, which provides a reliable source of fresh water for animals and nesting sites for both migratory and resident birds. 2001 saw the construction of the Dill Education Center and bathroom facilities which hosts Museum education programs."

=== Collections ===
- Charleston furniture
- Charleston silver
- Lowcountry textiles, including costumes, quilts, and needlework
- South Carolina ceramics
- Egyptian artifacts
- Archives - documentary and photographic resources
- South Carolina ornithology
- Nineteenth-century firearms
- Invertebrate and Vertebrate Paleontology Collections
- Skeletal Reconstructions of various Vertebrate Groups
- Rocks and Minerals from around the World
- Numerous Plant and Animal species collected by local Naturalists.
