= Joseph Manigault House =

Historic house in South Carolina, United States

- U.S. National Register of Historic Places
- U.S. National Historic Landmark
- U.S. National Historic Landmark District – Contributing property
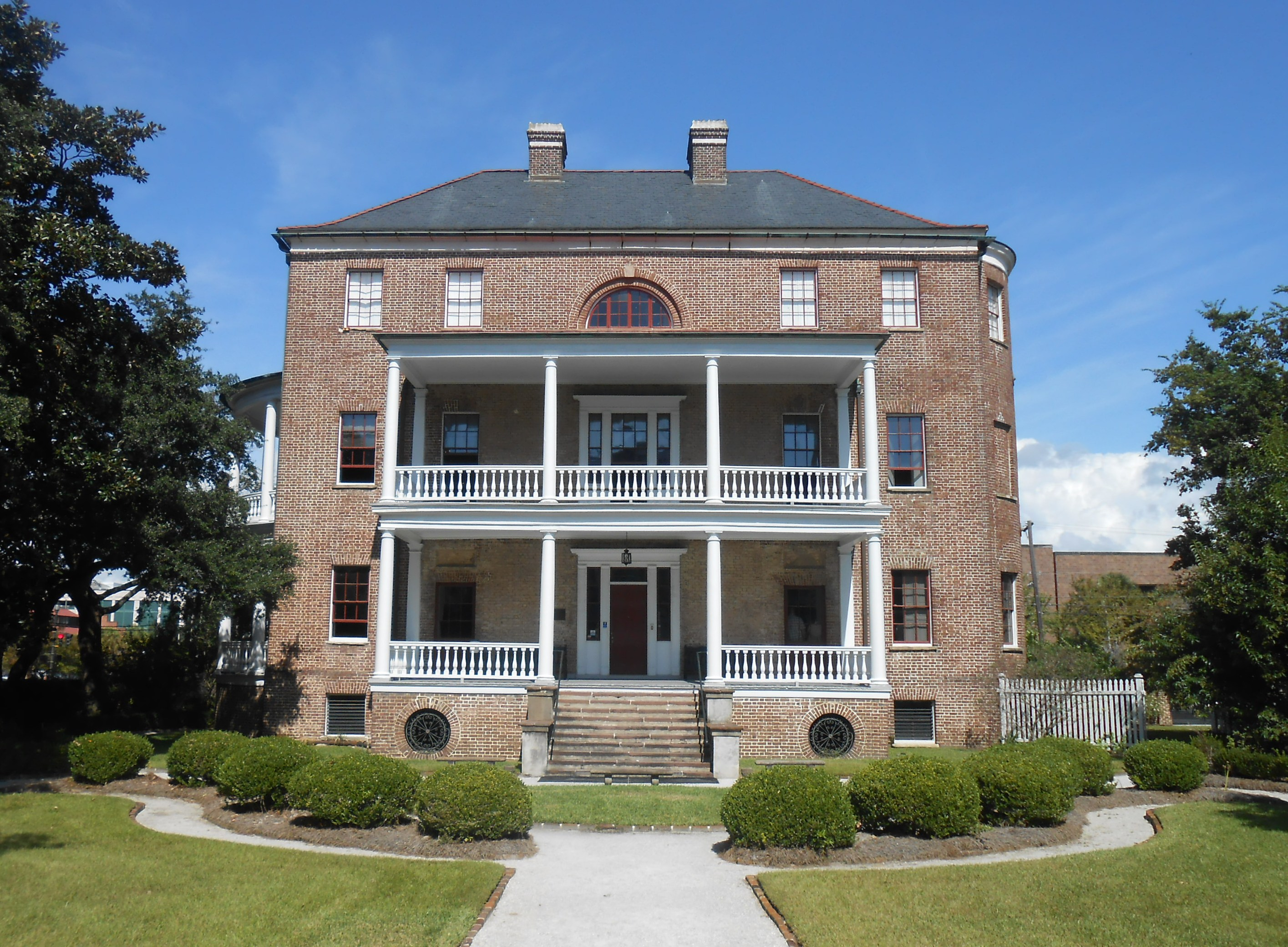
- Joseph Manigault House

- Location within South Carolina Location within the United States
- Location: 350 Meeting St., Charleston, South Carolina
- Coordinates: 32°47′19″N 79°56′7.7″W
- Built: 1803
- Architect: Gabriel Manigault
- Architectural style: Early Republic
- Part of: Charleston Historic District (ID66000964)
- NRHP reference No.: 73001688

Significant dates
- Added to NRHP: November 7, 1973
- Designated NHL: November 7, 1973
- Designated NHLDCP: October 9, 1960

The Joseph Manigault House is a historic house museum in Charleston, South Carolina that is owned and operated by the Charleston Museum. Built in 1803, it was designed by Gabriel Manigault to be the home of his brother, and is nationally significant as a well-executed and preserved example of Adam style architecture. It was declared a National Historic Landmark in 1973.

== Description and history ==
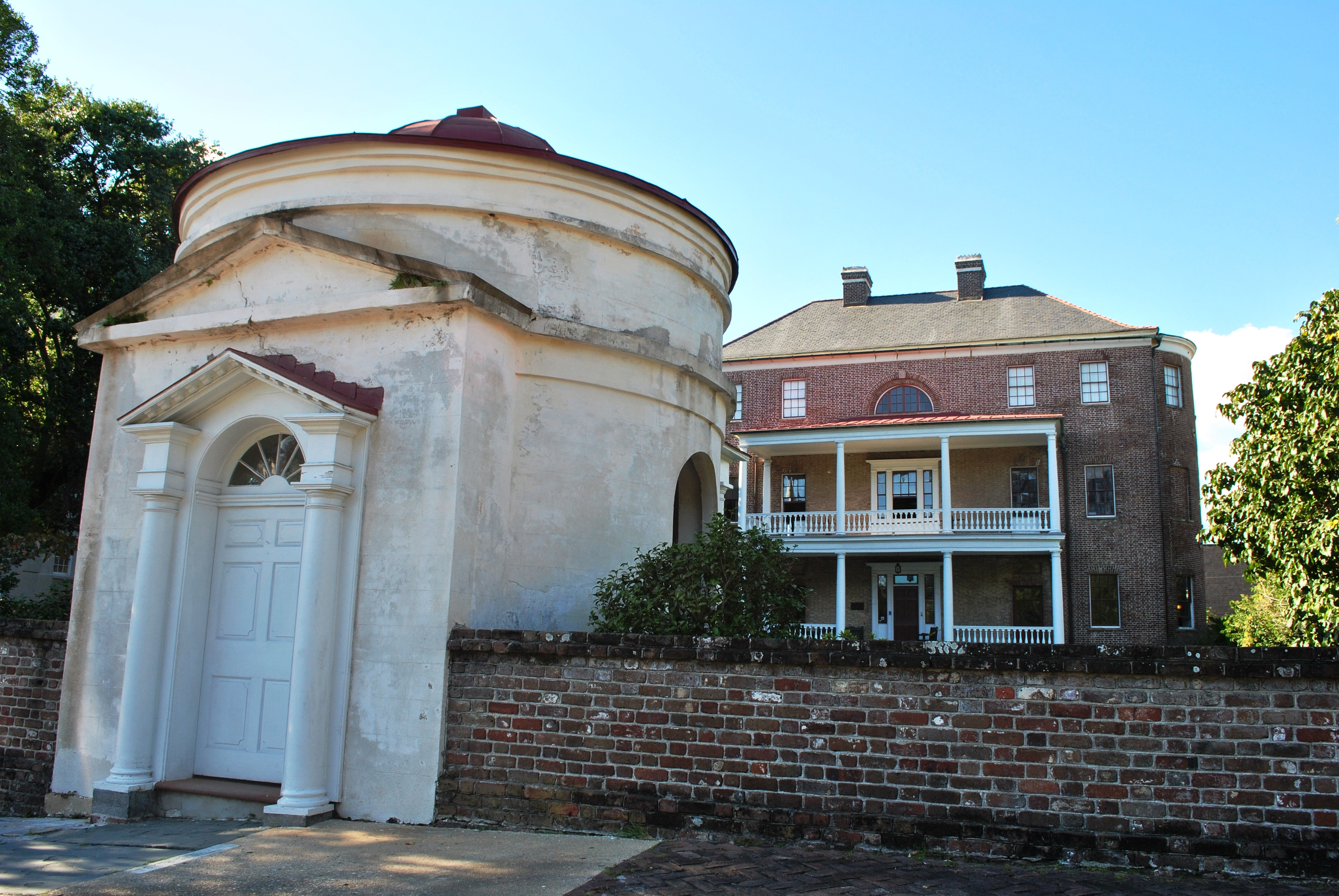
Joseph Manigault House, gatehouse

The Manigault House is located near the center of the Charleston peninsula, at the corner of Meeting and John Streets. It is a three-story brick structure, set on a raised brick foundation. The main facade has a two-story porch across the center three bays, with elaborate doorways on both floors featuring slender pilasters and sidelight windows. A semicircular stairwell projects from one sidewall, and a bowed porch from the other, giving the house the rough shape of a parallelogram. The interior features delicately refined woodwork in its fireplace mantels, door and window moulding, and cornices, reflective of the style promoted by Robert Adam, which differentiated the scale of these elements in domestic and civic architecture. The gatehouse standing near the property entrance is an architectural folly.

The house was built in 1803 for Joseph Manigault to a design by his brother Gabriel. Gabriel Manigault had studied architecture in London before the American Revolutionary War, and was familiar with Robert Adam's design principles. This was the first major work of his to exhibit these principles, and was also one of the first houses in Charleston that was not obviously based on the standard "single house" and double house" models then commonly used. The house also includes a number of construction elements designed to minimize problems with pests.

Manigault's executor sold the house in 1852 to George N. Reynolds, Jr., before it was passed onto John S. Riggs in 1864. In 1920, the house was threatened with demolition to make way for a gas station. In response, a group of Charlestonians organized a preservation group which would become the Preservation Society of Charleston.

A series of complicated legal entanglements ensued, and in 1933 the Manigault House was auctioned for non-payment of taxes. Princess Henrietta Guerard (Pollitzer) Hartford Pignatelli of Wando Plantation, and former wife of A&P heir Edward Hartford became interested in saving Manigault House. She purchased the house and presented it to the Charleston Museum. E. Milby Burton, then Director of the Museum, persuaded Standard Oil Company to donate the garden property for restoration.

The house then sat idle due to lack of funds. During World War II, the U.S.O. occupied and restored the house. The first floor was used to serve coffee and donuts, the second floor for recreation, and the third as a dormitory.

The house was opened to the public in 1948, and furnishings were added slowly over the next thirty years. As a historic house museum, the Joseph Manigault House is presently one of the city's major attractions.

== See also ==
- List of National Historic Landmarks in South Carolina
- National Register of Historic Places listings in Charleston, South Carolina
