= Willard Hirsch =

American sculptor

Willard Newman Hirsch
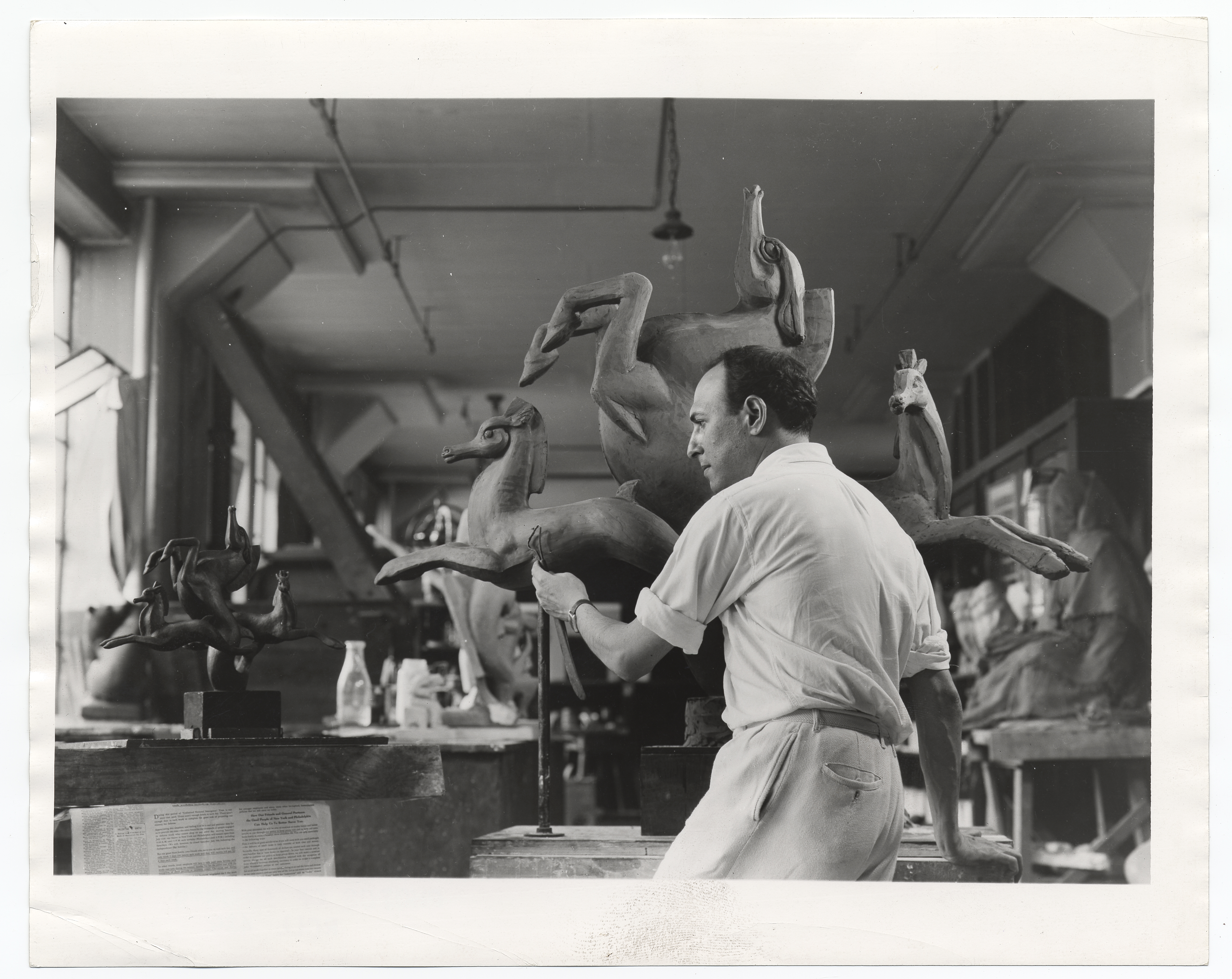
- Willard Newman Hirsch, from the Archives of American Art
- Born: 1905; Charleston, South Carolina
- Died: 1982 (aged 76–77); Charleston, South Carolina
- Education: College of Charleston, Beaux-Arts Institute of Design
- Known for: Sculpture

Willard Newman Hirsch (1905–1982) was an American sculptor.

== Life ==
He studied at the College of Charleston, and the Beaux-Arts Institute of Design. He exhibited at the National Academy of Design. He taught at the College of Charleston, the Gibbes Museum of Art School and the Charleston Art School (1953–1964) with William Melton Halsey and Corrie McCallum. He had a studio at 2 Queen Street.

His work is held by Brookgreen Gardens, Newberry College, Charleston County Library, Clemson House.

His papers are held at the College of Charleston.
