= Merton Simpson =

American painter (1928–2013)

Merton D. Simpson
- Born: Merton Daniel Simpson; September 20, 1928; Charleston, South Carolina, U.S.
- Died: March 9, 2013 (aged 84); Manhattan, New York
- Education: New York University, Cooper Union Art School, Gibbes Museum of Art
- Known for: Painter, Tribal Art Dealer, Jazz Musician
- Movement: Abstract expressionism

Merton Daniel Simpson (September 20, 1928 – March 9, 2013) was an American abstract expressionist painter and African and tribal art collector and dealer.

== Early life ==
Merton D. Simpson was born in Charleston, South Carolina. Between the ages of six and eleven he spent much of his time in and out of hospitals receiving treatment for diphtheria and rheumatic fever. During this time he started to doodle and sketch to pass the time. His interest in art grew and he began drawing and sketching in earnest. At the age of 13 Simpson was discovered by local artist William Halsey who took Simpson under his wing. For the next four years, Halsey taught Simpson the basics of painting and introduced him to the concept of abstract art. Jean Robertson Fleming, another local artist, was also instrumental in discovering Simpson's talent and helping him hone his skills.

In the midst of a still segregated South, Simpson was not allowed to take art classes at the city-run Gibbes Museum of Art where artist William Melton Halsey worked. Simpson frequently went in to privately work with his mentor Halsey. Simpson attended Burke High School in Charleston. After graduating in 1949 Halsey, his wife Corrie McCallum, and former director of the Charleston Museum Laura Bragg sponsored Merton D. Simpson's first solo art show. Two receptions for the art show were held; "one for whites and one for whites who didn't mind coming to a reception with blacks."

== Education ==
Simpson became the first African American to receive a prestigious five-year fellowship from the Charleston Scientific and Cultural Education fund and left South Carolina in 1949 for New York City after he finished high school. He attended New York University (NYU) for the first year and got accepted by Cooper Union. He took classes at NYU during the day and Cooper Union at night. Simpson also got a job at the frame shop of Herbert Benevy. Many well-known artists came to the frame shop and in time critiqued Simpson's work and developed a relationship with him. At NYU Simpson became acquainted with Hale Woodruff, William Baziotes and Robert Motherwell. The New York School was also having its impact during that time and Merton D. Simpson came in close contact with Franz Kline, Max Weber and Willem de Kooning at the frame shop. Out of all the colleges Simpson attended in New York, he credited the frame shop for giving him his real education.

== Air Force ==
Simpson enlisted in the Air Force in 1951 and went to Griffiss Air Force Base near Utica, New York for basic training. He did a portrait of base commander General Howell and assigned him to Special Service. Simpson also played in the Air Force Band, but was told that there was a greater need for artists. His title was official Air Force artist and he spent his time in service painting a number of military commanders including Chief of Staff General Nathan Farragut Twining and General Dwight D. Eisenhower who paid Simpson $100 for painting his portrait. When asked if he wanted to take a commission Simpson said that he wanted to go home to visit his ailing mother where he thought he would be of more use. His wish was granted. Some of his paintings are still on display in the Pentagon.

== Simpson as artist and gallerist ==
After four years in the service, Simpson went back to NYU to resume his work. In 1951 his work appeared in an exhibition at the Museum of Modern Art and in 1954 his work was displayed in the Younger American Painters exhibition at the Guggenheim Museum. As his reputation grew his artwork made exhibitions at a number of galleries in New York City and even Washington, DC. By 1955 Simpson had a one-person exhibition at the Bertha Schaefer Gallery. As Simpson became more established in New York he also became interested in the School of Paris and established a residence in the capitol. The new environment had a clear and direct impact on his painting style which had been greatly shaped by the brush painters of the New York School. Simpson divided his time between Paris and New York where he set up his own gallery in the 1950s. The Merton D. Simpson Gallery of Modern and Tribal Arts is famous for its exceptional collection of Tribal arts, and for artworks by his contemporaries Romare Bearden, Beauford Delaney, Norman Lewis, Charles Alston, Hale Woodruff and John Biggers, among others.

== The Spiral Group ==
Simpson was a member of the historic Spiral (arts alliance) which was formed by fellow artists and colleagues Romare Bearden, Charles Alston, Norman Lewis (artist), and Hale Woodruff on July 5, 1963. The purpose of Spiral was to gather African-American artists to discuss political and social issues, the Civil Rights Movement. The group was formed in part as a response to A. Philip Randolph's call for a "new visual order" that would be created in part by artists' contribution to the Black Freedom struggle. Members of the group worked together to obtain buses to travel to the March on Washington in 1963. The focus of the group shifted from a more explicit political trend to one that was more aesthetic and artistic. Bearden introduced Spiral members to collage work and the black and white artwork the group created reflected the political turmoil of the time. From July to October 2011, The Studio Museum in Harlem held an exhibition of selected works from the Spiral group members, including works by Mr. Simpson.

== Confrontation series ==
The 1960s created yet another shift in Simpson's style. The social and political movements of the decade in general and the Harlem Riot of 1964 which Simpson witnessed firsthand had a particular impact on his painting. The artist responded by creating the "Confrontation" series of paintings which featured schematized black and white faces inter-meshed in an intense encounter. From November 2010 to April 2011, the Greenville County Museum of Art exhibited Mr. Simpson's "Confrontation" series and purchased works for their permanent collection. https://www.youtube.com/watch?v=5-kdfbVZ8GU

== African and tribal art dealer ==
Simpson was drawn to African and tribal art after seeing some sculptures that Paul Robeson, Julius Carl Clark, and Hale Woodruff had in their personal collections. Simpson purchased his first African carving in 1949. He learned much about African and tribal art by visiting the gallery of Julius Carlebach, a dealer in rare items. It was primarily Hale Woodruff's influence that drove Simpson's interest in African art. Simpson began collecting and dealing modern artists alongside the traditional indigenous works of art from Africa. His early art collection consisted of modern artists whose artwork was influenced by traditional African art such as Pablo Picasso, Amedeo Modigliani, Alberto Giacometti and Paul Klee. As his knowledge and experience in the field grew he eventually became known as one of the most prominent dealers of traditional African art in the world and the international art world at large. In the spring of 2016, the Fowler Museum held an exhibition titled “The Collector and the Dealer: Gifts of African Art from Jay T. Last and Merton D. Simpson” highlighting exceptional gifts Art donated by Jay T. Last and Merton D. Simpson who were long-time friends and collaborators.

== Musician ==
Along with art, Simpson has always possessed a deep passion for music which has at times complemented his artwork. He learned to play the saxophone, tenor sax, clarinet and flute as a youth in Charleston. Simpson played with the famed Jenkins Orphanage Band. Later in life he played with various jazz groups, ensembles and musicians including George Coleman and Harold Mabern.

== Personal life ==
Merton D. Simpson married Beatrice Houston, his childhood sweetheart from South Carolina in 1954. Merton D. Simpson and Beatrice had two sons, Merton Simpson Jr. born in 1954, and Kenneth Simpson, born in 1959. Merton and Beatrice Simpson divorced in 2008. He was survived by his two sons.

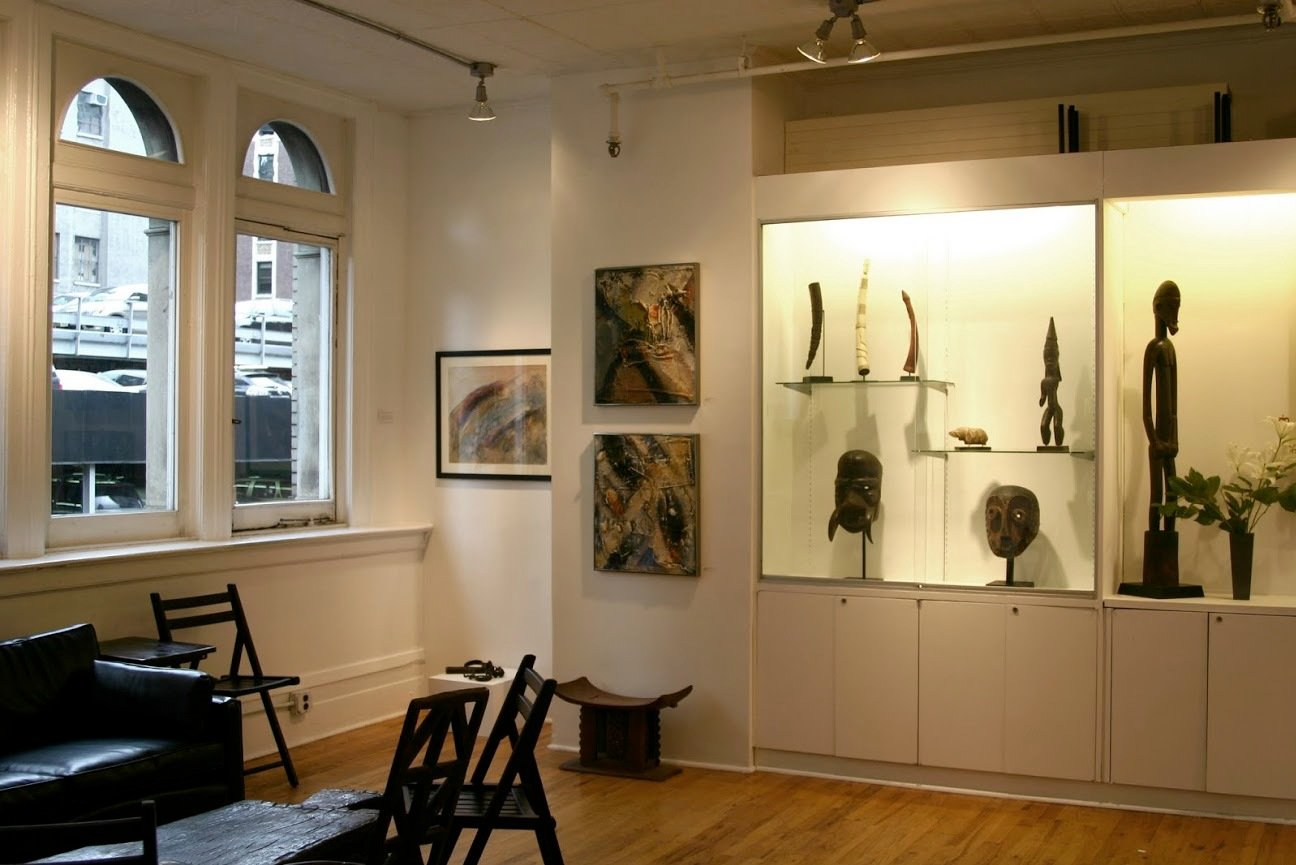
Merton D. Simpson Gallery on 28th St. in New York City, 2011

== The Merton D. Simpson Gallery ==
In 1954, Simpson opened a gallery on Madison Avenue, which featured African and Modern art, and in 2000, the Merton D. Simpson Gallery moved to 38 West 28th Street in the Chelsea neighborhood of Manhattan. The gallery held a large collection of African and tribal art, Modern art, and Merton D. Simpson's original works on paper and paintings.

== The Merton D. Simpson Gallery resurgence ==
After a brief illness and Merton D. Simpson's retirement in 2008, Mr. Simpson appointed long-time friend and art collector Raymond McGuire as Power of Attorney and Executor of his estate. In the fall of 2008, Juliette Pelletier was selected as the Director of the Merton D. Simpson Gallery, which, at the time, needed significant renovations and sales to continue operations. Under Ms. Pelletier's leadership, the gallery was able to become successfully operational by mid-2009, including multiple transactions, collaborations, and partnerships with museums, auction houses, galleries, foundations, and collectors internationally. Extensive interest ensued for Mr. Simpson, his artwork, and his collection. In 2010, Mr. Simpson received an Honorary Doctorate of Humane Letters from the College of Charleston, his artwork and select items from his collection featured in the "Divine Influences" exhibition at the Wilmer Jennings Gallery in New York City, a fifty-year solo retrospective exhibition at Hampton III Gallery in South Carolina, and had a major museum exhibition of his "Confrontation" paintings at the Greenville County Museum of Art among other milestones that year. In May 2011, Merton D. Simpson and the gallery Director Juliette Pelletier collaborated in curating the 'Encore!' exhibition in the newly renovated space, which included a 50-year retrospective of Merton D. Simpson's own artwork in conjunction with key objects from his collection of Tribal art. Also on display was his saxophone, with which he had performed with many famous jazz musicians since the 50's. The exhibition received accolades and led to significant purchases of Merton D. Simpsons work by the Smithsonian American Art Museum, the Greenville County Museum of Art, the Studio Museum in Harlem, and the Brooklyn Museum of Art for their permanent collections.

== The Merton D. Simpson Gallery dispute ==
In early 2012, Merton D. Simpson's son, Merton Simpson Jr., attained Power of Attorney, fired key staff, and assumed control of the gallery, the collection, and all of his father's business and personal assets. He filed for a failed legal guardianship of his father subsequently leading to financial challenges, the gallery's closure, and legal disputes within the family and with the court-appointed legal guardian Ann Pinciss Berman up to and after Mr. Simpson's death on March 9, 2013. The financial and legal disputes led to the delay of Mr. Simpson's burial however with the assistance of the Artists' Fellowship, and donations made by fellow artists and musicians, Merton D. Simpson was laid to rest in Charleston, SC on March 22, 2013.

In 2016, the New York County Public Administrator, which served as fiduciary of the Simpson estate, appointed Quinn's Auction Galleries to auction Merton D. Simpson's collection of over 2000 pieces.

== New York Times Obituary ==
On March 14, 2013, Bruce Weber wrote a comprehensive obituary and tribute honoring Merton D. Simpson and his many accomplishments.

== Featured Exhibitions of Merton D. Simpson's original artworks ==
- 1944 Barnett-Aden Gallery, Washington, DC
- 1952 Metropolitan Museum of Art, New York, NY
- 1954 Solomon R. Guggenheim Museum, New York, NY - "Younger American Painters"
- 1956 Museum of Art, University of Michigan, Ann Arbor, MI - "Eight New York Painters"
- 1960 Krasner Gallery, New York, NY
- 1978 Edward Merrin Gallery, New York, NY
- 1979 Huntsville Museum of Art, Huntsville, AB - "Black Artists/South"
- 1982 Langston Society, New York, NY
- 1983 Charleston County Library, Charleston, SC
- 1983 Allan Stone Gallery, New York, NY
- 1984 Simon Center for the Arts, Charleston, SC
- 1986 Bucknell University, Lewisburg, PA - "Since the Harlem Renaissance"
- 1990 Twinning Gallery, New York, NY
- 1992 Noir d’Ivoire Gallery, Paris, France
- 1993 Tambaran Gallery, New York, NY
- 1995 Gibbes Museum of Art, Charleston, SC - “The Journey of an Artists”
- 2009 Opalka Gallery, Albany, NY
- 2010 Anita Shapolsky Gallery, New York, NY - "African American Abstract Masters"
- 2010 Greenville County Museum of Art, Greenville, SC – "Confrontation" Series
- 2010 Hampton III Gallery, Greenville, SC – Retrospective curated by Sandy Rupp and Juliette Pelletier
- 2010 Wilmer Jennings Gallery at Kenkeleba House, New York, NY – "Divine Influences: Past and Present, Contemporary Abstract Art and African Sculpture" - curated by Joe Overstreet, Corinne Jennings, and Juliette Pelletier
- 2011 Merton D. Simpson Gallery, New York – "Encore!" tribute and exhibition curated by Juliette Pelletier and Karen Tuominen
- 2011 Bill Hodges Gallery, New York, NY
- 2011 Brooklyn Museum of Art, New York, NY
- 2011 Studio Museum in Harlem, New York, NY - "Spiral: Perspectives on an African-American Art" organized by Lauren Haynes, Assistant Curator, in collaboration with Emily G. Hanna, PhD, Curator of the Arts of Africa and Americas at the Birmingham Museum of Art.
- 2014 Greenville County Museum of Art, Greenville, SC - "South Carolina Icons"
- 2017 The Detroit Institute of Arts, Detroit, MI - "Art of Rebellion: Black Art of the Civil Rights Movement"
- 2021 Bill Hodges Gallery, New York, NY - "The Summer Exhibition" a group exhibition featuring the gems of the Bill Hodges collection
- 2021 Greenville County Museum of Art, Greenville, SC - "Soul Deep: African American Masterworks"
