= Margaret Ashley-Towle =

American archaeologist

Margaret Elizabeth Ashley-Towle
- Born: Atlanta, Georgia, U.S.
- Other name: Margaret Ashley
- Education: Oglethorpe University (A.B.); Columbia University (Ph.D.)
- Occupations: Archaeologist, Ethnobotanist
- Employer(s): Emory University, Harvard Botanical Museum
- Known for: Early American archaeology Ethnobotany of Pre-Columbian Peru
- Spouse: Gerald Towle (m. 1930; d. 1944)

Margaret Elizabeth Ashley-Towle (née Ashley; 1902 – November 2, 1985) was a pioneering female American archaeologist. Her research encompassed several sites in Georgia, USA.

== Education and career ==
Margaret Elizabeth Ashley was born in Atlanta, Georgia to Claude Lordawick Ashley, a chief of the Atlanta city council, and Elizabeth Miller, the daughter of Captain Hiram Miller, a veteran of the Federal army. After graduating from Oglethorpe University in Atlanta with an A.B. in English literature and a minor in journalism in 1924, she enrolled in Columbia University, pursuing a graduate degree in anthropology. While at Columbia, she studied under Franz Boas. In 1926, she began work at what is now known as the Shinholser site (9Bl12) in Baldwin County, Georgia as her dissertation topic.

In July 1927, she began working on her master's thesis topic, "An Archaeological Survey of Georgia". One of the trustees of the Highlands Museum at the Highlands Biological Station invited Ashley to the Museum in summer of 1928. Accession records from the museum indicate that Ashley receive objects July 10-20, 1928. She also accessed objects from the Cleaveland Collection of the museum. She collaborated with Helen McCormack in cataloging materials. On August 12, Ashley was appointed to the Museum's Advisory Committee. Her catalog, a handwritten inventory is on display ath the Highlands Biological Station Nature Center.

By September of 1927, already recognized as an expert in her field, Ashley was asked to organize a department of archaeology for Emory University and to represent Emory in Warren K. Moorehead's excavations at the Etowah site in northern Georgia. Ashley accepted this position and left her official studies at Columbia. Ashley is listed as the Research Associate in Southeast Archaeology at the Robert S. Peabody Institute of Arachaeology 1929-1930.

While working for Emory, Ashley, along with Frank T. Schnell Sr., performed significant excavations at Lockett Mound, now known as the Neisler site (9Tr1), located near the Flint River. Ashley and Schnell spent three weeks at Neisler, performing major trench excavation atop the mound and surveying 250 test units. Two fire pits were uncovered on the mound and fourteen burials excavated in the outlying area. Ashley's analysis of ceramics from the site are in the official site publication, the Etowah Papers. The Michael C. Carlos Museum at Emory University houses the collections excavated by Moorehead, Towle and Ashley.

On February 18, 1930, Ashley married Gerald Towle, a Harvard graduate and Moorehead's top field assistant. Upon her marriage, Margaret abandoned archaeology for some fourteen years, never to resume field work in Georgia. In 1944, after being widowed, she started volunteering at the Harvard Botanical Museum. In the late 1940s, she returned to the graduate program in anthropology at Columbia, this time focusing on ethnobotany and working with Duncan Strong.

In 1958, Ashley completed her dissertation, The Ethnobotany of Pre-Columbian Peru as Evidenced by Archaeological Materials, and received her Ph.D. Upon completing her studies at Columbia, Ashley-Towle worked for the Harvard Botanical Museum as an unpaid associate until her death on November 2, 1985.
