= Ned I.R. Jennings =

American abstract artist

Edward "Ned" I.R. Jennings (May 16, 1898 – May 7, 1929) was an artist of the Charleston Renaissance era, one of the first abstract artists in the city.

== Biography ==
Edward "Ned" I.R. Jennings was born on May 16, 1898, in Washington, D.C., but was just few weeks old the family moved to Charleston, where his father was the postmaster. Jennings' father also helped to develop Folly Beach.

Jennings trained for service in World War I at the Porter Military Academy, but was discharged because he was born with a cleft palate. He entered the medical corps in 1919 and went to France. He was gassed, recovered in England and went back to Charleston.

At first he attended College of Charleston, but then moved to Columbia University and Carnegie Technical Institute, where he studied art, stagecraft and design. In 1927 he went to Paris and studied privately with Mela Meuter and Walter Renee Fuerst. Back in Charleston, Jennings was one of the first abstract artists in the city and had his studio inside the Confederate Home at 62 Broad Street, Charleston. His mentor was Laura Bragg, a museum director who became the first woman to run a publicly funded art museum in America when she was named the director of the Charleston Museum in 1920. Jennings was a member of the junior section of the Natural History Society as a child and assisted Bragg with the natural history collection at the museum. Jennings was an assistant curator of the museum.

A gay man, many of his works include homoerotic themes; most of them are housed at the Gibbes Museum of Art. He published in the College of Charleston Magazine, and was an influence on the painter William Halsey.

Ned I.R. Jennings died by suicide on May 7, 1929, aged 30 after the bad end of a relationship with another man. He staged his death on his studio on Broad Street as it was one of the stage sets he designed: near his body there was a Bible, an empty bottle of champagne and a gun.

== Exhibitions ==
- A Lonely Soul, The Art of Edward Jennings, Gibbes Museum of Art.

== Legacy ==
Harlan Greene in the novel Why We Never Danced the Charleston based the character of Ned Grimke on Jennings.
