= Edward Jennings =

Edward Jennings may refer to:

- Edward Jennings (VC) (1820–1889), Irish recipient of the Victoria Cross
- Edward Jennings (rowing) (1898–1975), American coxswain
- Ned I.R. Jennings (1898–1929), American painter and set designer
- Edward H. Jennings (1937–2019), president of Ohio State University
- Edward Jennings (MP) (c. 1647–1725), English politician, MP for East Looe 1713–15
- Ed Jennings (born 1968), Florida politician
