= Brian Rutenberg =

American painter (born 1965)

- Born: Brian Christopher Rutenberg; September 18, 1965 (age 60); Myrtle Beach, South Carolina, U.S.
- Education: BFA from College of Charleston, MFA School of Visual Arts, New York
- Known for: Abstract painting
- Movement: Abstraction, Landscape Painting
- Awards: Basil H. Alkazzi Award, Fulbright Scholarship

Brian Christopher Rutenberg (born September 18, 1965, in Myrtle Beach, South Carolina) is an American abstract painter.

Rutenberg received his BFA from the College of Charleston in 1987 and his MFA from the School of Visual Arts in New York City in 1989. He currently lives and works in New York City.

== Early life ==
Brian Rutenberg was born on September 18 in Myrtle Beach, South Carolina, the first of three sons, to John and Sandra Rutenberg. He attended private school at Myrtle Beach's Coastal Academy from 1974 through 1983. After demonstrating a long-term interest in drawing, Rutenberg began after school watercolor classes, and conducted his own experiments with acrylic paints. In 1983 Rutenberg began his studies at the College of Charleston, where he met and studied under abstract painter William Melton Halsey. Also during college, Rutenberg took classes with British abstract painter Michael Tyzack, who became his faculty advisor and close friend. In 1986 Rutenberg listened for the first time to Glenn Gould's 1981 second recording of J.S. Bach's Goldberg Variations, which launched the artist's deep and lasting interest in the late Canadian pianist's music and philosophy. Rutenberg graduated with honors from College of Charleston in 1987 and moved to New York, where he entered the MFA program at the School of Visual Arts, New York.

== Career ==
.In 1989 Francis Marion University Art Gallery in Florence, South Carolina presented the artist's first solo exhibition. Rutenberg was awarded the Basil H. Alkazzi Award in 1991, which enabled him to study in Rome, Bologna and Venice, Italy for three weeks where he studied the works of Annibale Carracci, Bernini and Tiepolo. Inspired by 17th- and 18th-century Italian ceiling paintings and the Villa d'Este near Rome, Rutenberg began his River Paintings series.

In 1992 Rutenberg was awarded a year-long Marie Walsh Sharpe Art Foundation Grant. One year later, the artist had his first New York solo exhibition, River Paintings, at Cavin-Morris Gallery. During the same year the Greenville County Museum of Art in Greenville, South Carolina organized Rutenberg's first museum exhibition.

In 1994, Rutenberg started to take trips to Toronto and Ottawa, Canada to closely study Glenn Gould’s life and career. He traveled to Canada annually for this purpose until 2002. Inspired by Gould and his music, Rutenberg enrolled in music history classes at New York's Juilliard School.

In 1997 Rutenberg received a Fulbright Fellowship which afforded him the opportunity to spend a year in Ireland.

Rutenberg had his first solo exhibition with Forum Gallery in Los Angeles in 2000. Forum Gallery, New York became Rutenberg's primary representative.

In 2018 Rutenberg received an Honorary Doctorate Degree from the College of Charleston, Charleston, SC.

== Major exhibitions ==
- 1993 The Greenville County Museum of Art in Greenville, South Carolina organized the artist's first museum exhibition.
- 2001 The Butler Institute of American Art in Youngstown, Ohio created the solo exhibition: Brian Rutenberg: A Ten-Year Survey.
- 2006 The South Carolina State Museum in Columbia, South Carolina, organized a major retrospective, Brimming Tides: Paintings and Drawings by Brian Rutenberg.
- 2009 The Gibbes Museum of Art in Charleston, South Carolina organized Brian Rutenberg: Tidesong,
- 2009 Radius Books published the artist's monograph Brian Rutenberg, featuring written contributions from Martica Sawin and artist Gregory Amenoff.
- 2011 Rutenberg's work was the subject of an exhibition at the Burroughs-Chapin Museum of Art, Myrtle Beach, South Carolina.

== Awards ==
- 2018 Honorary Doctorate Degree from the College of Charleston, Charleston, SC
- 2004 Fellowship in Painting, New York Foundation for the Arts
- 2002 Spring Island Trust Award
- 2000 Peter S. Reed Foundation Award

Sea Island Trust Visiting Artist

- 1997 Fulbright Scholarship

Artists Work Programme Studio Grant, Irish Museum of Modern Art

- 1993 Marie Walsh Sharpe Art Foundation]
- 1991 The Basil H. Alkazzi Award (USA)

Ragdale Foundation Fellowship

- 1988 MFA Scholarship Award, School of Visual Arts
- 1987 Laura Bragg Memorial Award

== Technique ==
Rutenberg has long placed primary importance on surface and material. His works from 1983 to 1989 included non traditional materials like cardboard, wire, masking tape, and were fashioned into shaped three-dimensional paintings and environments. From 1990 to 1995 he experimented with puncturing the picture plane with various sized holes in homage to the paintings of Lucio Fontana. Rutenberg is known for his liberal use of oil paint, sometimes up to three inches thick, and believes that a painting must address the physical presence of the viewer first.

== Selected collections ==
- Art Museum of Myrtle Beach, Myrtle Beach, South Carolina
- Butler Institute of American Art, Youngstown, Ohio
- Cameron Art Museum, Wilmington, North Carolina
- College of Charleston Foundation, South Carolina
- Gibbes Museum of Art, Charleston, South Carolina
- Greenville County Museum of Art, Greenville, South Carolina
- Herbert F. Johnson Museum of Art, Cornell University, Ithaca, New York
- Hunter Museum of American Art, Chattanooga, Tennessee
- Morris Museum of Art, Augusta, Georgia
- Naples Museum of Art, Naples, Florida
- Nassau County Museum of Art, Roslyn Harbor, New York
- Ogden Museum of Southern Art, New Orleans, Louisiana
- Peabody Essex Museum, Salem, Massachusetts
- South Carolina State Museum, Columbia, South Carolina
- School of Visual Art and Design at the University of South Carolina, Columbia, South Carolina
- Springfield Museum of Art, Springfield, Ohio
- Yale University Art Gallery, New Haven, Connecticut

== Selected bibliography ==
- Baker, Kevin. Brian Rutenberg is on a brave quest for freedom in color" (review). San Francisco Chronicle, February 11, 2006.
- Bendin, Dariel. "Local Boy Makes Good". Myrtle Beach Alternatives, February 27, 2009.
- Brownfield, Paul. "Gould variations". Sun News (Myrtle Beach, South Carolina), January 5, 1997.
- Day, Jeffrey. "Going with the Flow" (review). The State (Columbia, South Carolina). January 17, 1993.
- De Santis, Solange. "A Glenn Gould Gathering". The Wall Street Journal, October 7, 1999.
- Drake, Nicholas. "Rutenberg’s Imagination Soars with Oil and Canvas". The Post and Courier, (South Carolina), March 21, 1996.
- Ebony, David. (review). Art in America, May 1994.
- Johnson, Ken. "For a Broad Landscape, an Equally Wide Survey". The New York Times, May 31, 2006.
- Lang, Sandy. "MB Artist wins Alkazzi Award". The Sun News, December 21, 1991.
- Lucas, Scott. "Lush, Lusty Landscapes". Creative Loafing Magazine, 2003.
- Melrod, George. "Abstract Visions". Art & Antiques, November 1996.
- Sawin, Martica. Brian Rutenberg. Preface by Gregory Amenoff, Introduction by Walter Darby Bannard. Radius Books. 2009. ISBN 9781934435090
- Smith, Nick. "For painter Brian Rutenberg, the waiting isn't the hardest part: The Prince of Tides". Charleston City Paper, November 9, 2009.
- Sozanksi, Edward J. "Uncommon Dignity for Common People". The Philadelphia Inquirer, February 18, 2000.
