= Helen Gardner McCormack =

Helen Gardner McCormack (March 17, 1903 – January 22, 1974) was the director of the Valentine Museum, archivist and curator for the South Carolina Historical Society and director of the Gibbes Museum of Art.

== Biography ==
Helen Gardner McCormack was born on March 17, 1903, in Charleston, the daughter of William Henry McCormack (1868–1940) and Alice Broome (1871-1948).

She attended the College of Charleston and graduated in 1925 with an A.B. in English. She did postgraduate work at Columbia University. In 1936 she received a Rockefeller Foundation grant to study museum methods at the Brooklyn Museum and in Europe. In 1942 she received a fellowship from the Charleston Scientific and Cultural Educational Fund to reorganize the South Carolina Historical Society records and documents.

From 1926 to 1928 she was curator of South Carolina collection at the Charleston Museum. In 1928 she helped organizing the Valentine Museum in Richmond, Virginia and from 1930 to 1940 she was its director. During this time she completed the restoration of the 1812 Wickham-Valentine House designed by Alexander Parris. She served on the museum committee of the Virginia Academy of Science and on the board of the Virginia Art Alliance. In 1941 she became assistant director at the Gibbes Museum of Art in Charleston. From 1942 to 1944 she was archivist for the South Carolina Historical Society in Charleston, South Carolina. In 1947 she was named curator of collections at the Charleston Museum. From 1954 to 1966 she was director of the Gibbes Museum of Art in Charleston. At retirement from directorship in 1966 she remained at the Gibbes Museum of Art as curator. In 1954 she became archivist for the Guild of South Carolina Artists and in 1968 she became its executive director.

In 1941 she undertook the Charleston architectural survey, recording information of 1380 historic properties. The survey was suggested by Frederick Law Olmsted Jr. and was conducted by the Carolina Art Association with funding from the Carnegie Corporation. It was published in 1944 as This is Charleston.

McCormack was the companion of Laura Bragg, the director of the Charleston Museum. McCormack lived at the Confederate Home, 62 Broad Street.

Helen Gardner McCormack died on January 22, 1974, and is buried at Magnolia Cemetery, Charleston.

The H. F. Plowden Weston (1738–1827) miniature, dating from 1824, by Charles Fraser, was purchased by the Gibbes Museum with funds provided by the Eliza Huger Kammerer Fund in memory of Helen Gardner McCormack.
