= Mary Amarinthia Snowden =

American philanthropist (1819–1898)

Mary Amarinthia Snowden (September 10, 1819- February 23, 1898) was a philanthropist who focused her efforts on aiding Confederate soldiers and their families. She founded the Ladies' Calhoun Monument Association, the Soldiers Relief Association of Charleston, the Ladies Memorial Association of Charleston, and the Home for the Mothers, Widows, and Daughters of Confederate Soldiers.

== Personal life ==
Mary Amarinthia Snowden was born on September 10, 1819, to Joseph Yates and Elizabeth Saylor in Charleston. When she was 18 months old, her father died and her family moved to Philadelphia. They stayed there for five years before returning to South Carolina. She attended a school at Barhamsville run by Elias Marks. Snowden and her brother Dr. William B. Yates worked together on a home where the poor could be educated and train to work as sailors as one of her first philanthropic activities.

She married Dr. William Snowden in 1857. They had two children, including future historian Yates Snowden. Dr. William Snowden died in the Civil War.

== Philanthropic efforts ==
Snowden was a close acquaintance of John C. Calhoun. In 1854, after John C. Calhoun died, she organized the Ladies' Calhoun Monument Association in Charleston, raising almost $40,000 by 1861. During the Civil War, Snowden sewed the funds into the skirt she was wearing when she fled Columbia in February 1865 in order to protect them. The money was then used to put up a monument of Calhoun in Marion Square in Charleston in April 1887.

In July 1861, she founded the Soldiers Relief Association of Charleston to help Confederate soldiers. It provided clothing and hospital stores to them. After the Battle of Second Manassas, she went to Warrenton, Virginia, to help those who were wounded on the battlefield. During the Siege of Charleston, she went to Columbia and remained there to aid hundreds of soldiers until they could return home. She returned to Charleston in 1865 to continue to help Confederate soldiers.

In 1866 she formed the Ladies Memorial Association of Charleston, which is considered to be the first of many similar organizations formed after the Civil War to commemorate the Confederate soldiers who died. The organization established May 10 as Memorial Day and put up one of the first monuments in the south to the Confederate soldiers who had died at Magnolia Cemetery. She also helped return the remains of South Carolina soldiers who were buried in the battlegrounds of other states.

After helping the wounded soldiers during the war, she became concerned about helping their families as well. With her sister Isabella, she founded the Home for the Mothers, Widows and Daughters of Confederate Soldiers in 1867. The building was on Broad Street in Charleston, and they mortgaged their own house in order to pay for the first year's rent. The home provided housing for poor female dependents of Confederate soldiers. For their children, the Confederate Home and College for girls was established in 1872. Snowden was the president of the board of control of the home until her death. She died at her home in Charleston on February 23, 1898.

== Legacy ==
In 1922, the college closed and the Home for the Mothers, Widows, and Daughters of Confederate Soldiers was changed to moderately priced housing in order to make housing affordable for qualified residents. The Confederate Home and College is a source of five college scholarships.
