= Pierre Bacot =

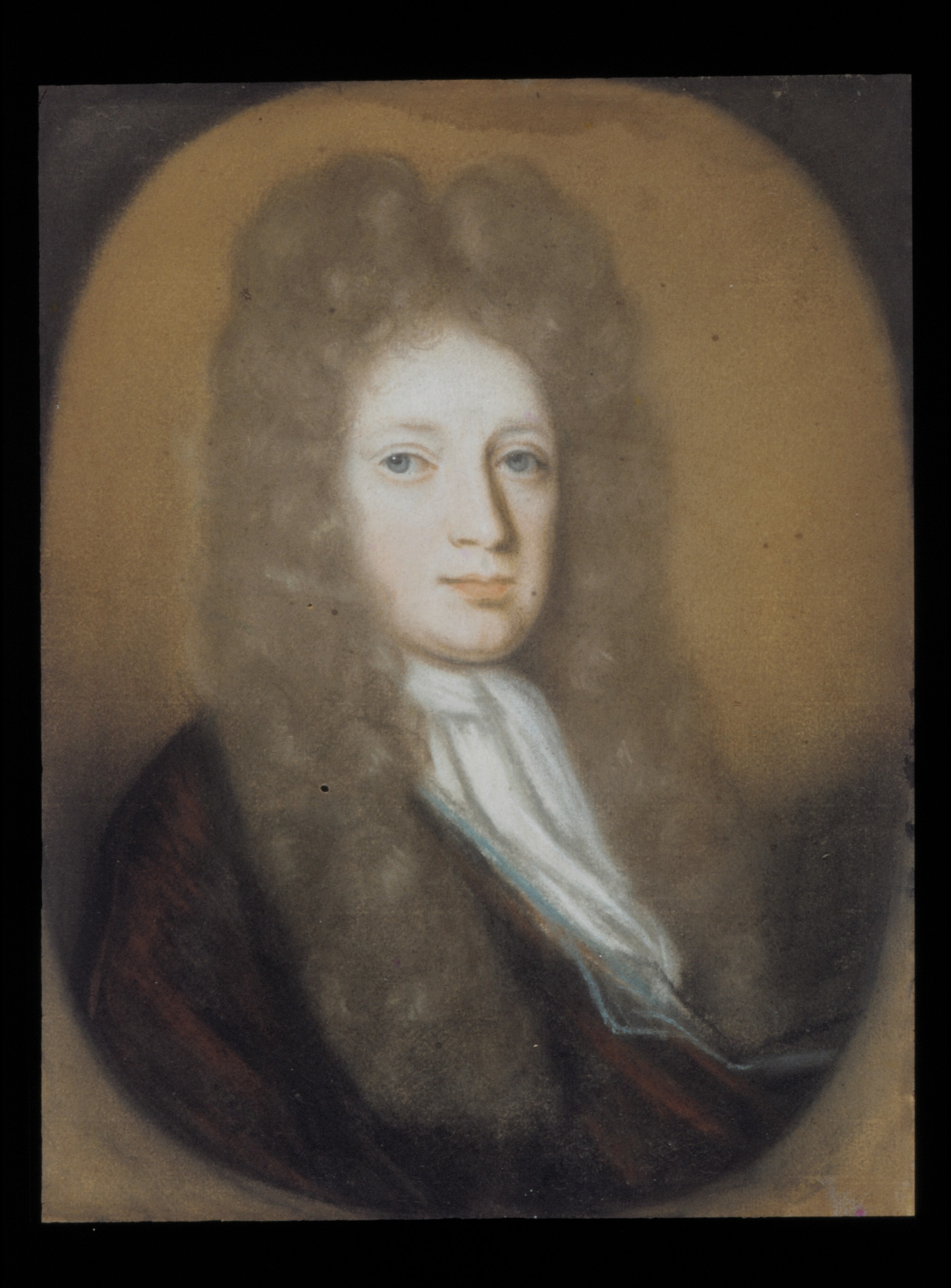
- Pierre Bacot by Henrietta Johnston ca. 1708-10
- Born: 15 November 1671; Tours, France
- Died: 18 March 1730 (aged 58); Charles Town, South Carolina
- Spouses: Marianne Fleur Du Gue, Marie Peronneau

Pierre Bacot (1671–1730) was a prominent French Huguenot planter in colonial South Carolina.

== Biography ==
Born in Tours, Touraine, France, Pierre was the son of Pierre Bacot (1637-1702) and Jacquine Mercier (1649-1709), and grandson of Pierre Bacot (1597-1637) and Jacqueline Menessier (1615-). To escape religious persecution after the Edict of Nantes, Pierre fled France with his parents and brother Daniel, arriving in Charles Town, South Carolina in 1685. The elder Pierre and wife Jacquine had a daughter Elizabeth, born 1694 in South Carolina (married Jonas Bonhost), and received land grants in 1699 and 1700 in St Andrews Parish, lands which became part of Middleton Place. The family became naturalized citizens about 1696.

This period of time was known as Le Refuge, after the Revocation of the Edict of Nantes, during which French Protestants were forbidden by Louis XIV to leave the country and were ordered to convert to Catholicism under penalty of death. The first 45 refugees to South Carolina arrived in Charles Town in 1680 aboard the Richmond, a British man-of-war. The Margaret arrived in 1685, followed by several other ships in the following years.

After his father's death, Pierre Bacot (1671-1730) and brother Daniel moved to Goose Creek, about 20 miles upriver from Charles Town on the Cooper River. In early colonial times Goose Creek became the home base of the “Goose Creek Men,” the politically and economically powerful faction that consistently challenged the authority of the Lords Proprietors in the colony. While white inhabitants were largely Anglican, many Huguenots were established there after 1700.

The Goose Creek men became leaders of the early Indian trade, and by the 1690s many held important offices in the colonial government. At first the Goose Creek men dealt mainly in Indian slaves, while later the deerskin trade dominated. Pierre Bacot primarily made his living through the buying and selling of land.

A granite cross placed on the site of a French church founded about 1682 near the headwaters of Goose Creek marks what was probably the third site settled by Huguenots in South Carolina.

== Family ==
Bacot first married Marianne Fleur du Gue, who died in 1716; they had no children. He then married Marie Peronneau (1685-1773). They had four children:

1. Samuel (1716-1771) married Rebecca Foissin and settled in Darlington District.

2. Mary (1717-1806) married Peter Allston.

3. Elizabeth (1725-1789) married Charles Dewar (1720-1775).

4. Peter (1728-1787) married Elizabeth Harramond, settled as a merchant in Charleston.

Bacot commissioned Henrietta Johnston to paint his portrait, one of his first wife Marianne, and one of his sister Elizabeth. The portrait of Bacot and the portrait of his wife Marianne were donated to the New York Metropolitan Museum of Art in 1947. Henrietta's husband, Rev. Gideon Johnston (1668–1716), Bishop of London’s Commissary in South Carolina, said of Charles Town in a letter to the Bishop of Salisbury in 1708, “I never repented so much of anything...as my coming to this Place”; “the People here...are the Vilest race of Men upon the Earth”; while in a 1709 report to the English church authorities, “were it not for the assistance my wife gives me by drawing of pictures (which can last but a little time in a place so ill peopled) I should not be able to live.”

== Notable descendants ==
- Samuel Bacot (1745-1795), grandson. Early land records indicate he settled in the back country of South Carolina about 1770. He served in the State Militia during the Revolution, was taken prisoner by the British in 1780, but with his companions made his escape, avoiding confinement in a Charles Town prison.
- Elizabeth Bacot, (about 1746-after 1808), granddaughter, sister to Samuel Bacot (1745-1795) married as his second wife, William Gause Jr (1746-1808). William and Elizabeth hosted President George Washington for breakfast on April 27, 1791 during his Southern Tour. The Gause house was located near Gause’s Landing on the west and sound side of Shallotte Inlet. Gause was a war veteran, having lost a leg in the Revolution, and had served in the North Carolina House of Commons in 1778.
- Thomas Wright Bacot (1765-1834), grandson, United States Postmaster of Charleston appointed by President George Washington, First Grand Master of the newly formed Grand Lodge of Ancient Free Masons of South Carolina (1817-1820), married Jane McPherson DeSaussure (1768-1801), buried Saint Philip's Episcopal Church cemetery, Charleston. Albert G. Mackey, physician and author of freemasonry books and articles, recorded that upon Thomas Wright's death in 1834, “Grand Lodge was ordered to be clothed in mourning for six months.”
- Dr Daniel DeSaussure Bacot (1828-1862), great-great grandson, married Rosa Taylor (1832-1925), was a graduate of Charleston Medical College in 1848, practiced at Piedmont and Orangeburg, South Carolina, and died in Pendleton, South Carolina.
- Ada White Bacot (1832-1911), great-great-great-granddaughter, widowed Confederate nurse 1861-1863. Ada, who was well educated for a Southern woman, owned 700-acre Arnmore, a legacy from her husband and second cousin Thomas Wainwright Bacot. They had been married five years when her husband was murdered by his overseer in 1856. Her two daughters each died at the age of two, leaving her a childless widow at age twenty-four. She moved back to her father’s plantation, Roseville, but decided to volunteer as a Confederate nurse at the outbreak of the war.
- Thomas Alfred Clarke (1864-1909), great-great-great-great grandson, partner in the McCown and Clarke Company, “Planters, Stock Raisers, and Merchants” in Florence South Carolina, established 1909.
