= Mary Roberts (painter) =

American artist (died 1761)

- Died: 1761
- Known for: Portrait miniaturist
- Spouse: Bishop Roberts

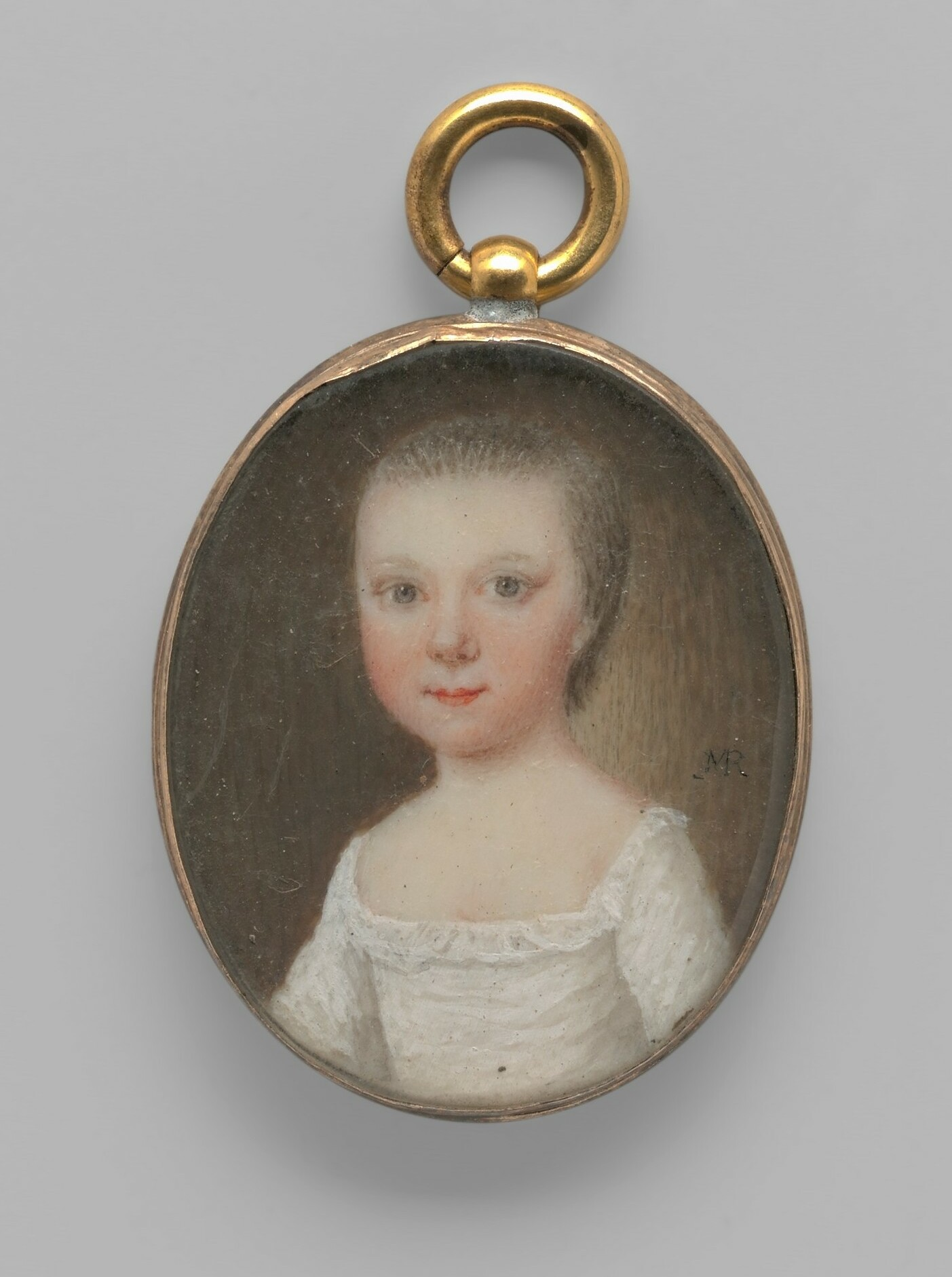
Henrietta Middleton, c. 1752-58, watercolor on ivory, in the collection of the Metropolitan Museum of Art

Mary Roberts (died 1761) was an American miniaturist active in Charleston, South Carolina in the 1740s and 1750s. One of the earliest American miniaturists, and the first woman recorded as working in the medium in the American colonies, she is also believed to have painted the first watercolor-on-ivory miniature in the colonies.

== Life ==
Almost nothing is known about Roberts' life; what little may be gleaned about her comes from advertisements run in the South Carolina Gazette and from the wills of her contemporaries. She was the wife of painter Bishop Roberts, who first advertised his services in the Gazette in 1735, and again two years later. He claimed to be able to paint portraits, landscapes, and heraldry; to offer drawings for sale; to paint houses; and to print engravings as well. He is best remembered for a view of Charleston which was engraved by W. H. Toms in 1739. Roberts died unexpectedly in 1740, in which year his wife's name appeared in newspaper notices for the first time. She provided a statement to the Gazette on her husband's death, further offering to provide "Face Painting well performed by the said Mary Roberts, who has several Pictures and a Printing-Press to dispose of"; no further written evidence exists to show that she worked as a miniaturist. In 1746 she again offered the printing press for sale. That she was continually suffering financial difficulties after her husband's death may be inferred from the will of one William Watkins, who on his death in 1747 left her fifty pounds for the support of her son. Upon the death of a friend in 1750 she received a bequest of clothing and furniture. Roberts herself died in 1761, and her burial is recorded in the register of St. Philip's Episcopal Church on October 24 of that year.

== Work ==
Only three miniatures by Roberts were currently known to exist until fairly recently; none is signed with her full name, but each is inscribed "MR". All are undated, but based on the styles of the clothing and wigs depicted are believed to date from the 1740s. The technique is assured enough to suggest that Roberts had some sort of formal training in painting prior to arriving in Charleston. At least one of the portraits, a watercolor on ivory rendering of a Woman of the Gibbes or Shoolbred Family, still exists in its original frame of gold set with garnets. This work descended through the Gibbes and Shoolbred families before coming to the Gibbes Museum of Art.

In 2006, five watercolor on ivory miniatures of children, a group of cousins from the Middleton family, were found at Shrublands (the family estate in England) and purchased by the Metropolitan Museum of Art in 2007. Each one measures 1 1/2 x 1 in. (3.8 x 2.5 cm) and is in its original gold case and signed MR and was painted around 1752 -1758. The portrait of Henrietta Middleton is on display at the museum.
