= William Melton Halsey =

American abstract artist (1915–1999)

- Halsey in 1981
- Born: William Melton Halsey; March 13, 1915; Charleston, South Carolina, U.S.
- Died: February 14, 1999 (aged 83); Charleston, South Carolina
- Education: University of South Carolina, School of the Museum of Fine Arts, Boston
- Movement: Abstract expressionism

William M. Halsey (1915–1999) was an influential abstract artist in the American Southeast, particularly in his home state of South Carolina. He was represented by the Bertha Schaefer Gallery in New York City (1948–53). His mural studies for the Baltimore Hebrew Congregational Temple were included in Synagogue Art Today at the Jewish Museum, New York City (1952). His work was included in the annual International Exhibition of Watercolors, the Art Institute of Chicago (1939, 1941–43). He had work in the Whitney Museum's Annual Exhibition of Contemporary American Sculpture, Watercolors and Drawings (1953). A mid-career retrospective was held at the Greenville County Museum of Art in 1972 and then traveled to the Gibbes Museum of Art (formerly the Gibbes Art Gallery), Charleston, South Carolina, and the Florence Museum, Florence, South Carolina.

== Early life ==
William Halsey was born in Charleston, South Carolina. His talent was evident at an early age, and he was encouraged by his mother, Eleanor Loeb Halsey. His first instructor was the local artist Elizabeth O'Neill Verner, who had studied at the Pennsylvania Academy of the Fine Arts and was one of the leading artists in the Charleston Renaissance. Another early influence was the local artist Edward I. R. Jennings, who had studied in New York City with Arthur Wesley Dow. It was from Jennings that the young Halsey learned about what was happening in the realm of modern art. After high school Halsey attended the University of South Carolina for two years. Realizing he was only interested in art, he sought another place to study where he could maintain his singular focus. He moved to Boston to study at the Boston Museum School (now called the School of the Museum of Fine Arts, Boston). His courses at the school were rigorous and included anatomy, perspective, composition, and drawing. He developed an interest in fresco and became sufficiently trained to be able to teach this technique at the school. He attended the school from 1935 to 1939.

In 1939 upon completing his study at the Museum School of Fine Arts, he was awarded a James William Paige Fellowship for 24 months of study and travel in Europe. With the outbreak of World War II on the horizon, Europe was not an option. As an alternative he was allowed to go to Mexico. He and his new wife, Corrie McCallum, sailed for Veracruz and then settled in Mexico City. The change of location to Mexico had a profound influence upon the young artist. Surrounded by weaving, pottery, and the colorful scenery in Mexico, he was drawn to this country and its ancient cultures. This interest only became deeper and more profound during his life.

== Return to Charleston ==
The young couple returned to South Carolina along with their first child, Eleanor Paige Halsey. Halsey took a teaching position as the director of the art school at the Telfair Academy (now the Telfair Museum of Art) in Savannah, Georgia. In 1945 the family, which now included their son, David Ashley Halsey, moved back to Charleston. Halsey became the director of the art classes held at the Gibbes Art Gallery (now Gibbes Museum of Art). Halsey chose to settle and to continue his artistic career in his hometown. A third child, Louise McCallum Halsey, was born in 1949.

During that time he befriended Merton Simpson, a young African-American teenager with an immense amount of talent. Due to segregation, Simpson was not allowed to take art classes at the Gibbes Museum where Halsey taught, so Halsey provided private instruction. After Simpson graduated from high school in 1949, Halsey, his wife Corrie McCallum, and former director of the Charleston Museum Laura Bragg sponsored Merton Simpson's first solo art show. Two receptions for the art show were held, "one for whites and one for whites who didn't mind coming to a reception with blacks." In his later works Halsey used fabrics from Africa that were packing materials around sculptures Simpson imported and sold in his gallery. The two artists maintained a lifelong friendship. In 2006 in a tribute for the catalog William Halsey: Mastery of the Modern, Merton Simpson wrote "I had the good fortune of growing up in Charleston when he was the top artist in the region, what a blessing."

== Exhibitions and awards ==
Halsey was chosen for many honors throughout his long career. While still a student at the Museum School of the Arts, Boston, a painting of his was selected for an exhibition at the Art Institute of Chicago. In 1939, having just graduated, he was offered a one-man exhibition at the Berkshire Museum in Pittsfield, Massachusetts, where he also completed a series of frescoes. The Gibbes Museum in Charleston gave Halsey a one-man exhibition in 1940 that traveled to the Norfolk Museum and the Lynchburg Art Gallery in Virginia. In 1972 the Greenville County Museum of Art in Greenville SC curated an exhibition and published an accompanying monograph, "William M. Halsey: Retrospective". The monograph covered four decades of work by this artist whom the director of the Greenville County Museum of Art, Jack A. Morris Jr, described as "a pioneer of abstract painting in the South and a nationally recognized talent."

In 1953 Halsey, his wife Corrie McCallum, and local sculptor Willard Hirsch joined to form the independent Charleston Art School which they operated from 1953 to 1964. The school offered classes to all ages in both 2D and 3D processes. In 1965 Halsey started his university teaching career, as the founding faculty for the studio art program at the College of Charleston. During that time among the many students he taught, Brian Rutenberg was one who graduated and went on to establish his career in New York City. Halsey taught at the college from 1965 to 1984. In 1984 upon his retirement from teaching at the College of Charleston, the gallery at the Simons Fine Arts Center (now the Halsey Institute) was named in his honor. Mark Sloan, director and chief curator at the Halsey Institute, has chosen to focus on work by contemporary under-known artists with significant exceptions like a recent exhibition of prints by Jasper Johns and work by Shepard Fairey.

Halsey was awarded an honorary degree from the College of Charleston in 1995. In 1999 he received posthumously the Elizabeth O'Neill Verner Governor's Award for the Arts, for Lifetime Achievement, which is the highest award in the arts given in South Carolina.

Featured exhibitions of William M. Halsey artwork:

- 1939 Berkshire Museum, Pittsfield, Massachusetts
- 1939 Eighteenth International Watercolor Exhibition, Art Institute of Chicago, Chicago, Illinois
- 1940 Gibbes Museum, Charleston, South Carolina
- 1942 Telfair Academy of Art, Savannah, Georgia
- 1948 Bertha Schaefer Gallery, New York
- 1951 Bertha Schaefer Gallery, New York, solo
- 1952 Third Annual American Watercolors, Drawings and Prints Exhibition, Metropolitan Museum of Art, New York City
- 1953 Annual Exhibition of Contemporary American Sculpture, Watercolors and Drawings, Whitney Museum of American Art, New York City
- 1953 International Watercolor Exhibition-Seventeenth Biennial, Brooklyn Museum, New York City
- 1958 Clemson University, Clemson, South Carolina
- 1972 Greenville County Museum of Art, Greenville, South Carolina
- 1982 State Ports Authority, Spoleto Festival, Charleston, South Carolina
- 1983 Simons Fine Arts Center, Charleston, South Carolina
- 1983-85 Painting in the South: 1954-1980, touring exhibition organized by the Virginia Museum of Art
- 1987 Changing Images, Piccolo Spoleto, Beth Elohim Synagogue, Charleston, South Carolina
- 1989 Now and Then: William Halsey and Corrie McCallum, joint exhibition, Gibbes Museum of Art, Charleston, South Carolina
- 1995 William Halsey: Recent Work 1990-1994, Halsey Institute, College of Charleston, South Carolina
- 1996 Hampton III Gallery, Taylors, South Carolina
- 1999 May 5–July 3, 1999, Greenville County Museum of Art, Greenville, South Carolina, posthumous solo exhibition William Halsey
