= Clemson House =

Coordinates: 34.680917°N 82.833987°W

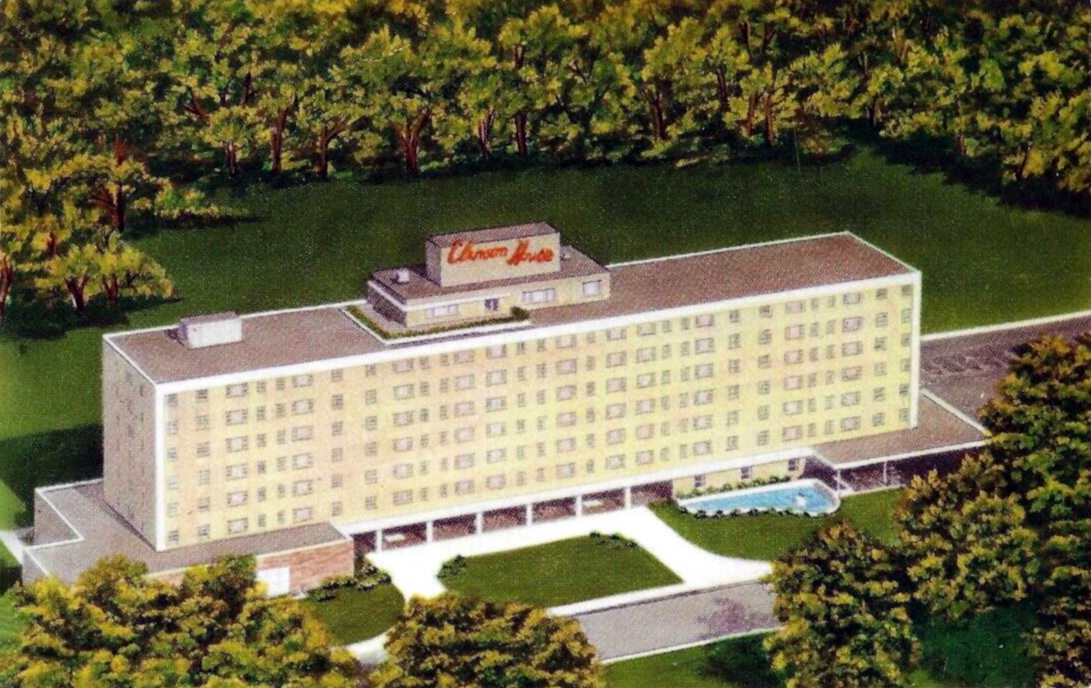
- Interactive map of the Clemson House area

General information
- Status: Demolished
- Location: Clemson, South Carolina, United States
- Completed: 1950
- Demolished: December 3, 2017
- Owner: Clemson University

Technical details
- Floor count: 7

Design and construction
- Architects: William G. Lyles; Bissett, Carlisle and Wolf Architects
- Main contractor: Daniel Construction Company
- Known for: Former hotel and residence hall on Clemson University campus

Clemson House was a hotel and later a residence hall located on the campus of Clemson University in Clemson, South Carolina, USA. It was built in 1950 and demolished by controlled implosion in 2017.

== Construction ==
Clemson House was built in 1950 by Daniel Construction Company of Greenville, owned and directed by Charles Daniel. Clemson House was designed by William G. Lyles and the firm of Bissett, Carlisle and Wolf Architects. It was opened on November 1, 1950. The hotel was constructed on a hill overlooking Clemson University's campus. The site of the former building is located across from Bowman Field and in close proximity to the Clemson University of Visitor and Alumni Center. The historic Tillman Hall and Memorial Stadium were visible from the front facing rooms of the structure. On clear days the Blue Ridge Mountains can be seen in the distance from the location.

== Building features ==
=== Exterior ===
The exterior of Clemson House featured a covered slate-paved porch, a patio, a basketball court, and a luggage drop-off behind the building. Also featured outside of Clemson House was a stainless steel tiger sculpture, freely mounted and created by Charleston Artist Willard Hirsch.

=== Internal Layout ===
Clemson House held seven floors of rooms and apartments and a three-bedroom penthouse.

In the final years before its demise, Clemson House provided housing for sophomore and higher students and visiting faculty. As a dorm facility each room housed multiple students. While serving as a hotel, the rooms of Clemson House featured oversized single beds and other furniture along with private baths, and some apartment-type units included kitchenettes.

The Clemson House also had a variety of multi-purpose rooms for meetings and conferences, rented by the university. A barber shop, laundry room, and workout room provided additional services to students, faculty, and guests of the university.

=== History ===
Before Clemson University became coeducational in 1955, Clemson College had been an all-male military school for nearly 62 years. During the time that Clemson was an all-male college, the college hosted formal dances. Women from nearby colleges and towns would serve as "chaperones" to the men at cadet dances. Before Clemson House was built in 1950, The Clemson Club Hotel stood in its place. For overnight stays there were no hotel facilities, and many women would stay in the Clemson Club Hotel. The Clemson Club Hotel was a large boarding house that provided rooms and apartments for faculty and their families. When there was room, the building made room for some of the women staying in Clemson overnight.

Former Clemson University President Franklin Poole received a report in 1948 that called for an apartment-style hotel to be built in place of the older and dilapidated hotel that sat on the hill across from Bowman Field on Clemson University's campus. The house-hotel called for meeting rooms, a large lounge, and a more modernized and upscale look. The purpose of its construction was to house faculty, staff and retired faculty members. The project hoped to attract new young faculty and their families by providing convenient on-campus living. Soon after its completion, the hotel-apartment house would house faculty and their families and employ students to work as waitresses and luggage carriers.

The Clemson House was known as "Carolina's smartest hotel.". The hotel featured a large open lounge, the restaurant named "The Saber Room", and a non alcohol-selling club, "Tiger Tavern". A 1957 advertisement for Clemson House claimed, "The Clemson House represents the absolute ultimate in modern cuisine. . . Renowned throughout the Southeast for its fine food and incomparable hospitality". Upon its initial opening, the Clemson House served as a place for students to hang out. It was deemed as "one of the better hangouts" as students would enjoy Tiger Tavern downstairs or play card games in the open lounge.

The hotel also featured a "Radio House" until the 1980s. This radio studio was built during the construction of the building and would broadcast regularly. Normal early morning broadcasts would include weather reports, local news, and programs focused on the concerns of home, farm, and domestics. In the evening, reports would be broadcast concerning agricultural commodity markets and stocks. On occasion, pre-recorded music would be played as well as some talk shows. President Sikes would often use the radio station as a medium to communicate with the student body, though since President Sikes died in 1941 his broadcasts could not have been from the Clemson House.

Several people of importance or fame have stayed at the Clemson House. Of these include a number of South Carolina governors and U.S. senators, U.S. Secretary of State Dean Rusk, and violinist Yehudi Menuhin, and opera singer Beverly Sills. Several actors in The Midnight Man (including Burt Lancaster) stayed in the penthouse suite during the film's production.

=== Demolition ===
Due to its of age, the building had fallen out of compliance with various codes and was deemed too expensive to retrofit. Workers began disassembling the interior in 2016. The neon sign was taken down July 2017. The structure was demolished by controlled implosion on December 3, 2017.

== Sources ==
- Hancock, Sierra. "Clemson alumni recount memories after Clemson House imploded Sunday." 3 December 2017
- Bryan, Wright. Clemson: An Informal History of the University, 1889-1979. Columbia, SC: R.L. Bryan, 1979. 81-83, 153-166.
- Civics and Service House. 3 November 2011
- "Clemson House." Clemson University 28 September 2011.
- "Clemson House Reservation & Usage Policy." Clemson University. 20 October 2011.
- "History" Clemson University. 28 October 2011
- Reel, Jerome V. The High Seminary. Vol. 1. Clemson, SC: Clemson University Digital, 2011.
- Riley, Helene M. Clemson University. Charleston, SC: Arcadia Pub., 2002. 82.
- TAPS 1952. Clemson, SC: Clemson A&M College. 1952.
- TAPS 1957. Clemson, SC: Clemson A&M College. 1957
