= Henrietta Johnston =

American artist (c. 1674–1729)

- Known for: Pastel
- Notable work: in museums: Metropolitan Museum of Art; Gibbes Museum of Art; Museum of Early Southern Decorative Arts; Greenville County Museum of Art
- Movement: Rococo
- Patrons: William Rhett and others

Henrietta de Beaulieu Dering Johnston (c. 1674 – March 9, 1729) was a pastelist of uncertain origin active in the English colonies in North America from approximately 1708 until her death. She is both the earliest recorded female artist and the first known pastelist working in the English colonies, and is the first portraitist known to have worked in what would become the southern United States.

== Life ==
Both the date and place of Johnston's birth are unknown; it has been suggested, and is generally accepted, that she was born in northwestern France, near the town of Rennes. Her parents, both French Huguenots, were Francis (possibly Cézar) and Suzanna de Beaulieu, and the family immigrated to London in either 1685 or 1687. (Note: Miles instead states that she was born Henrietta de Branlien in either England or Ireland; she does, however, agree with the theory that the artist was of Huguenot origin.) In 1694 Henrietta married Robert (possibly William) Dering, fifth son of Sir Edward Dering, 2nd Baronet,, and his wife Mary; she and her husband then moved to Ireland. It was during this time that Johnston began to draw pastels. Her earliest portraits depicted a number of powerful people to whom she was related by marriage; among these were John Perceval, later to become Earl of Egmont, and one of the Earls of Barrymore. Her earliest surviving pastel dates to 1704.

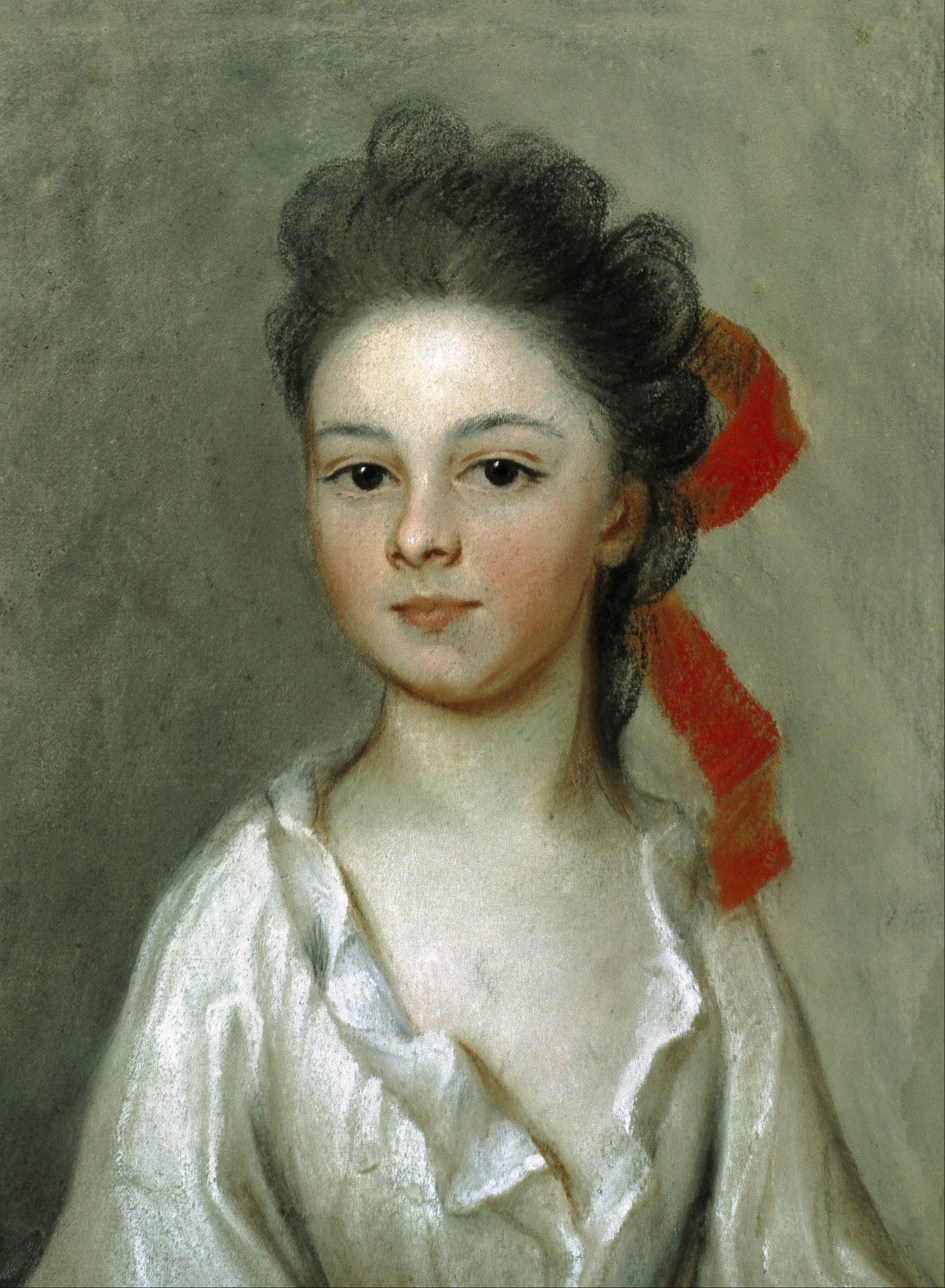
Henriette Charlotte Chastaigner (Mrs. Nathaniel Broughton), Gibbes Museum of Art

Dering's husband died in about 1704, leaving Henrietta a widow with two daughters. In 1705 she married again, this time to Anglican clergyman Gideon Johnston, a graduate of Trinity College, Dublin then serving as the vicar at Castlemore. Two years later, he was appointed by the Society for the Propagation of the Gospel in Foreign Parts to serve as commissary of the Church of England in North and South Carolina and the Bahama Islands. He was also to serve as rector of St. Philip's Episcopal Church in Charleston. The couple's time in the colonies was hard; Johnston was frequently writing the Society to request payment of his salary, which was often delayed, and their lives were further hampered by illness, lack of supplies, and distance from family. In one of his letters to his patron Gilbert Burnet, written in 1709, Johnston mentions that "were it not for the assistance my wife gives by drawing of Pictures (which can last but a little time in a place so ill peopled) I should not be able to live", indicating that Henrietta had again taken up her drawing to augment the couple's income. Another letter, dated a year later, reveals that she had run out of drawing materials and suffered "a long and tedious Sickness". Johnston made one return trip to England, in 1711–1712; her husband, too, returned there once, from 1713 to 1715. He died in a boating accident in 1716, not long after returning to Charleston.

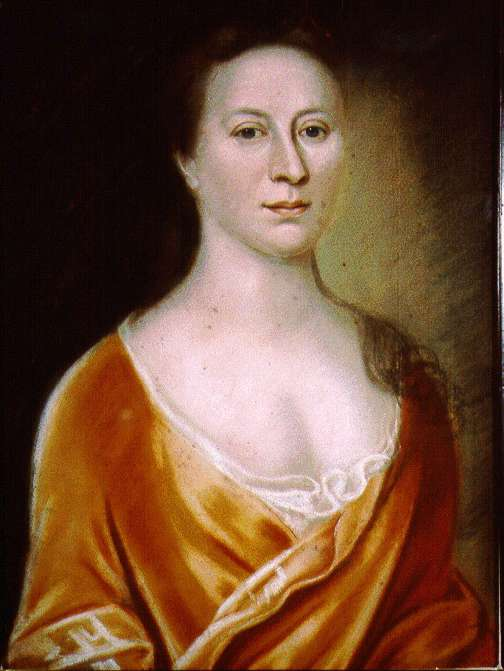
Anna Cuyler (Mrs. Anthony) Van Schaick, ca. 1725, pastel, in the New York State Museum

Little is known of Johnston's later life in the colonies. She is known to have traveled at some point to New York City, as four portraits dated 1725 exist depicting members of a family from that city. (Note: The family is that of Colonel John Moore, formerly of South Carolina; what link may have existed between them and Johnston is unknown.) She returned to Charleston at some time before her death in 1729.

Johnston and her second husband are buried together in the cemetery of St. Michael's Episcopal Church in Charleston. One of her daughters by her first marriage, Mary Dering, later became lady-in-waiting to the daughters of George II.

A suggestion has been made that Johnston was related to the painter and dancing master William Dering, who migrated to Charleston from Williamsburg, Virginia in 1749, but this is not generally accepted.

== Style ==
It is unknown whether or not Johnston studied painting and drawing; however, given the sophistication of her work, it is likely that she did indeed receive some form of training. Similarities between her pastels and the works of Irish artist Edmund Ashfield and of Edward Luttrell indicate that she may have studied with them at some point.

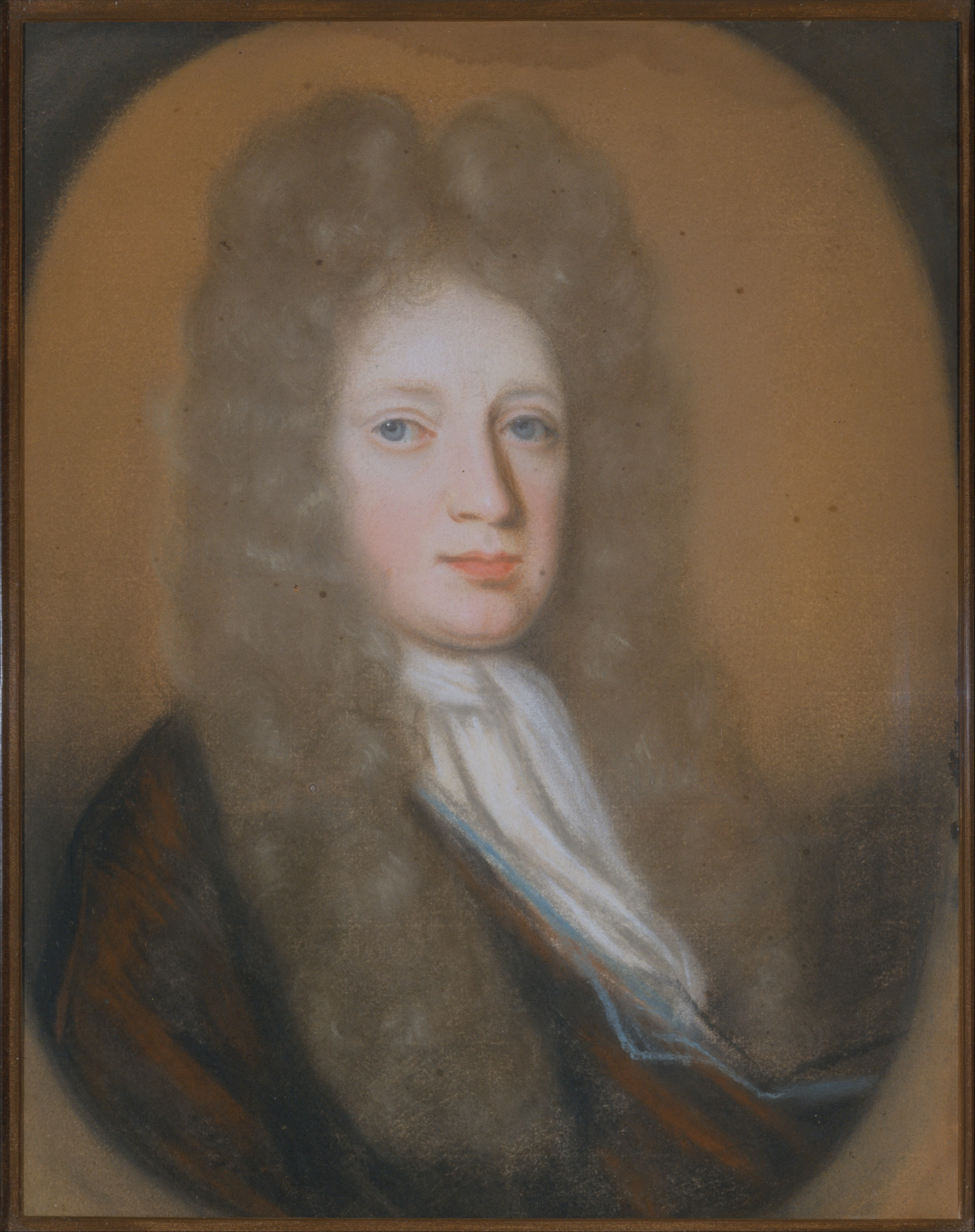
Pierre Bacot, circa 1708 –10

In pose and coloring, many of Johnston's portraits strongly resemble those of Sir Godfrey Kneller, which at the time were greatly in fashion in the United Kingdom and the colonies. Her pastels from Ireland are drawn in deep earth tones, while those from her time in South Carolina are generally lighter and smaller, due likely to the precious nature of her materials, which had to be imported. The Irish works, which show the most attention to detail of all her works, depict sitters at three-quarter length, as do the earliest of her Carolina pastels. Johnston's American female subjects are usually shown wearing chemises, while the male subjects are drawn mostly in street clothes; some of the latter are depicted wearing armor. Each subject is shown sitting erect, with the head frequently turned at a slight angle from the body and towards the viewer. The faces are typically dominated by large oval eyes. Works dating to after her second husband's death are less finished; details of clothing are less well-defined and colors are less saturated, suggesting either that the artist was running out of materials or that she was working at greater speed to complete commissions.

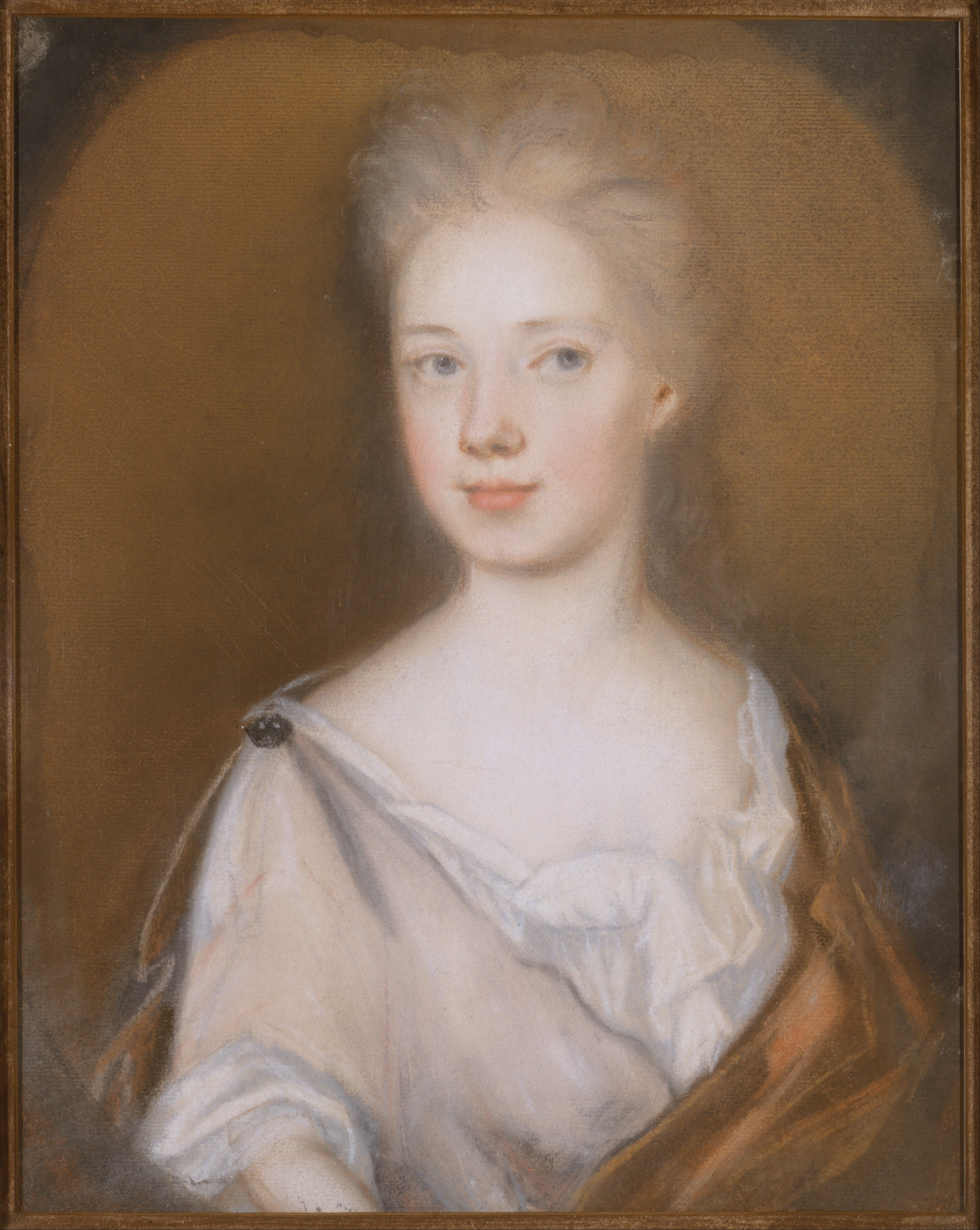
Mrs. Pierre Bacot (Marianne Fleur Du Gue), circa 1708 –10

Johnston usually signed her portraits on their wooden backing, noting her name, the location of completion, and the date of completion in order. A typical signature is the inscription on the reverse of her portrait of Philip Perceval: Henrietta Dering Fecit / Dublin Anno 1704. Johnston was almost exclusively a portraitist; the only landscapes attributed to her hand are the backgrounds of a pair of children's portraits from New York, which are also her only known portraits of children.

About forty portraits by Johnston are known to survive; many have preserved their original frames and backboards, on which her signature may be found. These mostly depict members of her social circle and, later, of her husband's Charleston congregation, such as Colonel William Rhett. Many of her South Carolina portraits depict members of Huguenot families that had settled in the New World, including the Prioleaus, Bacots (including Pierre Bacot and his first wife Marianne Fleur Du Gue) and duBoses (including Judith DuBose). Today, a number of her works are held by the Gibbes Museum of Art in Charleston, which has developed an interactive online exhibition dedicated to her work; other pieces may be seen in the Museum of Early Southern Decorative Arts, the Metropolitan Museum of Art, and the Greenville County Museum of Art. Johnston is not known to have worked in oils, but one of her portraits was copied at some point by Jeremiah Theus.

Nine portraits, each depicting members of the Southwell and Perceval families, were owned by American preservationist Jim Williams and displayed at his Mercer House in Savannah, Georgia. Seven are inscribed "Dublin, Ireland" and are dated from 1704 to 1705. They were put up for sale by Sotheby's in 2000, seven with their original frames. Williams protected them from the light in an upstairs dressing room where the shutters were kept closed.
