= Laura Bragg =

American museum director

Laura Mary Bragg
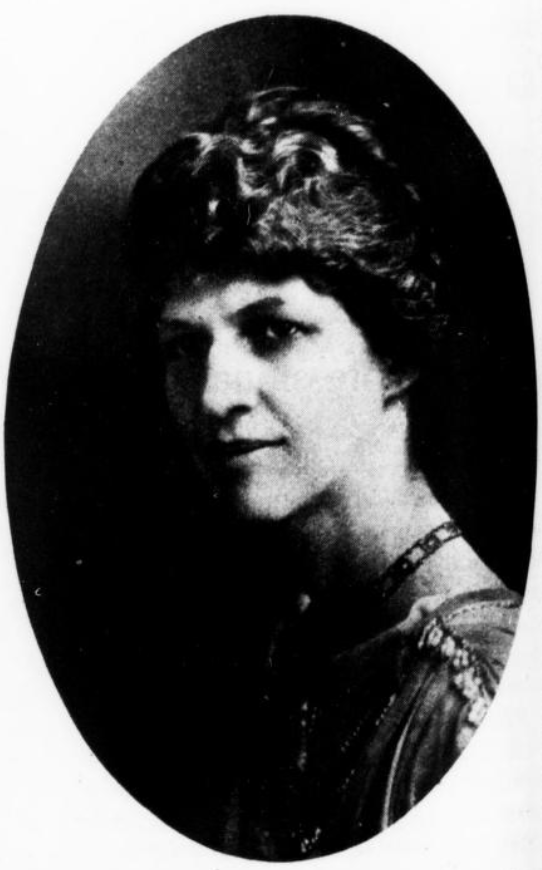
- Bragg, from a 1923 publication
- Born: October 9, 1881; Massachusetts, U.S.
- Died: May 16, 1978 (aged 96); Charleton, South Carolina, U.S.
- Occupations: Curator, botanical collector
- Partner: Helen Gardner McCormack

Laura Mary Bragg (October 9, 1881 – May 16, 1978) was an American museum director who became the first woman to run a publicly funded art museum in America when she was named the director of the Charleston Museum in 1920. She later directed the Berkshire Museum in Massachusetts and advised on the reorganization of the Valentine Museum in Virginia. She is also known for developing a widely copied form of traveling museum exhibition for schools called a "Bragg Box."

== Early life and education ==
Laura Mary Bragg was born in Massachusetts on October 9, 1881, one of three children of Rev. Lyman Bragg and Sarah Jane (Klotz) Bragg. She spent a few of her earliest years in Mississippi, where her father was a professor at Rust University, a college for formerly enslaved people.

At the age of six, Bragg contracted scarlet fever, which left her with progressive hearing loss. Her father consulted on treatment for her at Alexander Graham Bell's Boston school for the deaf. Bragg coped with her partial but incurable hearing loss by learning to lip read and developing an exceptional memory.

Up to high school, Bragg was educated at home. She went to high school in New Hampshire and Massachusetts before going on to Simmons College for a degree in library science. She graduated with the college's very first class, in 1906. She also studied biology, doing a museum practicum at the Boston Society of Natural History.

After college, she worked as a librarian for one year on Orr's Island, Maine, where she introduced a children's nature program. Bragg then worked at the 115th Street Branch of the New York Public Library.

== Museum work ==
=== Charleston Museum ===
Bragg was recommended to apply for the position of librarian at the Charleston Museum in 1909. She was then promoted to curator of books and public instruction. She developed the museum's first educational programs and designed installations in the museum's new building. Bragg was named director of the Charleston Museum in 1920 after Paul Rea's retirement, becoming the first woman in America to run a publicly funded art museum. She connected the Charleston Museum with the wider American museum field by regularly attending meetings of the American Alliance of Museums (AAM), hosting the AAM meeting in Charleston in 1923 and becoming a board member in 1924. Bragg directed the museum's purchase of the historic Heyward-Washington House in 1929.

In 1921, she opened the museum to Black visitors on Saturday afternoons, less than four years after the museum's own trustees had put in place a policy denying admission to Black people.

Bragg's directorship brought her into close contact with the Charleston artists and writers who would later be known as forming the Charleston Renaissance, especially Ned Jennings, Alice Ravenel Huger Smith, DuBose Heyward, John Bennett, and Josephine Pinckney.

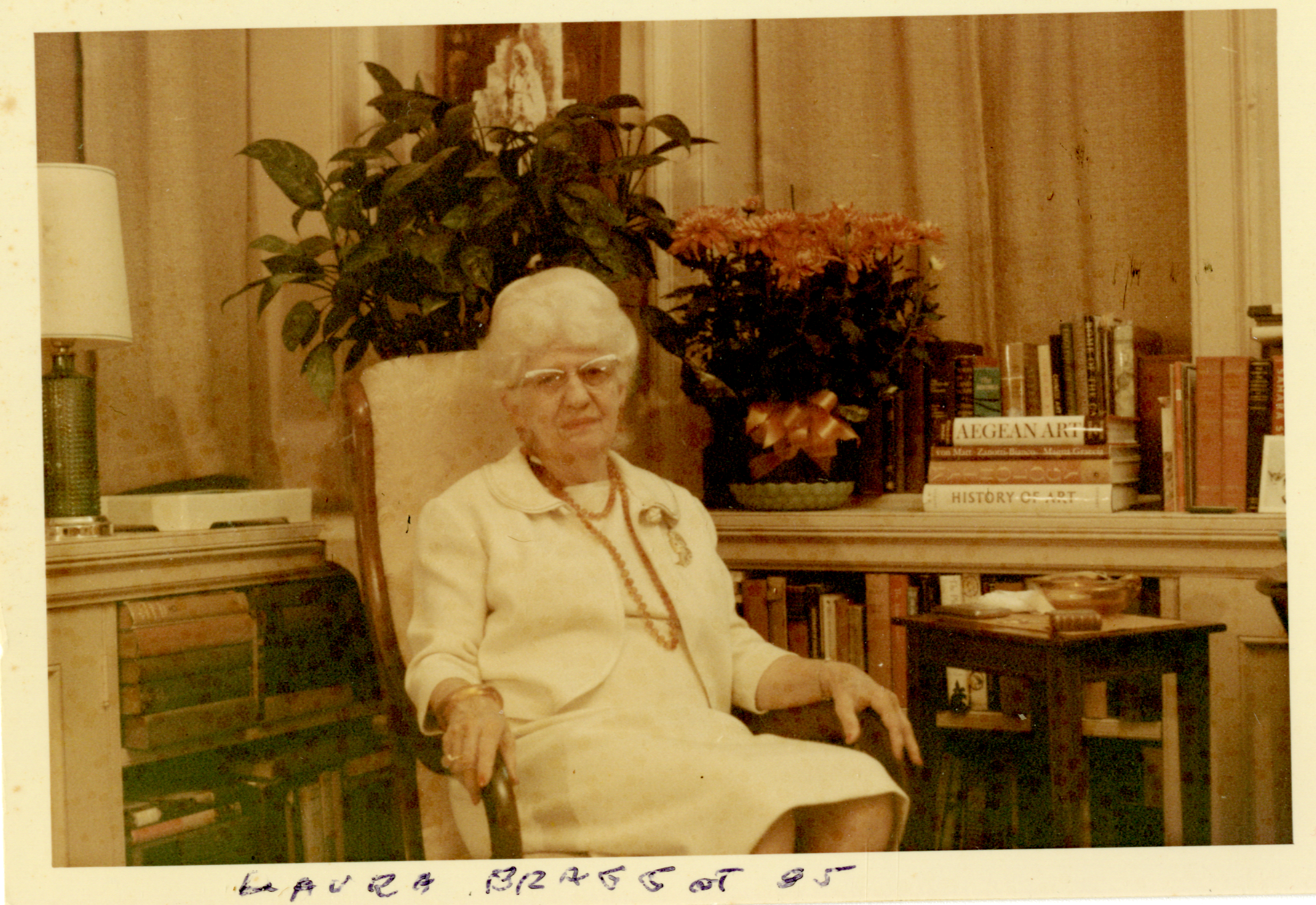
Photo of Laura Bragg at age 85

==== Bragg Boxes ====
Bragg was devoted to the ideal of public education, and one of her most successful initiatives in Charleston was what became known as "Bragg Boxes" or "Bragg's Boxes," which were founded on the idea of bringing the museum to people who were unable to visit. Beginning in around 1913, the Bragg Boxes were circulating exhibits that were sent out to students first in the city of Charleston and eventually expanding to Charleston County and the wider state of South Carolina. The boxes were available to both white and Black schools, although many Black schools could not afford their use until 1927 when they received a monetary donation. Wooden boxes with hinged panels, they opened into "miniature stage sets" or dioramas on either local natural history (green-painted boxes) or cultural history (red-painted boxes). They were accompanied by teaching materials—often developed by Bragg herself—and objects that could be handled by the students. She created over five dozen of these boxes altogether.

Other museums—including the American Museum of Natural History in New York—picked up on this idea and incorporated Bragg Boxes in their own educational outreach programs. It was actually during her subsequent tenure at the Berkshire Museum in Massachusetts that these traveling exhibits gained their name of Bragg Boxes.

=== Valentine Museum ===
In 1924, while still running the Charleston Museum, Bragg was asked to consult on a reorganization of the Valentine Museum in Richmond, Virginia. Four years later, in 1928, the Valentine Museum finally authorized Bragg to start on the proposed reorganization, a process that took two more years to complete.

=== Berkshire Museum ===
Bragg's work in shaping the Charleston Museum earned her a national reputation, and in 1930, industrialist Zenas Marshall Crane induced her to move to Pittsfield, Massachusetts, to become director of the Berkshire Museum, which was then little more than a family collection. She was given a free hand to turn the museum into a fully developed educational institution. Diversifying the museum's exhibitions, she doubled attendance in her first year. She also oversaw the transformation of the museum's central courtyard into a sculpture gallery and theater, allowing the museum to host performing arts for the first time.

Bragg's eye for art and visionary thinking is evident from several different aspects of her work at the Berkshire Museum. She inaugurated several ground-breaking and controversial exhibitions of modern art at the museum, and she was the first American museum director to buy and exhibit Alexander Calder's sculptures. In 1932, she organized an important exhibition of Shaker furniture, which was then little known.

== Other work ==
Bragg served as the first librarian for the Charleston Free Library, now the Charleston County Public Library, in 1931. Under her leadership, the library opened January 1, 1931 in the Charleston Museum. Bragg was also one of the founding trustees, but left almost immediately to work at the Berkshire Museum. Her sudden departure left the library in a difficult situation

Bragg was also a cofounder of the Poetry Society of South Carolina in 1920 along with DuBose Heyward, Josephine Pinckney, Hervey Allen and John Bennett. The Society held readings, lectures, and smaller poetry critiques, giving out awards for poetry as well. Bragg had a Society poetry prize named for herself, which awarded the ‘‘best poem of local color possessing a universal appeal." She also helped found the Southern States Art League and the Southern Museum Conference.

Bragg had a lifelong interest in biology. She published "Preliminary List of the Ferns of the Coast Region of South Carolina North of Charleston," an article on the ferns of coastal South Carolina, in the American Fern Journal in 1914 and conducted fieldwork on South Carolina plants as part of her work at the Charleston Museum. Bragg adapted natural sciences curriculum, changing references to local plants to allow students a richer educational experience.

Bragg taught a post-graduate museum studies course at Columbia Teacher's College in New York City during their summer session in the 1920s.

Bragg is listed as the 'nature study' teacher at the Confederate College in Charleston, South Carolina for the 1913-1914 school year.

== Personal life ==
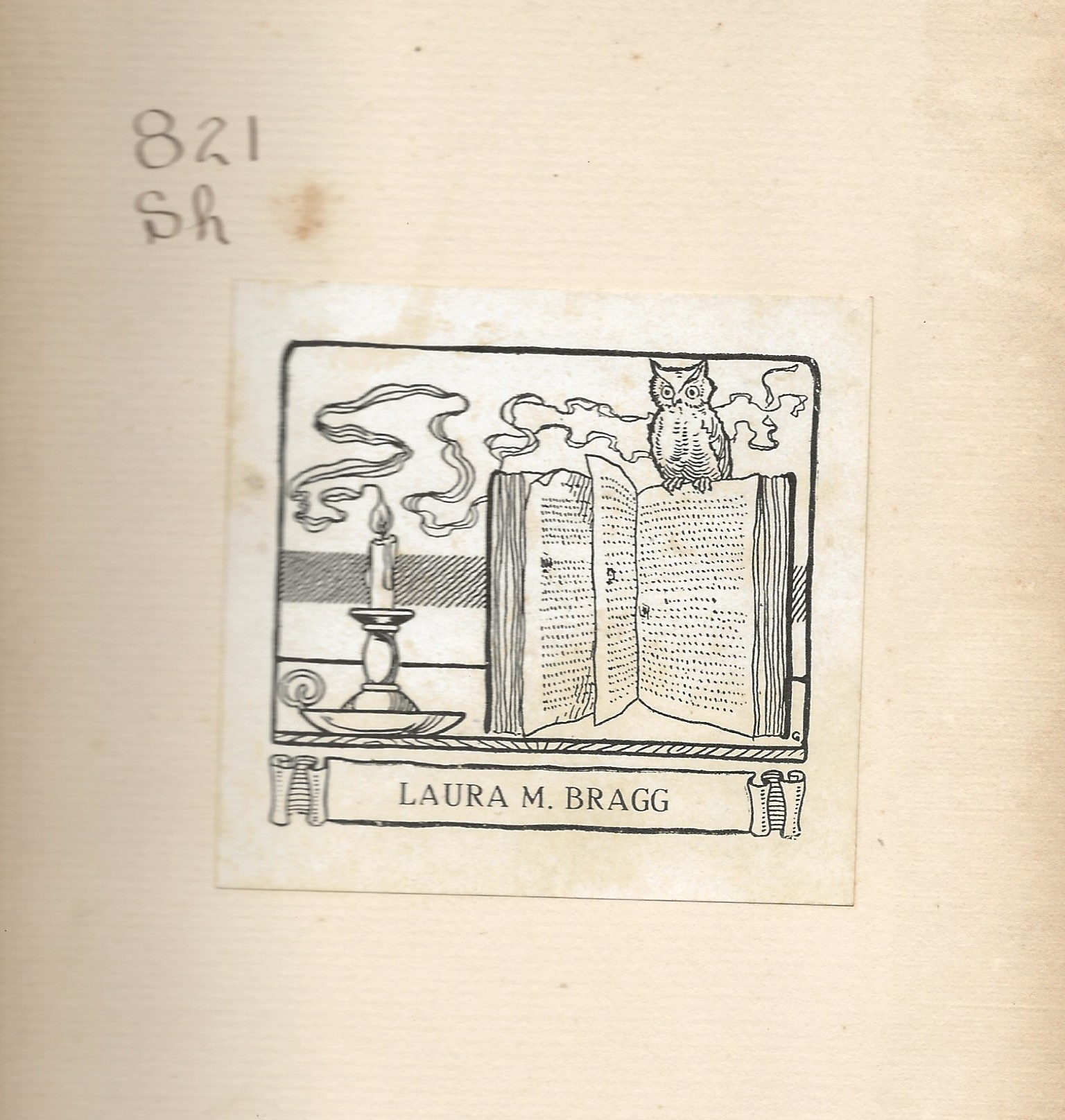
Laura Bragg's bookplate

Bragg never married. She had many romantic friendships with women and several Boston marriages, notably with Hester Gaillard, Belle Heyward, and Helen Gardner McCormack, who became a protégé of Bragg's at the Charleston Museum.

In 1915 Bragg moved in with Isabelle Heyward (known as Belle). For Bragg's first birthday at the house, Heyward gifted her with a set of bookplates. Bragg said of the gift, "I insist the owl looks like Belle sagely advising me to go to sleep...She does everything to make me happy that she can." The two lived together until Heyward's death from asphyxiation on October 20, 1926 at the age of 56. Bragg moved out of their shared home and purchased her own house in Charleston.

Prior to Heyward's death, Helen Gardner McCormack had been Bragg's assistant at the Charleston Museum. After Heyward's death, they became close companions. In 1927 McCormack wrote to Bragg of time they spent together at Bragg's house in Snug Harbor, "I’m very, very glad you took me to see the Moon. She was so perfect and so beautiful, and we saw her in so many ways along the shore. Dearest I see so much beauty because of you."

She regularly visited her family in New Hampshire to escape hot Charleston summers, using the trips to visit different museums for inspiration. Heyward accompanied her on one of these trips in 1916.

Bragg worked with Chinese students studying at The Citadel. She corresponded with students and helped sponsor events to bring together the students and the Charleston community, founding a club for that purpose called the Ta T'ung (大同) Club. Virginia Military Institute cadet Li Rendao who often visited friends at The Citadel referred to Bragg as their "international mother." Bragg kept a scrapbook with newspaper clippings about the students, photographs of the club members at her home in Snug Harbor, graduation photographs, and commencement programs. She continued to correspond with students after graduation, keeping in contact until the founding of the People's Republic of China in 1949.

== Later years ==
Bragg retired from the Berkshire Museum in 1939 and returned to Charleston, where she continued working as an educator. She died there on May 16, 1978.

The main archive of her papers is held by the South Carolina Historical Society. Another archive, consisting chiefly of letters written to Bragg by Chinese military cadets whom she befriended, is held by The Citadel Archives & Museum in Charleston.

== Quote ==
"The principle of museum work is progressive installation. A finished museum is a dead museum."
