= Confederate Home =

Retirement home in South Carolina, US

Coordinates: 32.776776°N 79.929846°W

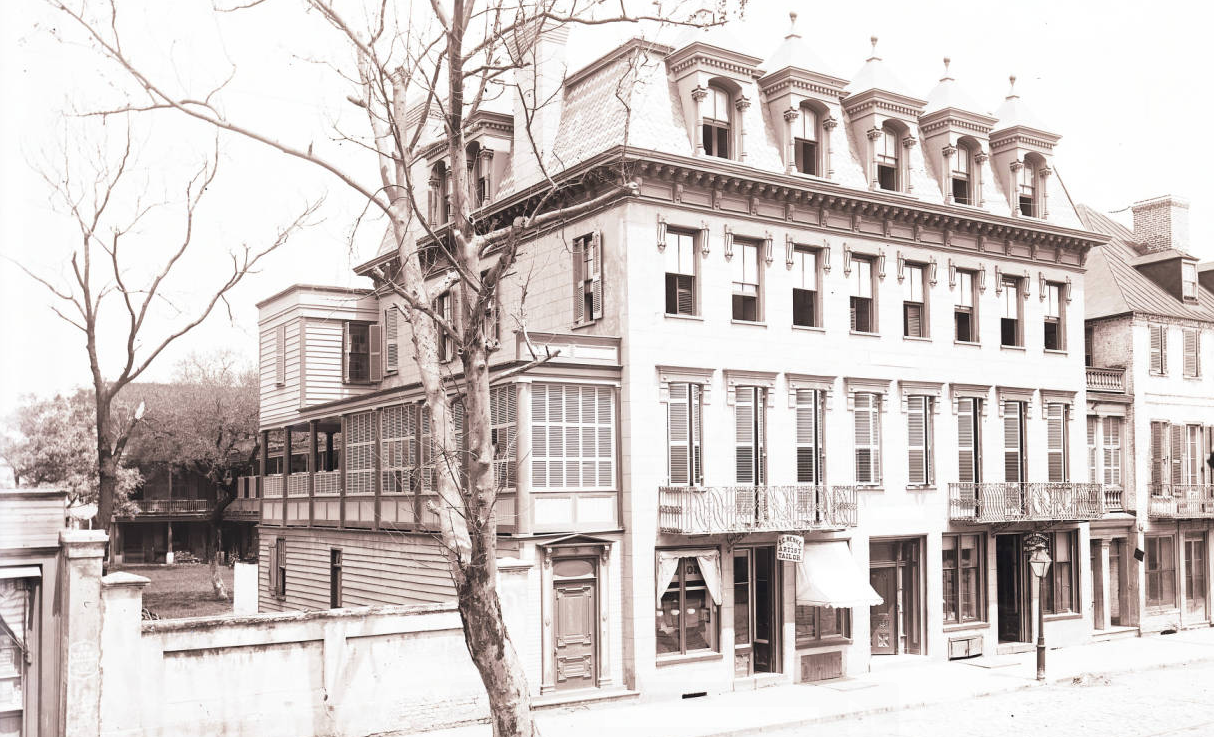
George LaGrange Cook photographed the Confederate Home in about 1890.

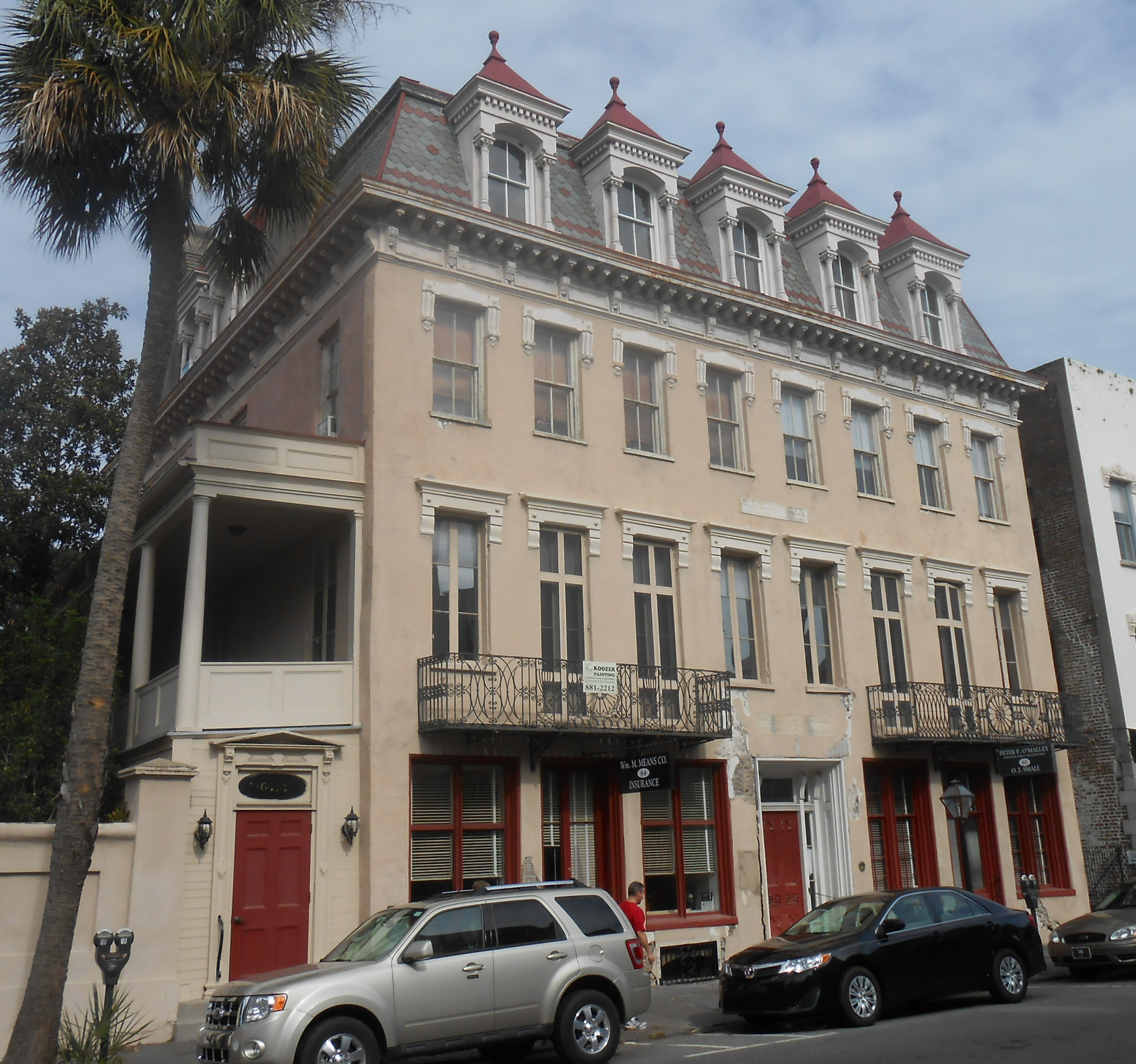
The Confederate Home, 60 Broad St., Charleston, South Carolina

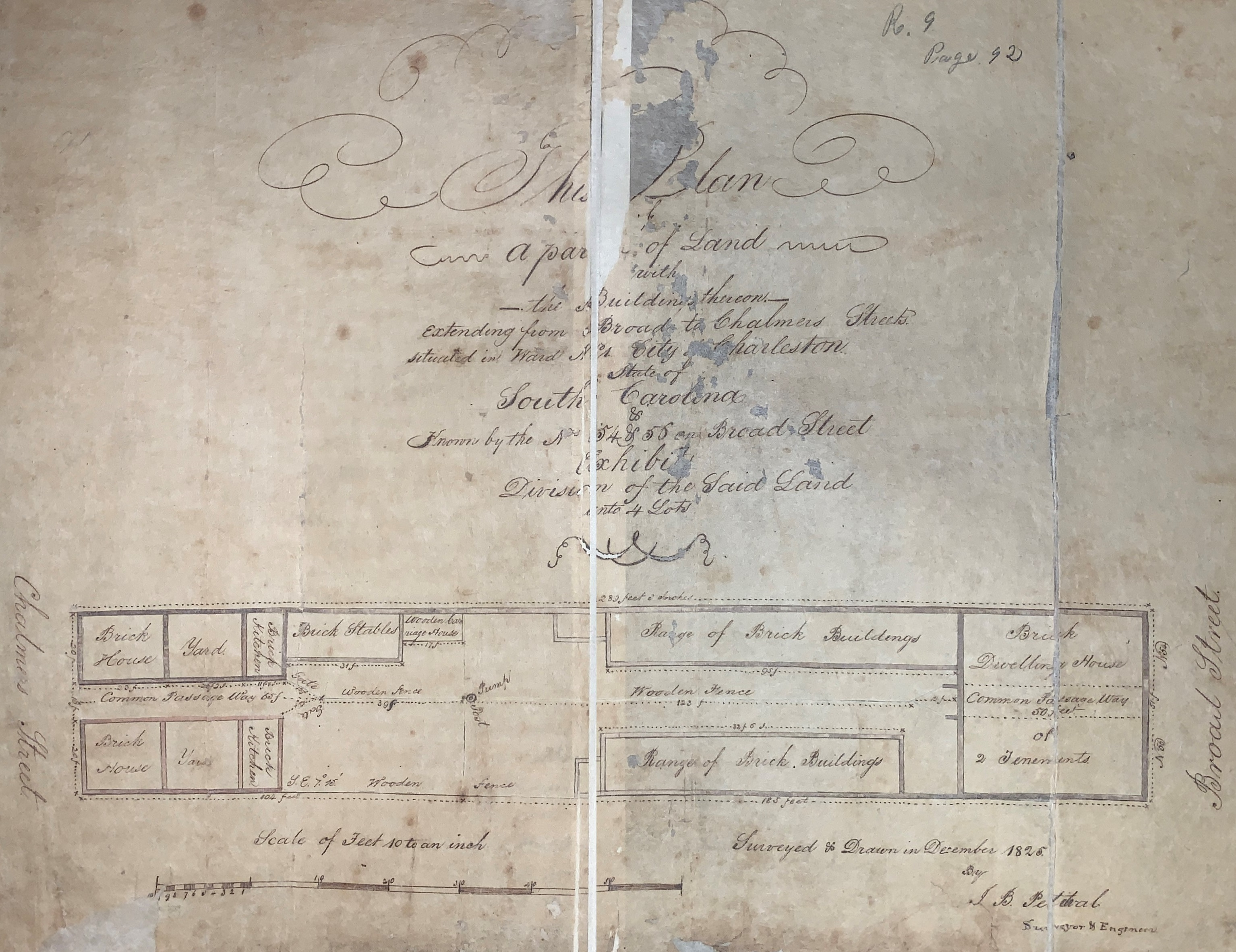
A plat showing the Confederate House in 1825 before the street was renumbered.

The Confederate Home is a retirement home located in an early 19th-century building at 60 Broad Street in Charleston, South Carolina. The building started as a double tenement in about 1800, built for master builder Gilbert Chalmers. From 1834 to 1867, it was operated as the Carolina Hotel by Angus Stewart. In 1867, sisters Mary Amarinthia Snowden and Isabell S. Snowden established the Home for the Mothers, Widows, and Daughters of Confederate Soldiers (the Confederate Home) and operated their housing program at the house.

The Confederate Home bought the property outright in May 1874. Two stores operated on the Broad Street frontage. Educational and residential facilities were located behind.

When the building was damaged by the 1886 Charleston earthquake, it was restored with Victorian details, including a mansard roof and dormers.
