= Gibbes Museum of Art =

Art museum in Charleston, South Carolina

The Gibbes Museum of Art
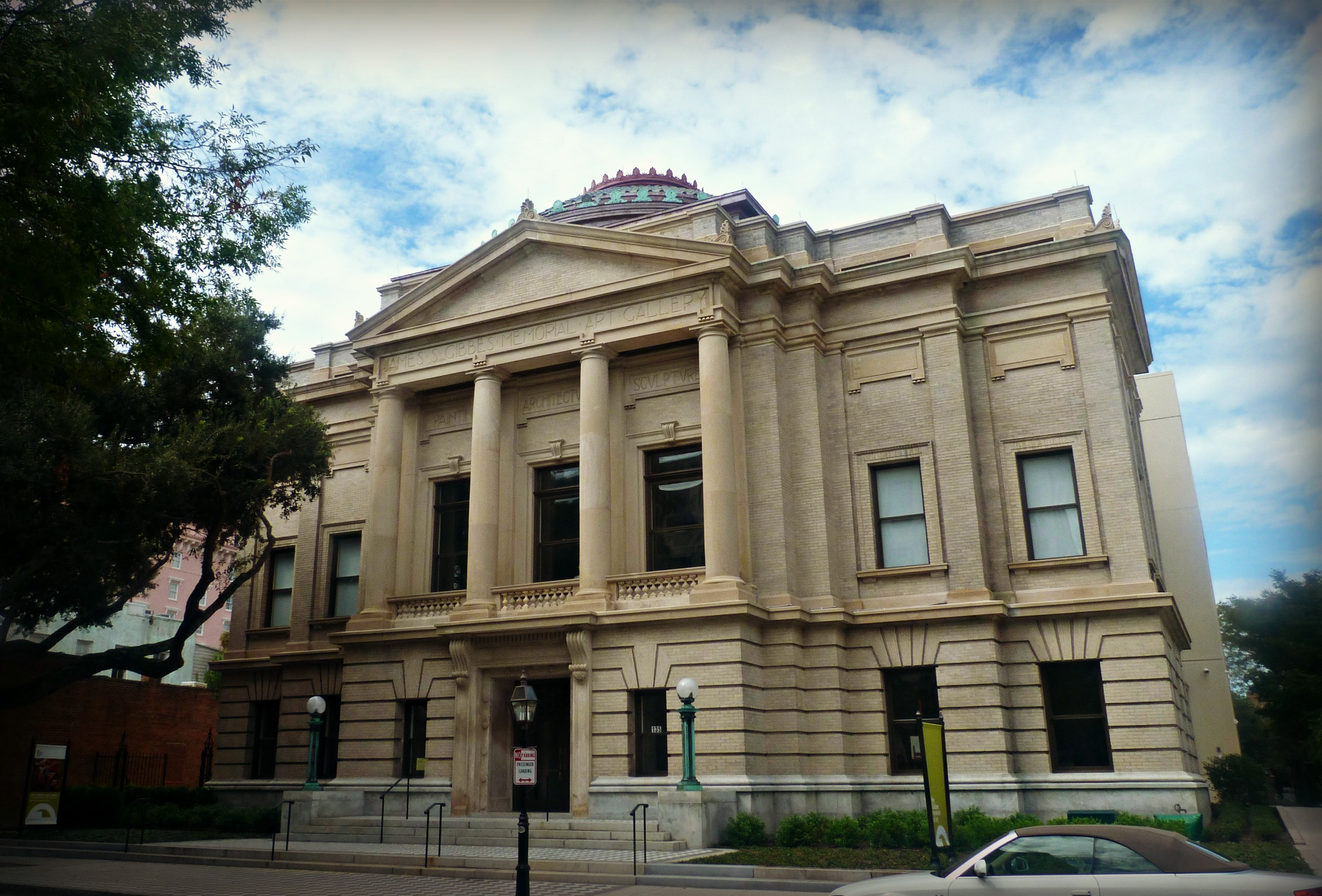
- The Gibbes Museum of Art
- Interactive fullscreen map
- Established: 1905
- Location: 135 Meeting Street; Charleston, South Carolina
- Coordinates: 32°46′43″N 79°55′54″W
- Type: Art museum
- Curator: Sara Arnold
- Website: gibbesmuseum.org

The Gibbes Museum of Art, formerly known as the Gibbes Art Gallery, is an art museum in Charleston, South Carolina. Established as the Carolina Art Association in 1858, the museum moved into a new Beaux Arts building at 135 Meeting Street, in the Charleston Historic District, in 1905. The Gibbes houses a premier collection of over 10,000 works of fine art, principally American works, many with a connection to Charleston or the South.

The benefactor, James Shoolbred Gibbes, donated $100,000 to the Carolina Arts Association for the "erection of a suitable building for the exhibitions of paintings." The city did not receive the money until after the resolution of a will contest filed by nieces and nephews of Gibbes. Their case was heard in the state court of New York during 1900 and 1901. On December 6, 1901, the New York Supreme Court (the state's trial-level court) issued an opinion declaring that the gift to Charleston was valid.

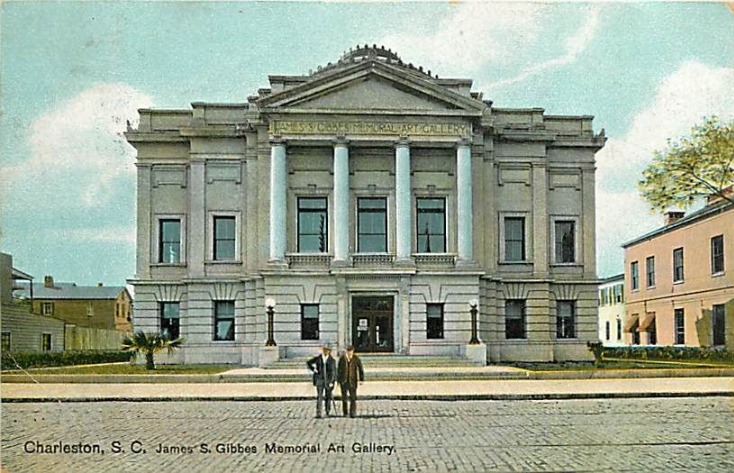
The Gibbes Museum of Art has remained nearly unchanged; this postcard is dated 1907.

After receiving the money in 1903, the Association hired Frank Pierce Milburn to design the gallery. He planned a Tiffany-style dome, Doric columns, and pediment-capped windows and doors. Milburn completed the drawings of the building in mid-1903, and a drawing of the proposed building was published in the Charleston Evening Post on June 5, 1903. Notices were published seeking contractors' bids for the work starting in August 1903.

In September 1903, H.T. Zacharias was selected as the contractor and received a contract for $73,370 for the building. Zacharias started work on September 28, 1903, removing the remains of the South Carolina Agricultural Hall that had occupied the lot. Although work on the foundations had begun already, a ceremony was held on December 8, 1903, to lay the cornerstone of the building at the northeast corner.

The museum formally opened on April 11, 1905. The collection on display on the opening day included more than 300 pictures, many bronzes, and about 200 miniatures in addition to an "instructive collection" of Japanese prints.

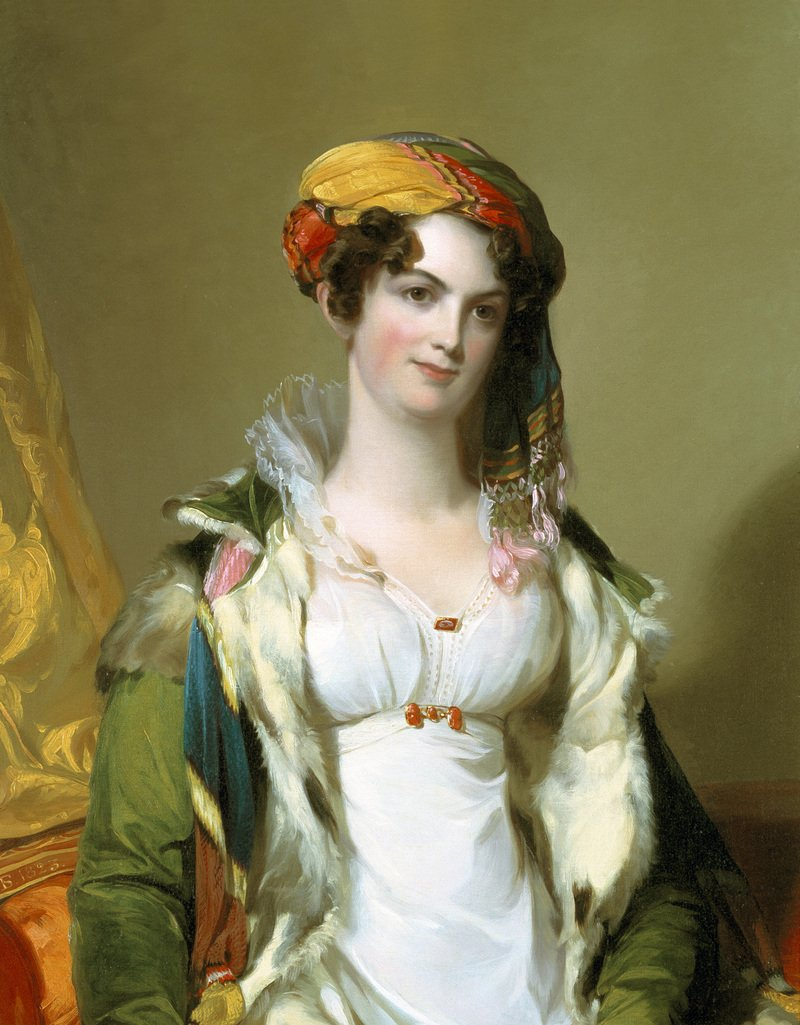
The portrait by Thomas Sully of Sarah Reeve Ladson, daughter of James Ladson, is owned by the museum. Ladson "visually made reference to the taste of the slave women around whom she had been raised."

After closing in the early 21st century for an extensive two-year, $13.5 million renovation, the museum reopened to the public on May 28, 2016. In renovating the museum, the development teams used the original blueprints, discovered in the City of Charleston archives in 2008, to return the building to its 1905 Beaux Arts style layout. The first floor has classrooms, artist studios, lecture and event spaces, and a museum store. The rear reception area opens to the garden, part of Charleston's historic Gateway Walk founded by the Garden Club of Charleston. The entire ground floor of the museum is admission-free.

The museum's collections include the work of numerous artists with connections to Charleston, including Charles Fraser, William Melton Halsey, Ned I.R. Jennings, Henrietta Johnston, Mary Roberts, Merton Simpson, and Jeremiah Theus. The museum also has collected photographs by George LaGrange Cook, including photographs taken after the 1886 Charleston earthquake.
