= Southern States Art League =

The Southern States Art League, originally called the All-Southern Art Association, was formed in the 1920s to draw attention to artists from the southern United States. A number of its early members were closely associated with the Charleston Renaissance, and it has been credited with helping to establish the South as "a viable art center and formidable force in the realm of American culture."

== History ==
The All-Southern Art Association was originally conceived in 1920 as a committee with members drawn from the Carolina Art Association and chaired by Camilla Scott Pinckney, the mother of novelist and poet Josephine Pinckney. Its goal was to present an exhibition of only southern artists, and the inaugural All-Southern Art Exhibit was held at the Gibbes Gallery of Art in Charleston, South Carolina, in 1921. Juried by museum director Florence McIntyre and artists L. Birge Harrison, William Posey Silva, and Alfred Hutty, it was successful in attracting both large numbers of visitors and favorable national press.

Following the first show, the association put on shows at venues that rotated through a roster of leading southern cities, including New Orleans (Louisiana), Columbia (South Carolina), Atlanta and Mobile (Georgia). The association also sponsored lecture tours by southern artists and in 1921-22 organized an exhibition by leading Charleston Renaissance artist Alice Ravenel Huger Smith. Other southern art leagues such as the Palm Beach Art League in Florida became affiliated with the All-Southern Art Association.

In 1922, the All-Southern Art Association renamed itself the Southern States Art League.

== Notable members ==
- Catharine Carter Critcher
- Margaret Nowell Graham
- Ella Sophonisba Hergesheimer
- William R. Hollingsworth, Jr.
- Bonnie MacLeary
- Florence McClung
- Augusta Oelschig
- Dixie Selden
- Alice Ravenel Huger Smith
- Waldine Tauch
- Helen Maria Turner
- Elizabeth O'Neill Verner
- Ellsworth Woodward
