= Ann Taylor =

Ann or Anne Taylor may refer to:

- Ann Taylor (writer, born 1757) (1757–1830), English writer
- Ann Taylor (poet) (1782–1866), English poet and children's writer, daughter of the above
- Anne Taylor Nash (née Taylor, 1884–1968), American painter
- Ann Taylor (actress) (born 1936), British actress, hostess and singer
- Ann Taylor (newscaster) (born c. 1945), American radio personality
- Ann Taylor, Baroness Taylor of Bolton (born 1947), British Labour Party politician
- Ann Bonfoey Taylor (1910–2007), American aviator, flight instructor and fashion designer
- Anne Taylor (netball administrator) (born 1936), New Zealand netball administrator
- Anne Taylor (netball player) (born 1953), New Zealand netball player
- Ann Inc., American clothing retailer that uses the brand "Ann Taylor"

== See also ==
- Ann Taylor Allen, American historian
- Annie Taylor (disambiguation)
- Anna Taylor (disambiguation)
