= Ellen Day Hale =

American painter (1855–1940)

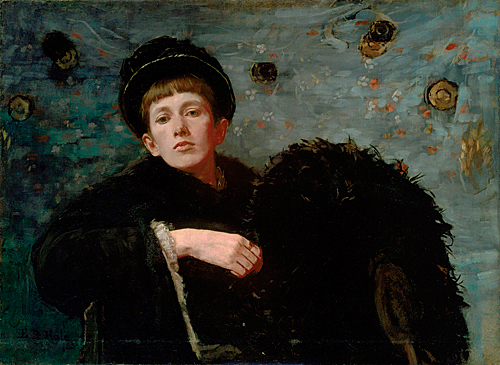
- Self-Portrait, oil on canvas, 1885, (28 1/2" x 39") Museum of Fine Arts, Boston
- Born: February 11, 1855; Worcester, Massachusetts
- Died: February 11, 1940 (aged 85); Brookline, Massachusetts
- Education: Académie Julian
- Known for: Painting, printmaking

Ellen Day Hale (February 11, 1855 – February 11, 1940) was an American Impressionist painter and printmaker from Boston. She studied art in Paris and during her adult life lived in Paris, London and Boston. She exhibited at the Paris Salon and the Royal Academy of Arts. Hale wrote the book History of Art: A Study of the Lives of Leonardo, Michelangelo, Raphael, Titian, and Albrecht Dürer and mentored the next generation of New England female artists, paving the way for widespread acceptance of female artists.

== Biography ==
=== Early life ===
Ellen Day Hale was born on February 11, 1855, in Worcester, Massachusetts, into an elite Boston Brahmin family. Hale's father was author and orator Edward Everett Hale, and her mother was Emily Baldwin Perkins. Although the Hale family was well respected among the Boston upper class, they were not exceptionally wealthy. Her father acted as a Unitarian chaplain in the U.S. Senate from 1904 until his death in 1909, and Hale often assisted her father in his church-related duties. Hale was one of eight children, and she helped her mother and father take care of her younger siblings. From a young age, Hale was raised within an artistic atmosphere, as her mother encouraged her interest in art, and her aunt, watercolorist Susan Hale, most likely provided her first artistic instruction. Her brother was Philip Leslie Hale, a celebrated artist and art critic, and he married Lilian Westcott Hale, an Impressionist painter.

Hale's family background provided her with a network of strong female role models. Her great-aunt was Harriet Beecher Stowe, abolitionist and author of the anti-slavery novel Uncle Tom's Cabin. Educator Catharine Beecher and suffragist Isabella Beecher Hooker were also great-aunts. One of Hale's first cousins was writer and social reformer Charlotte Perkins Gilman, best known for her short story "The Yellow Wallpaper".

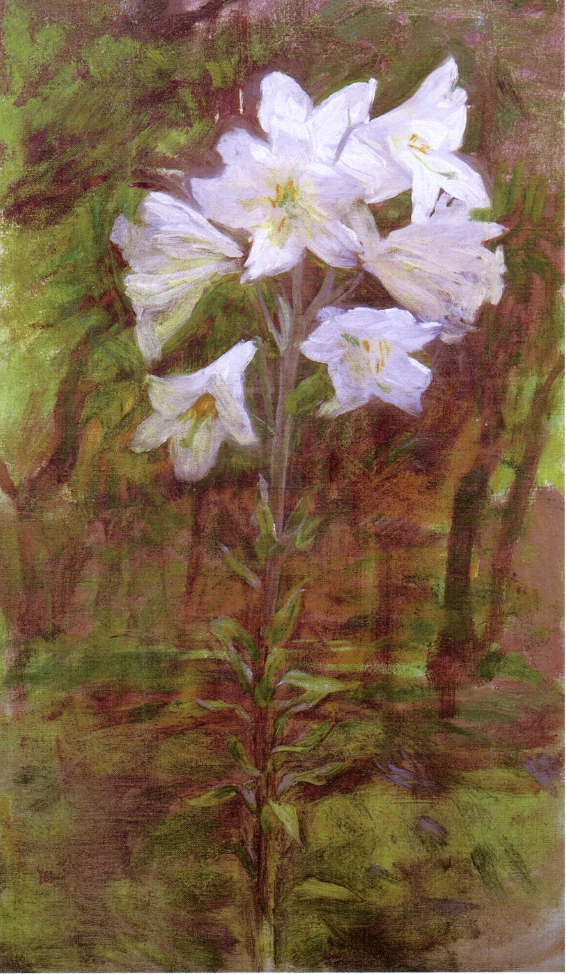
Lilies, circa 1890s, oil on canvas (26" x 15")

=== Education ===
In 1873, Hale began her formal art education and training in Boston with painter William Rimmer. Although the changing cultural and social landscape of Boston provided many new opportunities for women, female students were still segregated from their male counterparts. Therefore, Hale took private lessons from Rimmer, and his instruction focused primarily on drawing and the analysis of anatomy. A year later, Hale enrolled in William Morris Hunt's school for painting with approximately forty other women artists. With Hunt, artist Helen M. Knowlton acted as one of the school's main instructors. Hunt and Knowlton encouraged a new style and used unique teaching methods, such as interpretive sketching, which had an important artistic influence on Hale. Knowlton especially promoted a sense of community within the class of female artists, and the group of women relied upon each other, rather than their husbands or other men, for professional and personal support.

Seeking additional training, Hale traveled to Philadelphia in 1878 to attend the Pennsylvania Academy of the Fine Arts (PAFA). Hale studied at PAFA for two years, where she first painted from the live female nude. Hale attended the Academy while it was directed by Thomas Eakins, who, like William Rimmer, emphasized the study of human anatomy as the basis for figure painting. After studying in Philadelphia, Hale traveled throughout Europe with Knowlton in 1881. The pair visited Belgium, Holland, Italy, England and France, visiting museums and copying paintings, before Hale moved to Paris to begin training with Parisian masters. Hale was one of over one thousand young American artists studying in and around Paris at this time. She quickly enrolled in formal programs, first studying drawing with Emmanuel Frémiet at the Jardin des Plantes, and then going on to train at Académie Colarossi. Hunt and Knowlton's "rather loosely structured school had not prepared Hale for the rigorous teaching style of the Académie Colarossi, where she found the 'general work of the class...neither interesting nor inspiring."

In September 1882, Hale traveled to London to study briefly at the Royal Academy of Arts. On returning to Paris, she began training at the Académie Julian, where she studied for three years. Her instructors included Rudolphe Julian, Tony Robert-Fleury, Jules Joseph Lefebvre, Gustave-Rudolphe Boulanger and William-Adolphe Bouguereau. Because young women were not admitted to the most prestigious Parisian institutes like the Ecole des Beaux-Arts, they were left with no choice but to enroll in independent academies that charged tuition. Académie Julian followed the practice of most private schools and required women to pay more money than men for lessons. Despite these hardships, Hale preferred Académie Julian to any of the other schools she attended, as she developed a close-knit group of friends who acted as a support system for her.

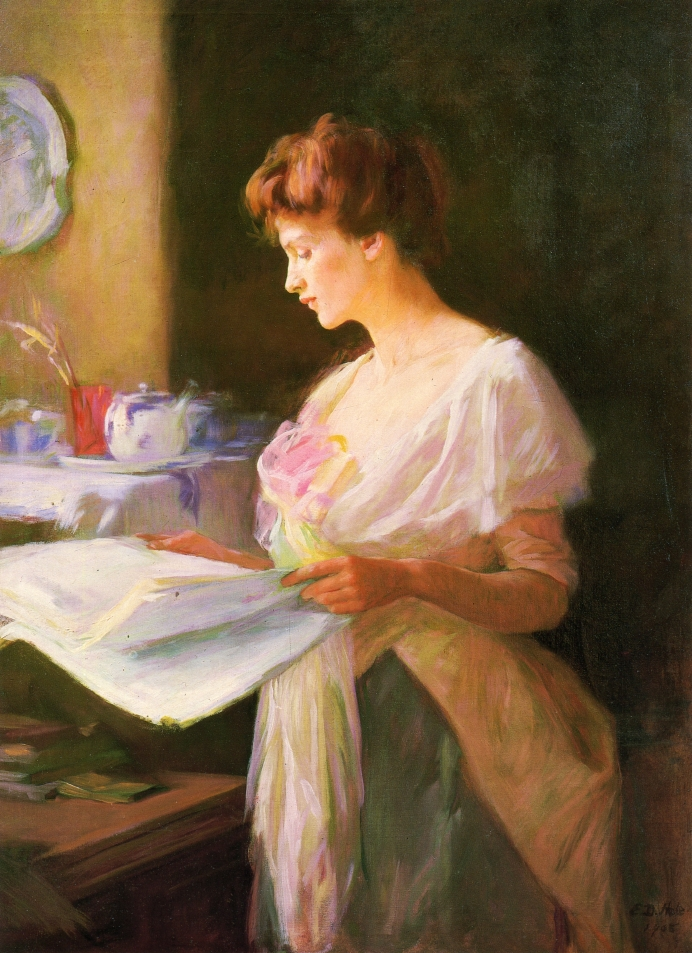
Morning News, 1905, oil on canvas (50" x 36")

=== Personal life ===
Hale was considered a "New Woman": a successful, highly trained woman artist from the 19th century who never married. Other New Women artists include Elizabeth Coffin, Mary Cassatt, Elizabeth Nourse and Cecilia Beaux. Although Hale never married, she found a lifelong partner in fellow artist Gabrielle de Veaux Clements, whom she met in 1883. Hale and Clements became close friends in 1885 while they were enrolled at the Académie Julian in Paris. While traveling and studying in Europe together, Clements taught Hale how to etch. In 1893, the two artists returned to the United States. They moved into a house near Gloucester, Massachusetts, together and named it "The Thickets". The exact nature of their relationship is uncertain, but during this time, lifelong relationships between women were not uncommon and often referred to as "Boston marriages". Hale and Clements' relationship, like other "Boston marriages" of the time, provided the women with personal fulfillment and emotional support as each pursued professional careers as artists.

Hale moved to Santa Barbara, California, for two years in the 1890s, perhaps to improve her health after falling ill during her late twenties. In 1904, she moved to Washington, D.C., where she acted as her father's hostess during his time as chaplain for the U.S. Senate. As an unmarried woman, Hale did what was expected of her and devoted herself to the need of her parents. Despite these familial obligations, however, Hale never gave up her passion for art and continued to paint and make etchings for the rest of her life.

Hale was a distant cousin of the painter Margaret Lesley Bush-Brown, with whom she visited France and Belgium in 1881.

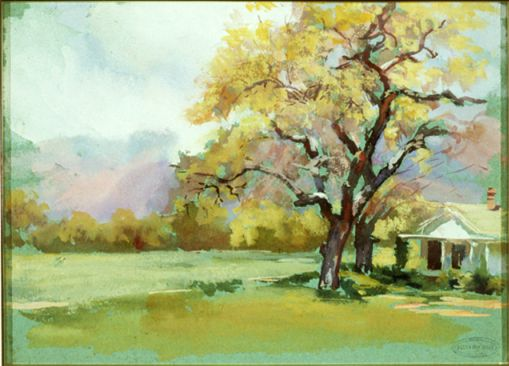
Summer Place, 1925, watercolor

== Career ==
Hale was an Impressionist painter, best known for her figure paintings, including many portraits and self-portraits. She made sophisticated, aesthetic paintings with good command of light, shadow and technical skill. She exhibited at the Boston Art Club in 1876. In Europe, she lived in London and Paris, where she exhibited at Paris Salon in 1885 her paintings An Old Retainer and Un Hiver Americain. In London's Royal Academy of Arts, she exhibited A New England Girl. In the United States she lived in Boston, and her work is associated with the Boston School. She made increasingly Impressionistic paintings, but like "many of her Boston colleagues, she did not compromise her dedication to painting the human form." Hale was very active in exhibiting her work, but only achieved marginal recognition of her art.

From 1918 to 1940, Hale and Clements wintered in Charleston, South Carolina, a city that was experiencing a burgeoning arts renaissance. Hale was fascinated by the local culture, as seen in the work she created during these residencies. She and Clements assisted in the organization of the Charleston Etchers' Club, a group established in 1923 to offer instruction on printmaking, encourage intellectual exchange, art criticism, and exhibition planning. Founding members of the club include Charleston Renaissance artists Elizabeth O'Neill Verner, Alfred Hutty, and Alice Ravenel Huger Smith. According to Verner's daughter, Hale and Clements stated: “We want to leave Charleston some of our skills . . . Get together a group so you can buy a press and we will show you how to use it . . . We’ll teach you, so you can teach them.”

Hale exhibited her work at the Palace of Fine Arts at the 1893 World's Columbian Exposition in Chicago, Illinois.

=== Notable works ===
==== Self-Portrait ====
Hale began painting her self-portrait in 1884, working on it at her family's home in Roxbury, Massachusetts, and at their summer home in Matunuck, Rhode Island. The painting, Self-Portrait, depicts Hale gazing confidently at the viewer with her right hand dangling slightly over the chair. Dressed in all black, Hale wears a dress with buttons and a fur collar, covered by a loose jacket. Peeking out of a round black hat are Hale's bangs, which at the time were praised as a youthful hairstyle but could also connote promiscuity. Hale seems to be making a fashion statement with her bangs, choice of costume, and the ostrich-feather fan that she holds. When Hale first showed the painting to her instructors in 1885, artist Bouguereau significantly criticized the size and position of the hand and encouraged Hale to make it "prettier". However, Hale did not make any of the suggested changes to the hand, refusing to conform her work to the idealized, academic notions of beauty. The compositional weight of her hand is also notable because it was extremely rare for artists of any gender to portray themselves looking directly at the viewer without any tools to identify their profession.

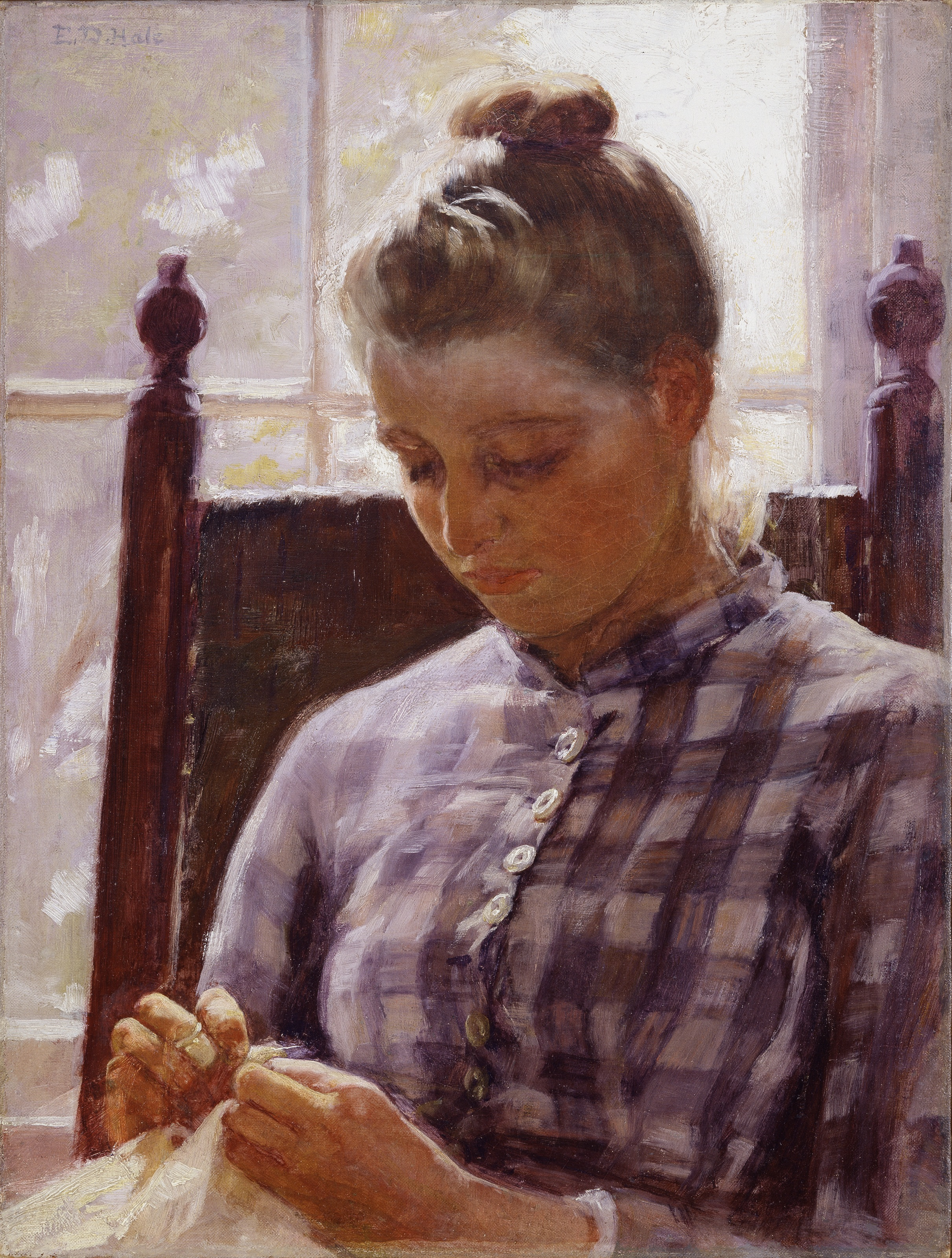
June, 1893, oil on canvas (24" x 18 1/8")

When Hale exhibited Self-Portrait in Boston, perhaps for the first time, in 1887, a critic, meaning to compliment her work, described it as displaying "a man's strength in the treatment and handling of her subjects." The Museum of Fine Arts, Boston, where the self-portrait is located, later commented, "Hale's forthright presentation, her strong dark colors, and the direct manner in which she engages the viewer recall the work of one of the French painters she most admired, Edouard Manet. Manet had been known for his confrontational images, strongly painted without subtle nuances of light and shadow." Hale was one of a handful of women of the time, including Elizabeth Nourse and Elizabeth Coffin, who "created compelling self-portraits in which they fearlessly presented themselves as individuals willing to flout social codes and challenge accepted ideas regarding women's place in society. Indeed, the New Women portraits of the 1880s and 1890s are unforgettable interpretations of energetic, self-confident and accomplished women." Hale created and displayed, in her own words, an "original and queer" representation of herself, and this daring assertion of identity marks her approach to the self-portrait as significant.

==== June ====
Hale's 1893 portrait, June, which depicts a young woman sewing, wearing a bun and a checked dress, is in the collection of the National Museum of Women in the Arts.

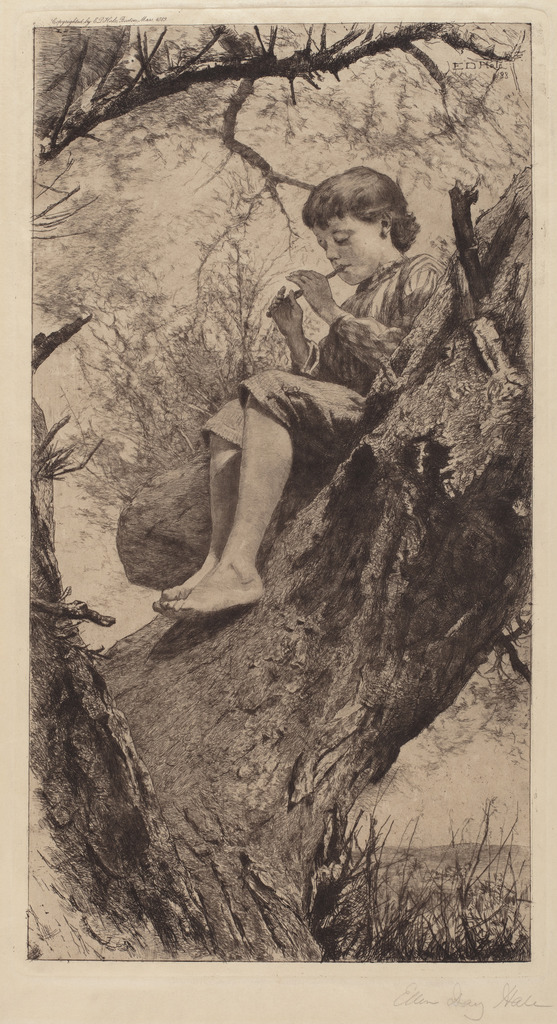
The Willow Whistle, 1888. Etching, paper: 24 3/4" x 17 3/4"; plate: 15 1/2" x 8 1/2"

=== Painter-etcher movement ===
During the nineteenth century, artists such as Hale were instrumental in reviving etching in America and Europe and restoring the significance of this technical medium. At the forefront of the Etching Revival of Hale's time was artist James Abbott McNeill Whistler, who set the standard for new generation of etchers. Clements first introduced Hale to etching while the pair was traveling in Europe. In terms of the etching process, Hale, like her contemporaries, used copper plates to produce clean, well-defined impressions. Hale experimented with a variety of etching techniques, including hard-ground, soft-ground, aquatint, and color inking. In the etching medium, Hale worked on a more intimate basis, using etchings to document her travels through the U.S., Europe, and the Middle East. Some of Hale's most accomplished prints include The Willow Whistle, which was produced using hard-ground etching and displayed at the Paris Salon, and First Night in Venice, which used the soft-ground process.

== Legacy ==
Hale played a major role as a mentor for a younger generation of aspiring women artists. She encouraged and gave concrete advice to the next group of New England female artists, cautioning them "against being too influenced by any one of their instructions...a fault common among artists of our sex." Hale not only taught classes for female artists, with Knowlton and on her own, but also hosted informal gatherings where likeminded women could discuss art. Included in this group of young artists was Hale's sister-in-law, Lilian Westcott Hale. Lilian and many other female artists benefited greatly from Hale's support and guidance.

Hale died in Brookline, Massachusetts, on February 11, 1940, her 85th birthday. Her works were shown in the latter part of the 20th century and early 21st century, in group exhibitions and in solo exhibitions of her work from 1989 to 1990 and in 2013's "Wanderer: Travel Prints by Ellen Day Hale." Hale's legacy is not only in her paintings and etchings but also in the acceptance she helped gain for women artists.

== Other works ==
- Early Vegetables, Charleston, S.C., Soft ground color etching, ca. 1918
- Lady with a Fan
- An Old Retainer
- A New England Girl
- Beppo
