= Elizabeth O'Neill =

Elizabeth O'Neill may refer to:

- Elizabeth O'Neill (official) (died 2007), Australian public servant and diplomat
- Elizabeth O'Neill (actress) (1791–1872), Irish actress
- Elizabeth O'Neill Verner (1883–1979), American artist
  - Elizabeth O'Neill Verner House, house named in her honor
- Elizabeth O'Neil, American computer scientist
- Elizabeth O'Neill, a fictional character from Teenage Mutant Ninja Turtles
