= William Posey =

William Posey may refer to:

- Bill Posey (1947–2026), American businessman and politician; U.S. Representative from Florida
- Willie Bernard Posey (died 2006), bodyguard of football player Tank Johnson
- William Posey Silva (1859–1948), American painter
