= Anna Taylor =

Anna Taylor may refer to:

- Anna Diggs Taylor (1932–2017), United States District Judge for the United States District Court for the Eastern District of Michigan
- Anna Taylor (nutritionist) (fl. 2026), British food specialist
- Anna Taylor (writer) (born 1982), New Zealand author
- Anna Taylor (cyclist) (born 1991), New Zealand Para cyclist
- Anna Heyward Taylor (1879–1956), painter and printmaker

== See also ==
- Ann Taylor (disambiguation)
- Annie Taylor (disambiguation)
