= Gabrielle D. Clements =

American painter (1858–1948)

Gabrielle de Veaux Clements
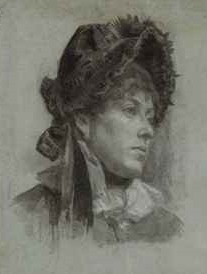
- Ellen Day Hale, Portrait of a Woman, said to be Gabrielle Clements, 1883, Paris
- Born: September 11, 1858; Philadelphia, Pennsylvania
- Died: March 26, 1948 (aged 89); Folly Cove, Cape Ann, Massachusetts
- Education: Philadelphia School of Design for Women (1875); Cornell University (1876–1880); Pennsylvania Academy of the Fine Arts (1881–1882); Académie Julian (c. 1884))
- Movement: Realism
- Partner: Ellen Day Hale
- Awards: Toppan Prize, Pennsylvania Academy of the Fine Arts

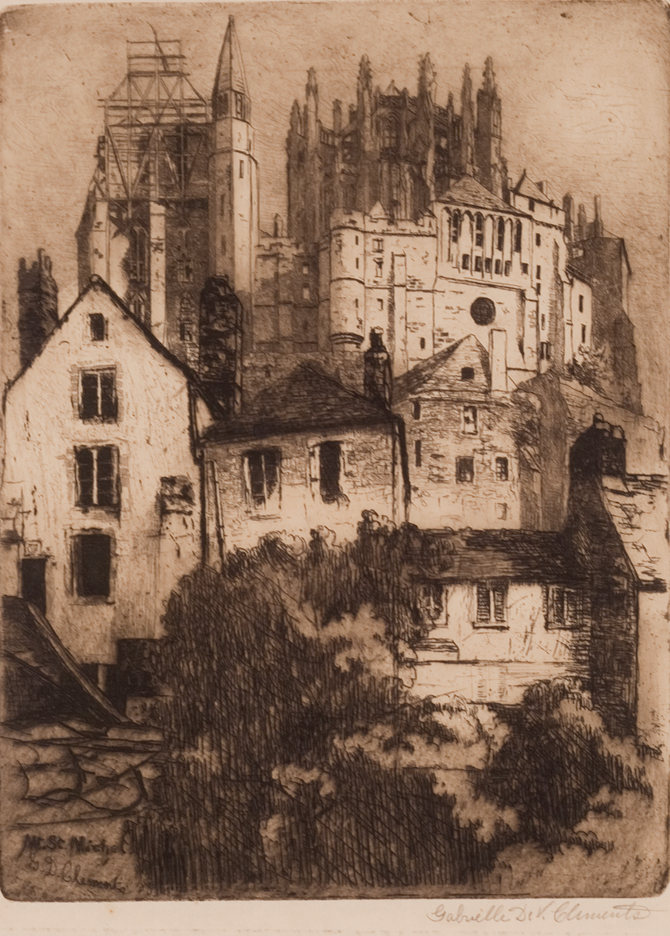
Church and Castle, Mont Saint-Michel, 1885

Gabrielle de Veaux Clements (September 11, 1858 – March 26, 1948) was an American painter, print maker, and muralist. She studied art at the Philadelphia School of Design for Women, Pennsylvania Academy of the Fine Arts, and in Paris at Académie Julian. Clements also studied science at Cornell University and graduated with a Bachelor of Science degree. She created murals, painted portraits, and made etchings. Clements taught in Philadelphia and in Baltimore at Bryn Mawr School. Her works have been exhibited in the United States and at the Paris Salon. Clements works are in several public collections. Her life companion was fellow artist Ellen Day Hale.

== Early life ==
Gabrielle de Veaux Clements was born in Philadelphia in 1858. Her parents were Dr. Richard Clements and Gabriella DeVeaux. Her mother, Gabriella DeVeaux, was from South Carolina. American Revolutionary War hero General Francis Marion, her maternal ancestor, was called "Swamp Fox". Clements attended Miss Longstreth's school in Philadelphia and developed an interest in art as a teenager.

== Education ==
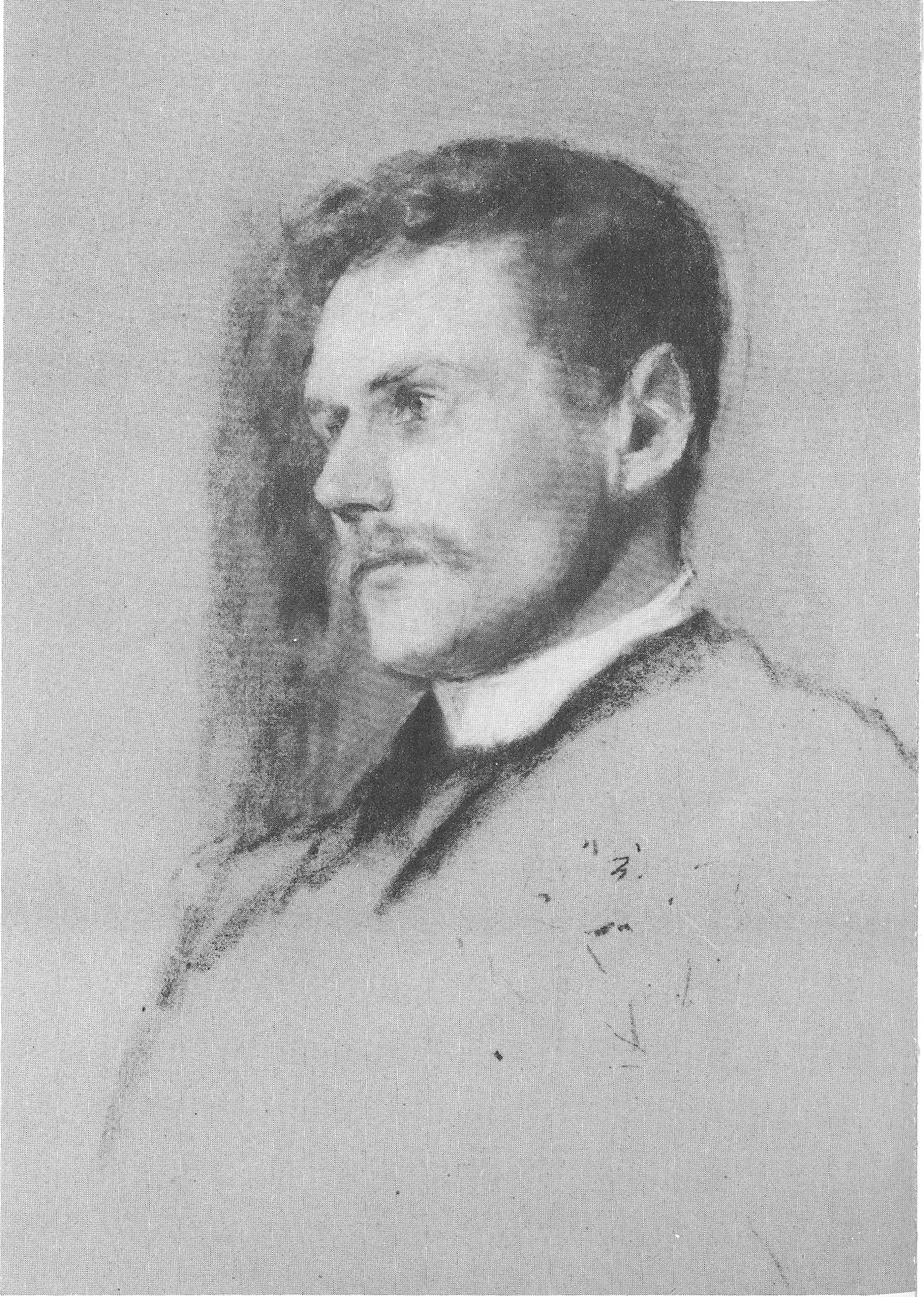
Samuel Hill, 1889

In 1875, Clements attended the Philadelphia School of Design for Women in Philadelphia under Charles Page, with whom she studied lithography. She then attended Cornell University in Ithaca, New York from 1876 to 1880, where she studied science, made scientific drawings, and received her Bachelor of Science degree. Her senior thesis was A Study of Two German Masters in Medieval Art, Dürer and Holbein. After completing her studies at Cornell, Clements returned to Philadelphia and attended the Pennsylvania Academy of the Fine Arts from 1881 to 1882, under Thomas Eakins. She won the school's Toppan Prize. Stephen Parrish taught her to be an etcher in 1883. She produced a number of lithographs and scientific drawings during her school years.

In 1883, she met American Impressionist Ellen Day Hale, who would become her travel and life companion. About 1884, she attended the Académie Julian in Paris. Clements studied under William-Adolphe Bouguereau and Tony Robert-Fleury. Hale went to Paris with her. In 1885, Clements exhibited at the Paris Salon and as the women traveled through France, Clements taught Hale to etch.

== Career ==
=== Painter and etcher ===
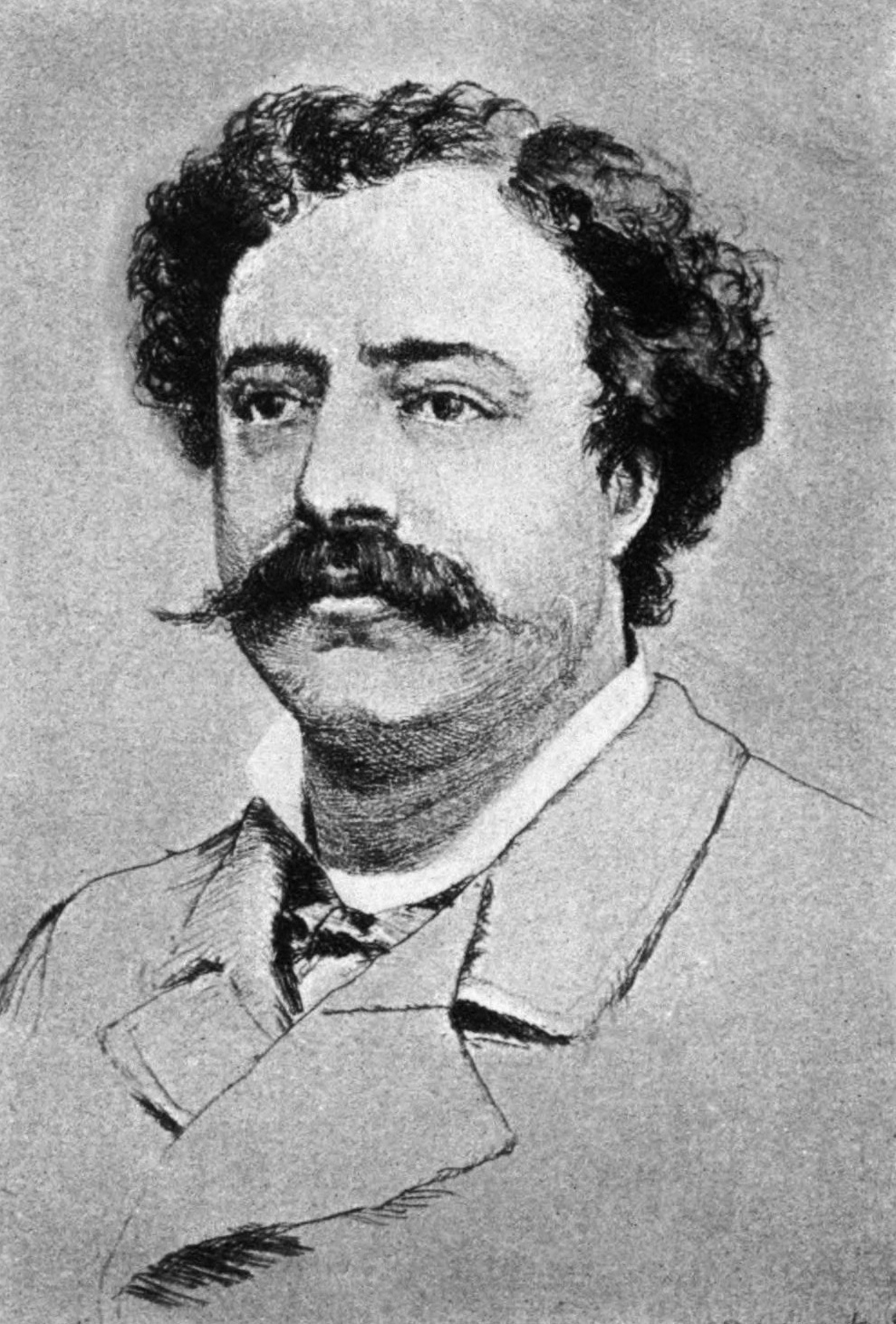
Edmondo De Amicis, 1898, etching

In 1883, Clements began working professionally, making prints and exhibiting her works. She created the appearance of 3-dimensions by overlapping, or interposition, in Church and Castle, Mont Saint-Michel (1885). In 1888, Clements exhibited 20 of her works at The Work of Women Etchers of America show held by the Union League of New York, led on by Sylvester Rosa Koehler. Held at the Museum of Fine Arts, Boston, it was the first show held at a museum of women's works of art. David Tatham considered the exhibitions led by Koehler in the late 1880s to be "ground-breaking women etcher's shows". Her etchings were based upon modern French techniques, like a la poupée, and were influenced by Woodblock printing in Japan and the works of James Abbott McNeill Whistler.

Clement made a portrait of Edmondo De Amicis, which was printed in an extra volume of etchings and photogravures to his 1888 book Spain and the Spaniards. She illustrated a book of verses entitled Easter Song by Charlotte Pendleton, which was published in 1892.

Clements painted sea, city and landscapes of places in the United States, like Cape Ann, Massachusetts and Baltimore, Maryland and other locations along the American East Coast. She also captured foreign destinations, like Palestine, Algiers, and France. During her career, her work was exhibited at a number of venues, some of which are the Museum of Fine Arts, Boston, National Academy of Design, Philadelphia Society of Artists, National Museum of American History, and New York Etching Club. Clements' etchings were exhibited at international exhibitions alongside the works of Francis Seymour Haden and James Abbott McNeill Whistler. Clement exhibited her work at the Woman's Building and the Pennsylvania State Building at the 1893 World's Columbian Exposition in Chicago, Illinois. She also exhibited at the Louisiana Purchase Exposition of 1904, and the Sesquicentennial Exposition in 1926.

=== Muralist ===
Clements painted five murals for churches in Washington, D.C., and in Baltimore she painted views of the city for Bendann Galleries and a mural of Oh, praise ye the Lord, al ye His angels. Clements also painted murals in Detroit, Chicago, and Philadelphia. Her mural, Harvest, was made for the World's Columbian Exposition of 1893 and the 9 by 13 feet (2.7 by 4.0 m) work of art is now in the Cape Ann Museum collection and was conserved during a 2009 to 2010 exhibition at the museum. In 1910, she made a 10 by 22 feet (3.0 by 6.7 m) mural on canvas. In 2014, it was in the process of being restored at the Hugh McCall Mansion, site of the Women's Club of York, Pennsylvania. The plan was also to frame it in a 400-pound wood frame.

=== Educator ===
She taught art at Baltimore's The Bryn Mawr School from 1895 to 1908. There she taught new techniques, like working with aquatint and color etching, by the turn of the 20th century, etching was not a profitable endeavor. She also taught art in Philadelphia. Clements taught print making, etching, and painting in Charleston, South Carolina with Hale during the winters during World War I or more specifically, from 1916 to 1920. They helped inspire the creation of the Charleston Etchers' Club and influence the Charleston Renaissance and over time the works of Lesley Jackson, Alice Ravenel Huger Smith, and Elizabeth O'Neill Verner.

== Personal and public life ==
Beginning about 1880, Clements assisted Eliza Sproat Turner and Florence Kelley in the establishment of New Century Guild of Philadelphia. It offered educational classes and programs for working women.

Hale and Clements vacationed and painted together during the summers at a house they bought, "The Thickets" in an artist's enclave in Folly Cove on Cape Ann, Massachusetts. In addition to Charleston, South Carolina, Clements and Hale traveled to Europe during the winter months. Margaret Lesley Bush-Brown, who was one of Clements' students; Cecilia Beaux; and Lilian Westcott Hale, Ellen Day Hale's sister-in-law, were their friends.

== Death ==
She died in 1948 at Rockport, Folly Cove, Massachusetts on March 26, 1948. Her works were exhibited 1994–95 at the Washington Print Club Thirtieth Anniversary Exhibition: Graphic Legacy and in 2005 at the Revival and the Professional Woman Artist, both of which were conducted by the National Museum of Women in the Arts. Her sketchbooks, correspondence, photographs, and other papers are in the Archives of American Art at the Smithsonian Institution.

== Collections ==
- Academy of Vocal Arts, Philadelphia - A collection of seven oil paintings by Ellen Day Hale and Gabrielle Clements
- Baltimore City Circuit Court, Maryland - Hon. George William Brown (1812–1890)
- Baltimore Public Library
- Bryn Mawr College Library Collection - Mary E. Garrett, 1917, made after a portrait by John Singer Sargent, 1904
- Cape Ann Museum, Massachusetts - Harvest, 9 by 13 feet (2.7 by 4.0 m) mural, made for the Columbian Exposition of 1893
- Greenville County Museum of Art, South Carolina - Garden Path, 1919
- Johns Hopkins Medical Institutions - Prints and drawings, Fine and Decorative Arts, Medical Archives (Note: It is an etching of Johns Hopkins Hospital.)
- Maryland State Museum, Annapolis
- National Museum of Women in the Arts, Washington, D.C. - Church and Castle, Mont Saint Michel, 1885
- Smithsonian Institution
Paintings by Gabrielle de Veaux Clements

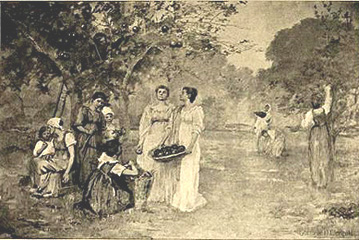
Harvest, Cape Ann Museum, exhibited at World's Columbian Exposition, 1893

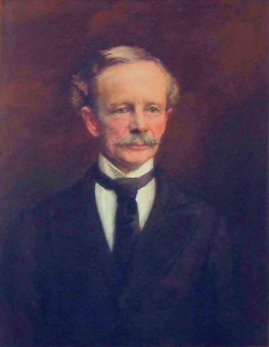
Hon. George William Brown, 1901, Baltimore City Circuit Court

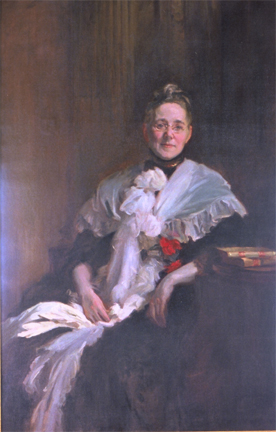
Mary E. Garrett, 1917, Bryn Mawr College Library collection (Note: The portrait of Mary Garrett was made after a portrait by John Singer Sargent, 1904)

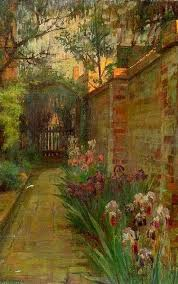
Garden Path, 1919, Greenville County Museum of Art, South Carolina
