= Anne Allen =

Anne Allen or Ann Allen may refer to:

- Anne Allen (married 1766), wife of Pennsylvania governor John Penn
- Ann Taylor Allen (graduated 1965), professor of German history at the University of Louisville
- Ann Savoy née Allen (born 1952), American musician, author and record producer
- Ann Allen Shockley (born 1927), American journalist and author
- Anne Allen Westbrook, American politician from Georgia
- Elizabeth Anne Allen (born 1969), American actress

== See also ==
- Allen (surname)
