= Augusta Oelschig =

American painter (1918–2000)

- Born: Augusta Denk Oelschig; June 12, 1918; Savannah, Georgia, US
- Died: July 14, 2000 (aged 82); Oberlin, Louisiana, US

Augusta Oelschig (June 12, 1918 – July 14, 2000) was an American Scene painter known for realist genre paintings of everyday life in Savannah, Georgia, and elsewhere in the American South. In mid-career, she began to incorporate social criticism into her work. In depicting victims of racism, she produced what one curator called "emotionally intense" works that set her apart from the other painters of her time and place. Her career spanned some three decades, from about 1940 to 1975.

Born and raised in Savannah, Georgia, Oelschig took an early interest in art as a career. She received encouragement from public school teachers and, after graduating from a local two-year college, benefited from training by Lamar Doddin the art department at the University of Georgia from which she graduated with a Bachelor of Fine Arts degree in 1939. Apart from ten months studying in Mexico City and a decade in New York, Oelschig worked exclusively in Savannah. She exhibited widely at museums, universities, and other nonprofit organizations, but infrequently at commercial galleries.

Although Oelschig mainly painted figure subjects, two of her best-known works show a carousel that had been destroyed by fire. She worked mainly in oil on canvas or board and occasionally graphite, gouache, or conte on paper. Her paintings ordinarily came from sketches and tended to be easel-sized. Late in her career, she studied under nonobjective artists and produced abstract works using lacquer, acrylic, and papier-mâché.

== Early life and training ==
Oelschig was born and raised in Savannah, Georgia. Two art teachers, Linda Trogden and Lila Marguerite Cabaniss, stimulated her interest in art while she was a student in the city's public schools. (Note: A New-York trained artist as well as an influential art and literature teacher, Cabaniss spent a long career in Savannah public schools.) When she graduated from high school in 1936, she hoped to attend a four-year college but her father, despite his ownership of a successful flower business, found that paying for the college education of her three older siblings left him unable to afford the additional cost. She consequently began study at a newly-formed, municipally-funded two-year school called Armstrong Junior College. Oelschig also took private classes from well-known local artist Emma Cheves Wilkins, who specialized in portraits and floral still lifes. In 1937, Oelschig was able to transfer to the University of Georgia, having obtained a job as an illustrator in the university's archaeology department. (Note: Oelschig obtained the job via a New Deal agency, called the National Youth Administration, focused on providing work and education for Americans between the ages of 16 and 25.) Soon after her arrival on campus, she was accepted as a member of a national honorary society of student artists called Kappa Pi. In 1939, she received the second-place prize for painting called "Portrait of an Old Man" at the university's annual student exhibition. She graduated later that year with a Bachelor of Fine Arts degree.

== Career in art ==
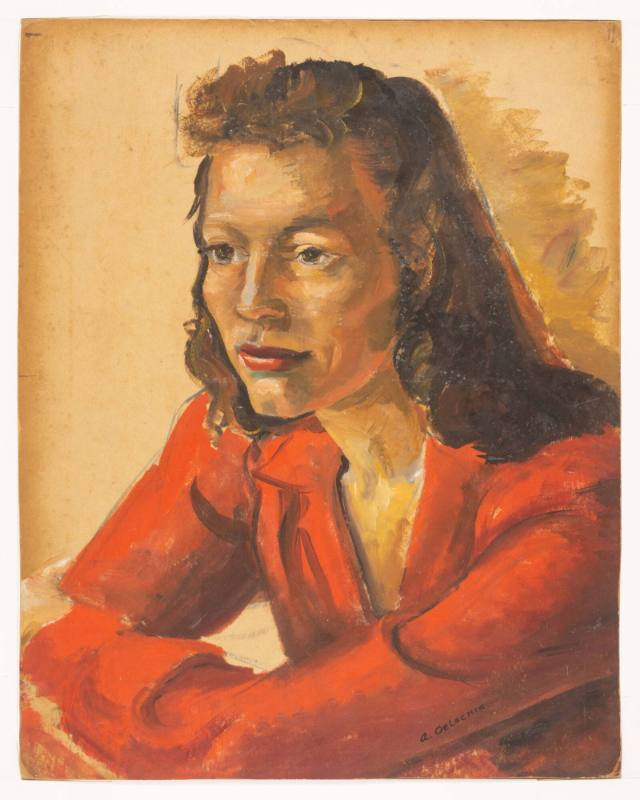
Augusta Oelschig, 1942, Ozela Taylor, oil on board, 14 1/4 x 12 inches

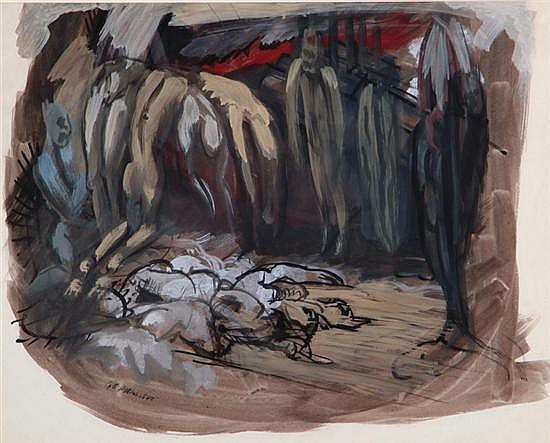
Augusta Oelschig, 1950, Do Unto Others, watercolor, 10 1/2 x 13 inches

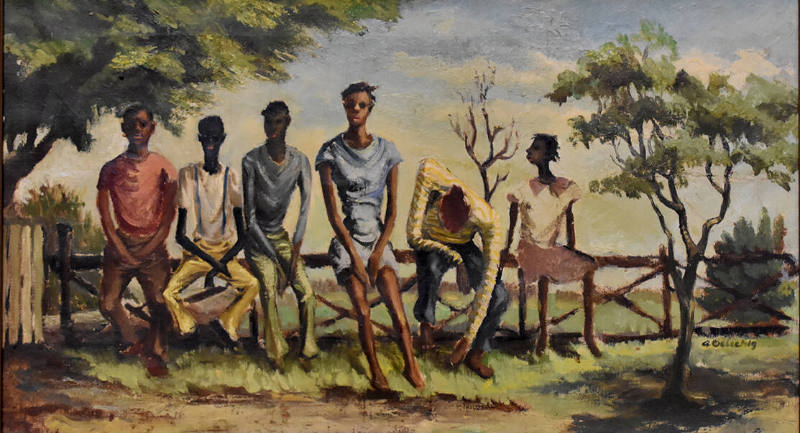
Augusta Oelschig, 1953, Sparrows, oil on canvas, 16 1/4 x 28 7/8 inches

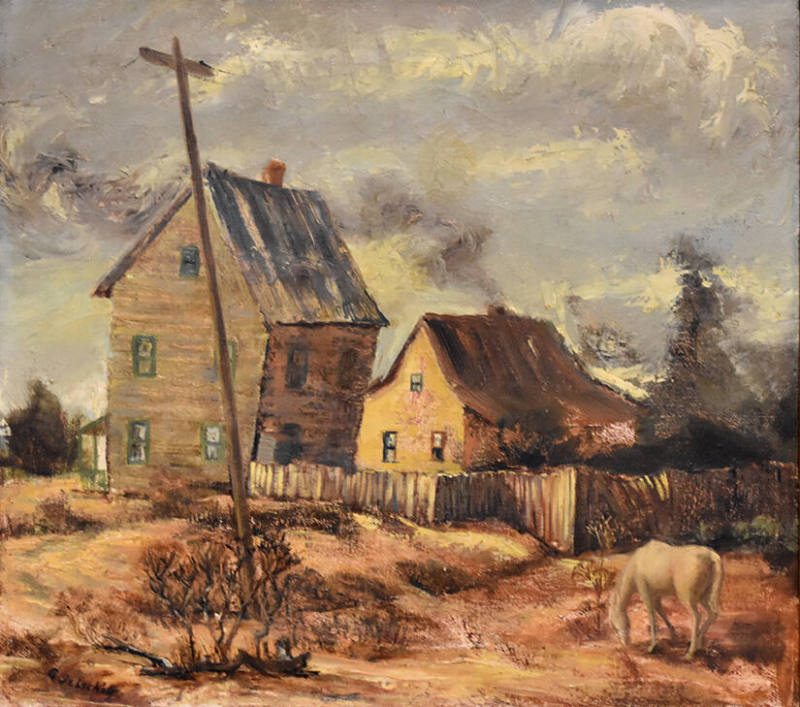
Augusta Oelschig, 1955, Winter Scene, oil on canvas, 18 x 20 inches

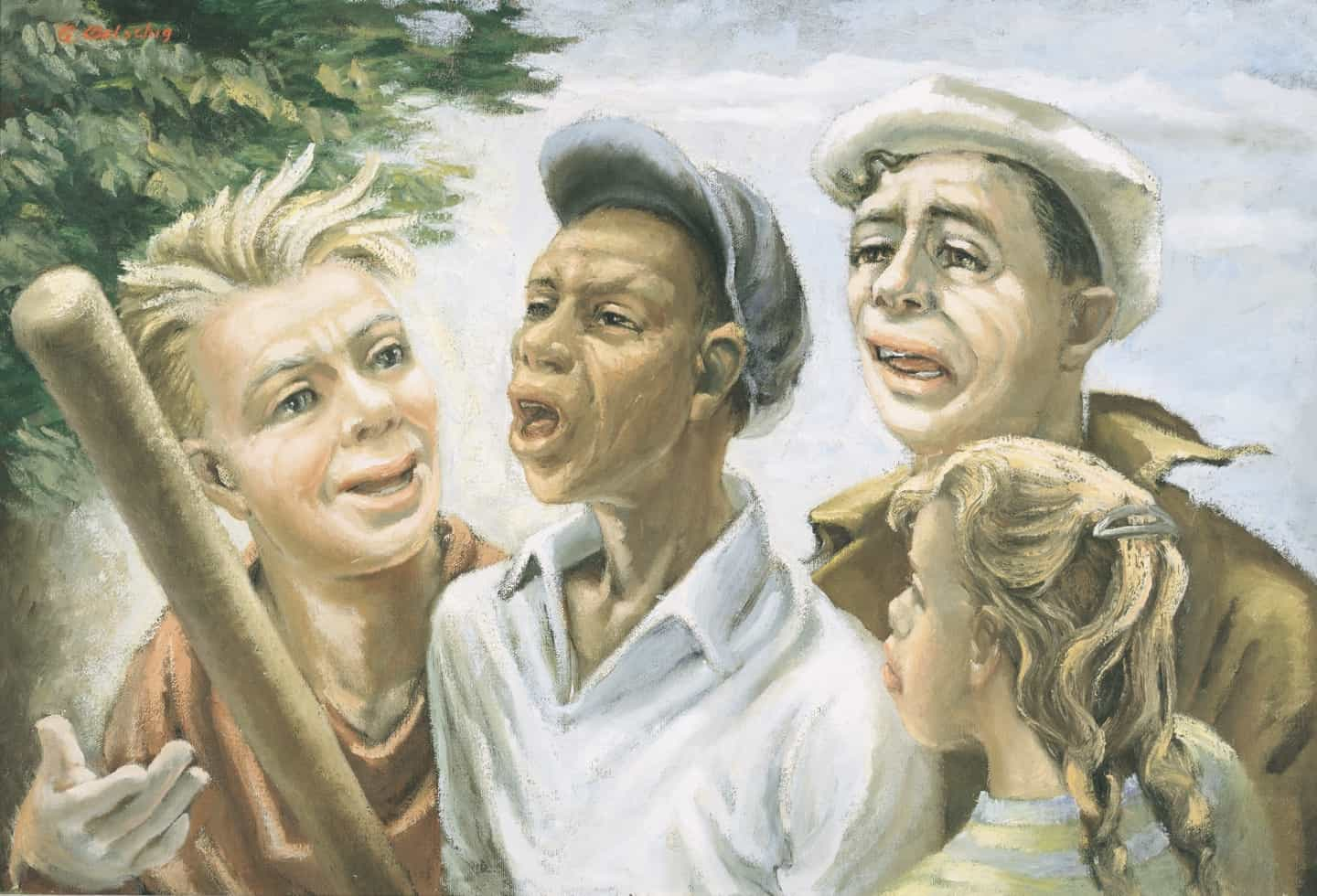
Augusta Oelschig, about 1955, Play Ball, oil on canvas, 17 x 25 inches

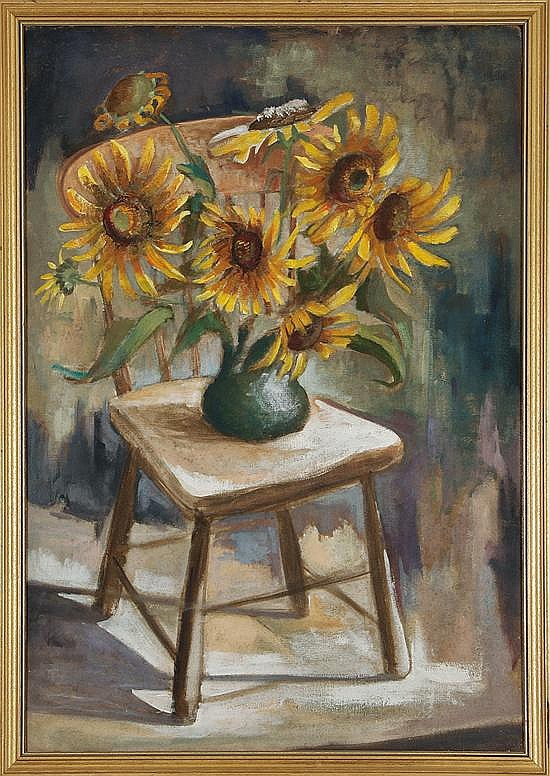
Augusta Oelschig, about 1960, Sunflowers, oil on masonite, 28 3/4 x 41 3/4 inches

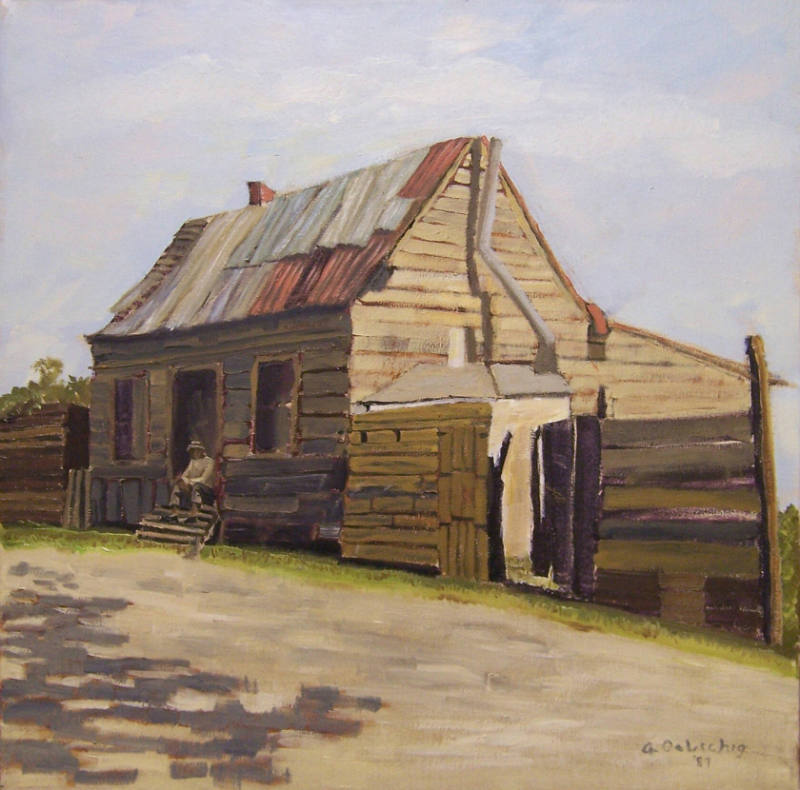
Augusta Oelschig, 1987, House with Figure, oil on canvas, 20 x 20 inches

Oelschig returned to Savannah after graduating from the University of Georgia and, in November 1939, participated in an exhibition held by the Association of Georgia Artists that was held at the university. At that time, using the prize money she had received for her senior exhibition award, she began private lessons with artist Henry Lee McFee who had recently arrived in Savannah. McFee made a series of paintings of Black women while in the city. When McFee departed a few months later, Oelschig took over the waterfront studio he had rented. The following year, she agreed to share the studio with another artist known for still lifes and figure painting, Alexander Brook. Her close association with him during the two years he lived and worked in the city helped her to refine the style she was then developing.

At an Association of Georgia Artists' exhibition of 1940, judges awarded Oelschig first place for a portrait called "Young Boy". The prize included purchase of the painting for the permanent collection of the University of Georgia. In the early 1940s, she also exhibited with the Southern States Art League, in Atlanta, and the Savannah Art Club. The recognition these exhibitions gave her and in particular the award she won resulted in local recognition, some sales, and a decision to make art her life's work.

In 1941, Savannah's Telfair Academy of Arts and Sciences (now the Telfair Museum of Art) gave her a solo exhibition and the following year the Montgomery Museum of Fine Arts also gave her one. At this time, she turned down a fellowship at the Art Academy of Cincinnati to accept a temporary teaching position at Alabama Polytechnic Institute (now Auburn University). During these years, she participated in a traveling exhibition sponsored by the Association of Georgia Artists, a stand-alone exhibition of the Southeastern Artists Association, and an exhibition of faculty artists held at the Montgomery Museum of Fine Arts. When the teaching position ended in 1943, Oelschig returned to Savannah and found work as a display manager in an upscale department store. She also established an art school with an initial class of 35 students. In the mid-1940s, she taught adult education classes at Armstrong Junior College. In 1945, she became an officer of the Association of Georgia Artists.

In February 1947, Oelschig married a man named James Petressen. Four and a half years her junior, he had served in the merchant marine and US Army during the war and would, after their marriage, embark on a career in public relations. The couple spent most of the year traveling in Mexico. While staying in Mexico City, Oelschig studied art at Mexico City College where she met Diego Rivera, José Clemente Orozco, and other revolutionary and populist muralists. Impressed by the muralists' radical political ideals, Oelschig began to depict aspects of Southern racial injustice in her paintings. After returning to Savannah in 1948, she made sketches showing images of violent racial violence for a mural to be called "Love Thy Neighbor" to be installed in the city's all-white segregated high school. Disheartened by the decision of authorities to abandon the project, she left Savannah for New York. At this time, her former teacher, Lamar Dodd, referred to her as "a talented and imaginative young artist with the tools to produce the very personal and regional scenes of Social consequence." Although her output declined somewhat at this time, she had enough work to exhibit in a show at the Feragil Gallery and submitted a painting called "Fence Sitters" in an open competition for a solo exhibition at the ACA Galleries.

Between 1960 and 1963, the Civil Rights protest movement in Savannah resulted in the complete abandonment of the city's system of racial segregation and a firm commitment to improve the living conditions of its African-American citizens. In 1962, Oelschig's marriage dissolved. she and Petressen divorced and she returned to live and work in Savannah. During the rest of the 1960s, she gave private instruction to art students in her studio. She also studied nonobjective art with fellow artists Bill Hendrix and William Scharf and, while remaining committed to the realistic style for which she is best known, made a few experiments with abstraction. During these years, she exhibited her work with the Savannah Art Association, at the Columbia Museum of Art in South Carolina, and at the Hirschl and Adler Galleries in New York. Her last major work was a mural celebrating the nation's bicentennial commissioned by the chamber of commerce. Called "Life and Times in Savannah" it contained mixed-media depictions of well-known buildings and sites in the region. Executed between 1972 and 1975, it was originally hung in the New Home Central Bank on Telfair Square and later in the office of the Savannah chamber of commerce.

Oelschig's health declined in the mid-1970s and she stopped painting about 1976. In 1995, the Telfair Museum of Art produced a televised video interview with her. Her paintings appeared in a 1996 exhibition at the Telfair called "Looking Back: Art in Savannah, 1900–1960". In 1997, she was named one of Georgia's Women in the Visual Arts. Oelschig died on 24 July 2000. A retrospective exhibition of her work was held at the Telfair from September through November of that year. Two years later, her work was featured in an exhibition at the Morris Museum of Art in Augusta.

=== Artistic style and critical reception ===
Augusta Oelschig, from Savannah, devoted her talents to subjects that would have been easier to ignore. Many of her paintings are genre scenes of black life, but some present scenes of terrible social injustice.

— The South, a Treasure of Art and Literature (1993, Levin Associates, Connecticut, page 247)

Although she experimented with automobile lacquer, ink, acrylic, and papier-mâché during the early 1960s, she mainly employed oil, gouache, or graphite. Critics noted that, with the exception of a short period of experimentation, on the whole, Oelschig remained faithful to her early realist style. They noted too, that she was one of the first Southern artists of her generation to use painting as a means of social commentary. Writing in 1992, a curator wrote that much of Oelschig's art in the 1950s and early 1960s "dealt with the serious social injustice of Southern race relations" and said her paintings were "far braver than the spirit of the times would have tolerated."

A pair of mid-career paintings have attracted critical attention. Made during the time when she lived in Manhattan, they take as their subject the carousel in the city's Central Park that had been destroyed by fire in 1950. Oelschig said the first, "Death of a Carousel" of 1951, was a meditation on the end of life, and the second, "In Memoriam" of 1952, on life after death. A curator wrote that, the paintings' "tough spirituality and grotesque figuration suggest a southern Gothic sensibility".

== Personal life and family ==
Oelschig's father was Carl Henry Oelschig, a prominent Savannah florist. Her mother was Josephine (Denk) Oelschig, who ran the family household. The Oelschigs were an old Savannah family. Oelschig was the youngest of four siblings.

She died on July 14, 2000.
