= William R. Hollingsworth Jr. =

American painter

- Born: February 17, 1910; Jackson, Mississippi, U.S.
- Died: August 1, 1944 (aged 34); Jackson, Mississippi
- Education: University of Mississippi; Chicago Art Institute
- Occupation: Painter
- Spouse: Jane Oakley
- Children: 1

William R. Hollingsworth Jr. (February 17, 1910 – August 1, 1944) was an American watercolor and oil painter from the state of Mississippi. He died by suicide at age 34.

== Early life ==
William R. Hollingsworth Jr. was born on February 17, 1910, in Jackson, Mississippi. He attended the University of Mississippi for two years and then transferred to the Chicago Art Institute, graduating in 1934.

== Career ==
Hollingsworth returned to Jackson, Mississippi after failing to find work in Chicago during the Great Depression. He worked for the Federal Emergency Relief Administration during the day and painted at night. In 1942, during the Second World War, he tried to enlist in the United States Navy, but his application was rejected due to "poor eyesight" within two weeks.

Hollingsworth specialized in oil paintings and watercolors. Many of his paintings depicted the lives of African-Americans in West Jackson during segregation. He won prizes from the Chicago Arts Club, the Southern States Art League and the National Watercolor Society.

== Personal life, death and legacy ==
Hollingsworth married Jane Oakley, and they had a son, Billy. He committed suicide by gunshot on August 1, 1944, in Jackson, Mississippi, aged 34. Eudora Welty wrote a book about him, published posthumously in 2002. Some of his paintings can be seen at the Mississippi Museum of Art in Jackson, Mississippi.
