= Anna Heyward Taylor =

American painter

Anna Heyward Taylor (November 13, 1879 – March 4, 1956) was a painter and printmaker who is considered one of the leading artists of the Charleston Renaissance.

== Early life and education ==
Anna Heyward Taylor was born November 13, 1879, in Columbia, South Carolina, one of eight children of Benjamin Walter Taylor—a physician and surgeon who had served in the Civil War in the Army of Northern Virginia—and Marianna (Heyward) Taylor. The Taylor family was prominent in the cotton industry and in the development of the city of Columbia. Her older brother Thomas Taylor would later build Taylor House, which became the first location of the Columbia Museum of Art.

Taylor received education at the South Carolina College for Women, graduating in 1897. She traveled to Holland in 1903 to study with the painter William Merritt Chase, afterward traveling around Europe for another few years as well as to China and Japan in 1914. Taylor served eighteen months in the American Red Cross in France and Germany during World War I, spending most of the years 1917–19 in France. She was the first woman from South Carolina to serve with the Red Cross in France during the war.

On her return to America, Taylor went to Radcliffe College for graduate work and spent the summers of 1915 and 1916 in Provincetown, Massachusetts, studying printmaking with B.J.O. Nordfeldt at the Provincetown Print workshop. There she became expert in a technique she would often use, white-line woodblock printing, in which most of the print is a solid color with the image formed by white (uninked) lines. This technique makes it possible for an artist to print multiple colors from the same block rather than requiring a separate block for each color.

== Career ==
As a mature artist, Taylor painted in both oils and watercolor, but she preferred printmaking, especially woodcuts and linocuts. Her style is pictorial with strong graphic lines showing the influence of both modernism and her travels in Asia. Her images were generally printed either in bold colors or in stark black-and-white. With flattened perspective, large areas of color, and limited details, Taylor's prints have echoes of Arts and Crafts prints by artists such as William S. Rice, as well as some of Henri Matisse's work. She also worked occasionally in textiles such as batik-printed silk. Taylor’s drawings, watercolors, and gouaches not only captured an exotic plant’s appearance but the changes of shape and color that occurred during its life cycle. She also found time to paint and make studies on her own that she would turn into block prints later. “You can make your watercolors on the spot,” she told Tobias, “but you can’t do it with block prints. You can’t carry all your materials and equipment around with you.

In 1916, Taylor accompanied William Beebe's expedition to British Guiana as a scientific illustrator, and she returned again with Beebe in 1920. On both trips, she made botanical studies that greatly influenced her work and that she later translated into prints and batik textiles. For some of these works, her designs drew not just on visible plant parts but also on microscopic sections of stems, ovaries, etc. They were shown at the Museum of Natural History in New York and at the Brooklyn Botanic Gardens in 1922, and they may represent the first time that microscopic details of plants were used in decorative art.

Taylor moved to New York City in 1920, remaining there until the end of the decade, when she returned to South Carolina, settling in Charleston. She lived at 79 Church Street and opened a studio on Atlantic Street, where several other leaders of the Charleston Renaissance also had studios. Although she thereafter became closely associated with Charleston's art scene, she continued to travel at intervals; for example spending time in the 1930s in an artist's colony in Taxco, Mexico.

In Charleston, Taylor became known for her prints illustrating life in the South Carolina Lowcountry, including agricultural subjects both past and present, local fauna and flora, architecture, street scenes, and the city's tradespeople. A print of African-American women harvesting rice (Harvesting Rice, ca. 1930) was one of five works chosen to represent the city at the 1939 New York World's Fair. In 1949, she illustrated a book by Chalmers Swinton Murray entitled This Our Land: The Story of the Agricultural Society of South Carolina, which provided a picturesque account of aspects of the state's agricultural history.

Along with Alice Ravenel Huger Smith, Elizabeth O'Neill Verner, and Alfred Hutty, Taylor is today considered one of the four leading artists of the Charleston Renaissance. Her works are in the collections of the Columbia Museum of Art, the Greenville County Museum of Art, the Gibbes Museum of Art in Charleston, the Morris Museum of Art in Augusta, the American Museum of Natural History, the Brooklyn Botanical Gardens, and other institutions. In 2010 her nephew, Dr. Edmund Rhett Taylor, along with Alexander Moore, had a collection of her letters published by the University of South Carolina Press - Selected Letters of Anna Heyward Taylor, South Carolina Artist and World Traveler.

Taylor died March 4, 1956. Her letters and other papers are in the collection of the South Caroliniana Library at the University of South Carolina.

== See also ==
- Provincetown Printers, an art colony in Provincetown, Massachusetts
