= Annie Taylor =

Annie Taylor may refer to:

- Annie Edson Taylor (1838–1921), first American to ride Niagara Falls in a barrel
- Annie Taylor Hyde (1849–1909), American Mormon leader and Utah pioneer
- Annie Royle Taylor (1855–1922), British evangelist to China and Tibetan explorer

== See also ==
- Ann Taylor (disambiguation)
- Anna Taylor (disambiguation)
