= Chauncey Foster Ryder =

American painter

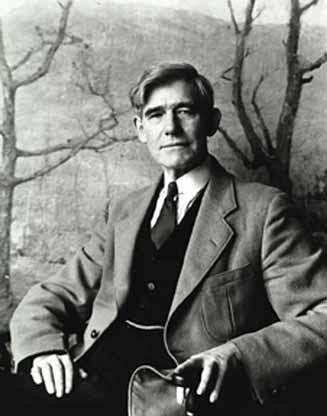
Chauncey Foster Ryder; photograph by Peter A. Juley

Chauncey Foster Ryder (29 February 1868 – 18 May 1949) was an early 20th century American Postimpressionist landscape painter known for a green-gray palette termed 'Ryder green'.

== Education and personal life ==
Ryder was born in 1868 in Danbury, Connecticut, but grew up mainly in New Haven. He began studying painting as a boy. In his early twenties, he moved to Chicago to attend the Art Institute, then Smith's Academy. After only a year at the latter, he was hired as an instructor.

In 1891, he married Mary Dole Keith. In 1901, they moved to Paris, France, where Ryder continued his art education, studying with Jean-Paul Laurens at the Académie Julian. Ryder stayed in France for several years, living in an art colony at Étaples and exhibiting his work at the Paris Salon (1903–1909). He took on occasional students, including American painter William Posey Silva. His developing style was influenced by the dramatic compositions of his friend, painter Max Bohm, and by his admiration for the Japanese artist Hokusai.

== Career ==
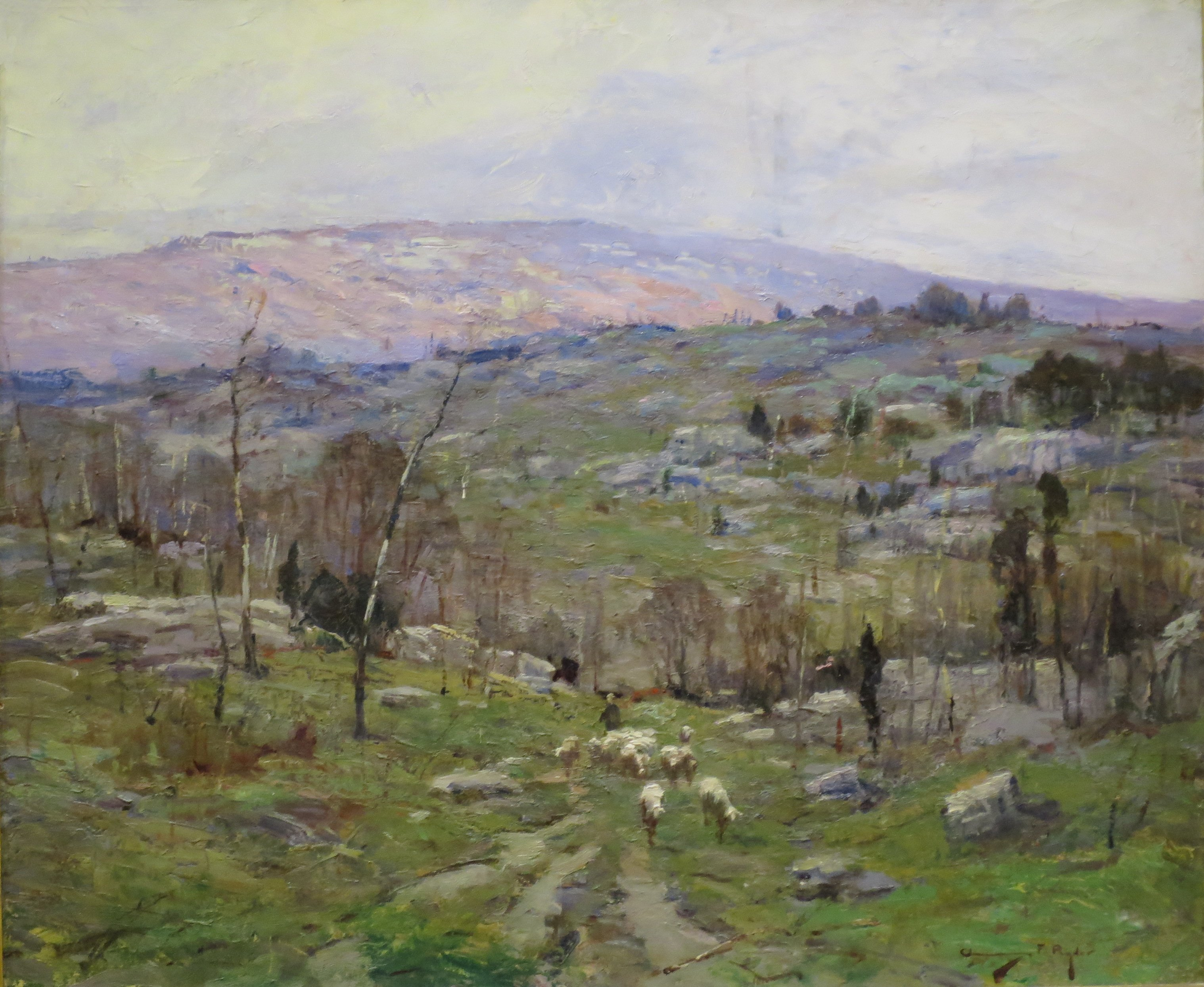
Shepherds with Sheep

In 1907, Ryder moved to New York City, where he was represented for the rest of his career by art dealer William Macbeth. His landscapes were admired for their vigorous brushwork, and the degree to which he pushed representational elements towards abstraction. He became known for a palette of predominantly gray-green tones, eventually known as 'Ryder green'.

Ryder created many works in oil and watercolor. Around 1910 he began making prints, including lithographs, etchings, and drypoints. His best drypoints exhibit great economy of line.

He opened a studio in the city in 1909, and the following year bought property in Wilton, New Hampshire. For the remainder of his life, he divided his time between New York and New Hampshire.

In 1910, he traveled throughout New England, providing locales for many of his subsequent paintings. That year, future president Woodrow Wilson and his wife Ellen bought one of his landscapes, Valley of Assisi, to celebrate their 25th wedding anniversary.

Ryder was a member of several art associations, including the American Water Color Society and the Society for Sanity in Art. Among his awards were the Paris Salon (honorable mention, 1907), the American Water Color Society (gold medal), the National Arts Club (gold medal), and the New York Water Color Society (gold medal). He also received awards at the 1915 Panama–Pacific International Exposition and the 1937 Paris International Exposition.

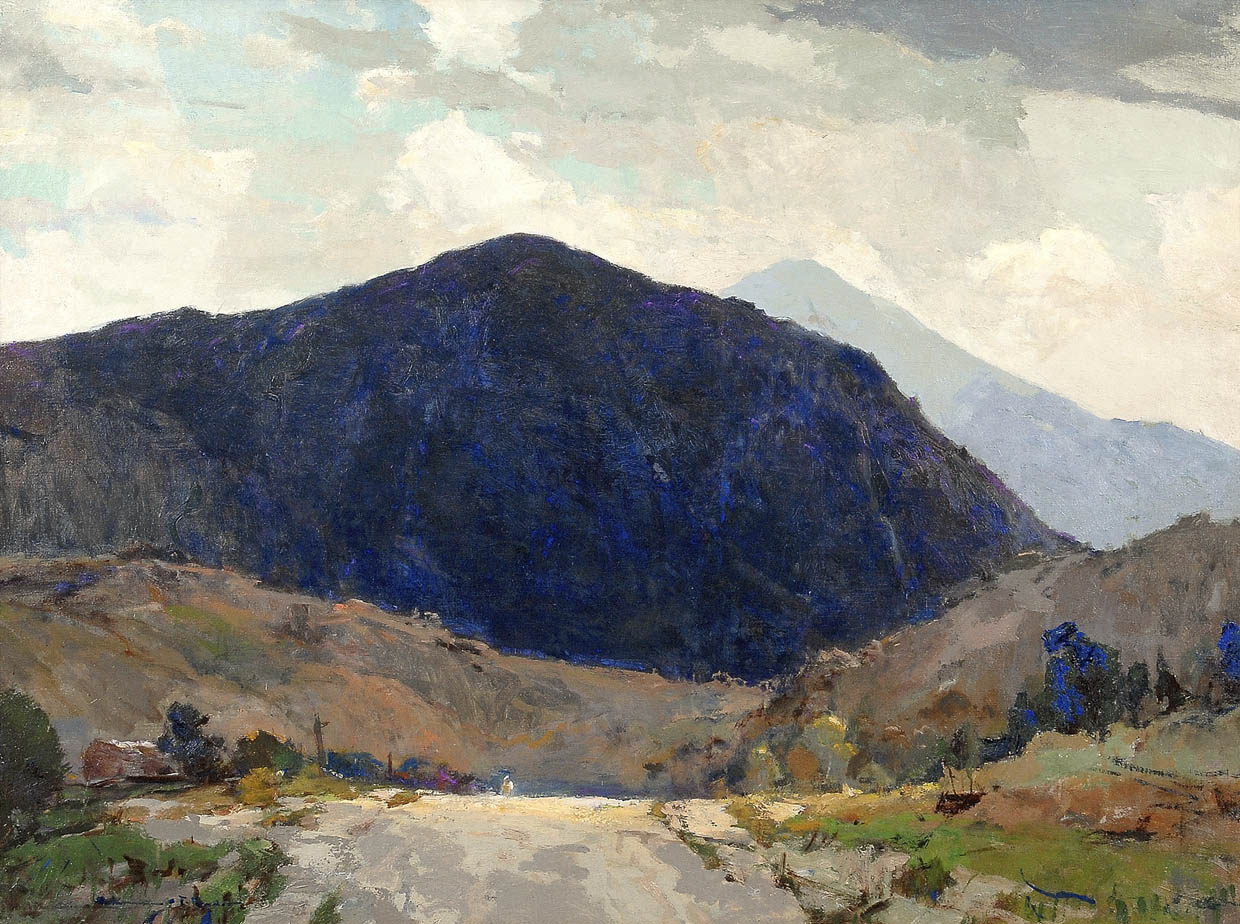
Gateway to North Carolina

Ryder died in Wilton in 1949. His work is in the collections of numerous American museums, including the Metropolitan Museum of Art (New York), the Corcoran Gallery of Art and the National Portrait Gallery (Washington, D.C.), the Art Institute of Chicago (Illinois), and the Baltimore Museum of Art (Maryland).
