= Charleston Renaissance =

Period between World Wars I and II

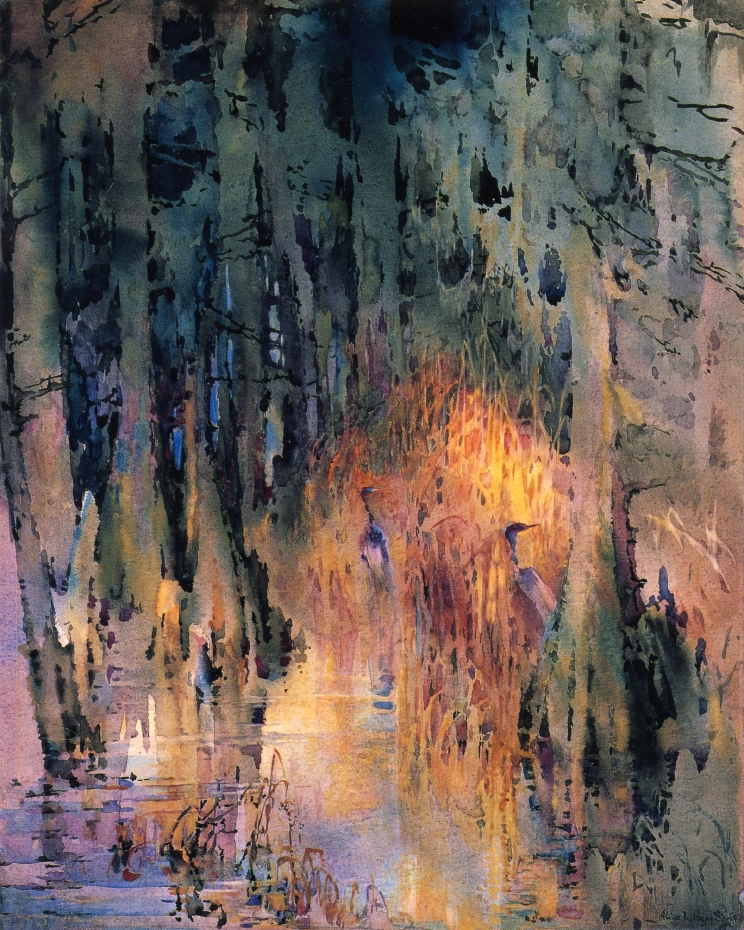
Alice Ravenel Huger Smith, Bayou Scene , watercolor, 1920.

The Charleston Renaissance is a period between World Wars I and II in which the city of Charleston, South Carolina, experienced a boom in the arts as artists, writers, architects, and historical preservationists came together to improve and represent their city. The Charleston Renaissance was related to the larger interwar artistic movement known as the Southern Renaissance and is credited with helping to spur the city's tourist industry.

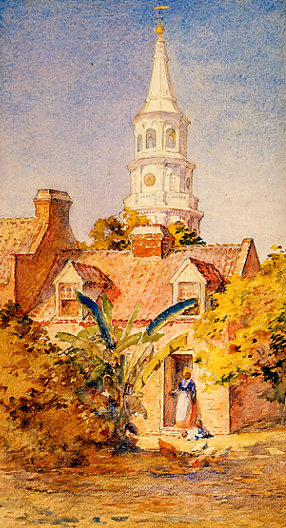
Alice Ravenel Huger Smith, The Rector's Kitchen and View of St. Michael's, watercolor, 1910–15.

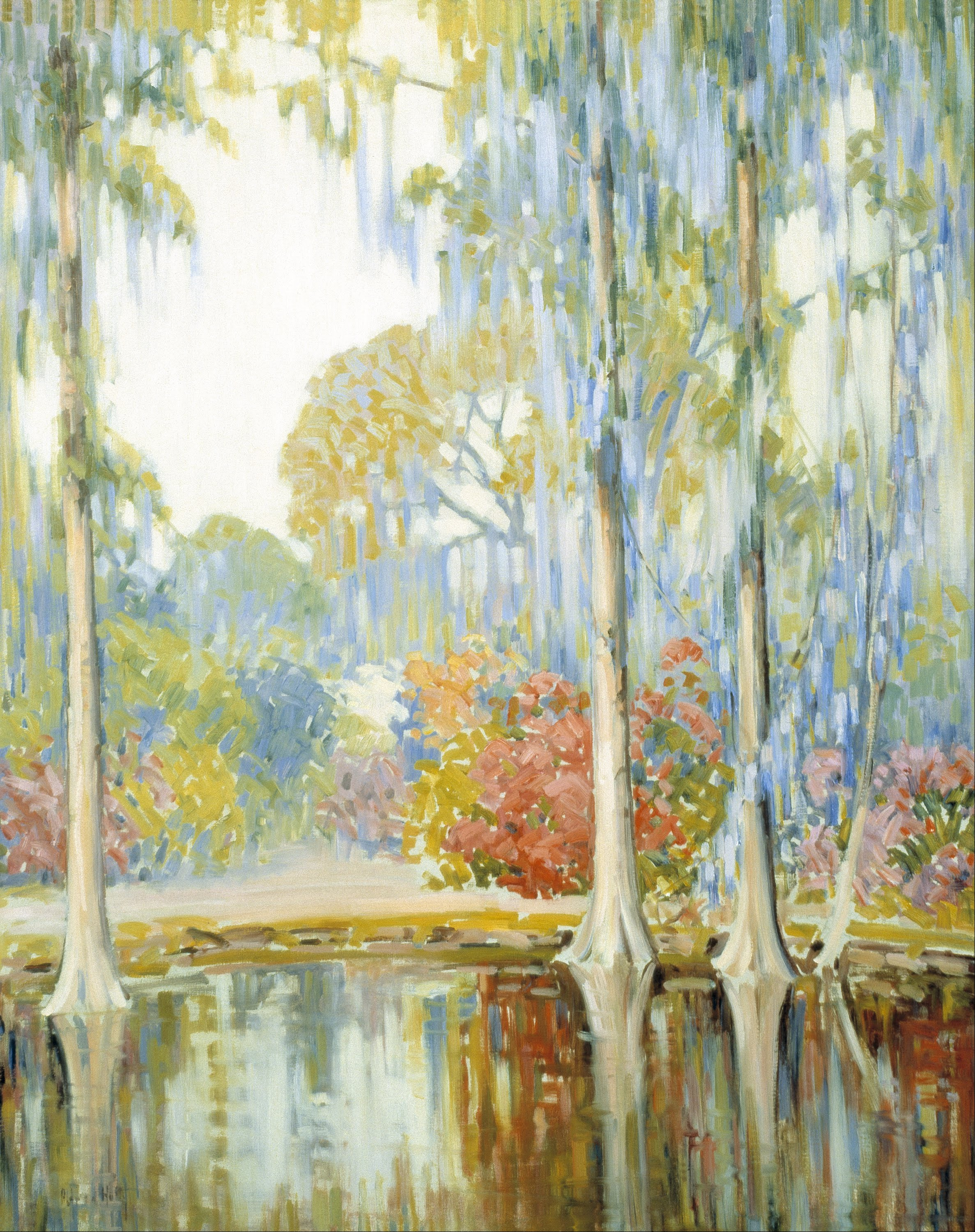
Alfred Hutty, Magnolia Gardens, oil on canvas, 1920.

== History ==
In the Antebellum era, Charleston was one of the ten largest cities in America. The Civil War destroyed the city's prosperity, and the economic after-effects lingered through the Reconstruction era into the early 20th century. Beginning around World War I, however, the city experienced a renaissance in the arts as the local art community worked on bettering their city and representing it in various media. The Charleston Renaissance contributed to the rise of such art institutions as the Gibbes Museum of Art (which grew out of the Carolina Art Association's gallery) and the Poetry Society of South Carolina. It lasted through the Great Depression until World War II.

Writers associated with the movement include DuBose Heyward (author of the book on which the opera Porgy and Bess was based), John Bennett (author of the first scholarly work on the Gullah language), novelists Josephine Pinckney and Julia Peterkin, poets Hervey Allen, Helen von Kolnitz Hyer, and Beatrice Ravenel, and playwright Dorothy Heyward.

On the institutional front, Laura Bragg became the first woman to run a publicly funded art museum in America when she became the director of the Charleston Museum.

The Charleston Renaissance is most closely associated with the visual arts, however. The four leading artists of the movement are Alfred Hutty, Alice Ravenel Huger Smith, Anna Heyward Taylor, and Elizabeth O'Neill Verner. Of these, Smith and Verner were Charleston natives, while Taylor hailed from elsewhere in the state and Hutty came from New York. Other visual artists considered part of the movement include Edwin Harleston, Anne Taylor Nash, and William Posey Silva. Visiting artists such as Ellen Day Hale, Gabrielle D. Clements, Edward Hopper, and Childe Hassam are sometimes included in the group.

The Charleston Renaissance artists' oil paintings, watercolors, and prints documented Charleston and the South Carolina Lowcountry around the city through sometimes romanticized landscapes, architectural studies, and scenes of daily life past and present. The artists specialized in prints, including woodblocks and etchings, which sold more readily to tourists and other visitors than paintings did and which helped to spread the imagery of the movement throughout the country. Local artists collectively bought a press and—influenced in part by visiting artists Hale and Clements—formed the Charleston Etchers' Club to promote printmaking as a medium.

Smith, Verner, and others also banded together to champion preservation of the city's remaining historic buildings. The Preservation Society of Charleston was formed in the 1920s, and in 1928 the city's first "historic house" museum was founded. In 1931, the city gained its first historic district, which placed zoning restrictions on all historic structures in the lower part of the Charleston peninsula.

In 1998, the Greenville County Museum of Art mounted a large exhibition, "The Charleston Renaissance," which then traveled to museums in Columbia, Charleston, and Augusta (Georgia) over the next three years.

== People associated with the Charleston Renaissance ==
=== Visual arts ===
- Edwin Harleston
- Alfred Hutty
- Anne Taylor Nash
- William Posey Silva
- Alice Ravenel Huger Smith
- Anna Heyward Taylor
- Elizabeth O'Neill Verner

=== Writers ===
- Hervey Allen
- John Bennett
- Dorothy Heyward
- DuBose Heyward
- Helen von Kolnitz Hyer
- Julia Peterkin
- Josephine Pinckney
- Beatrice Ravenel
