= Elizabeth O'Neill Verner House =

Pre-Revolutionary house in South Carolina

Coordinates: 32.775040°N 79.929258°W

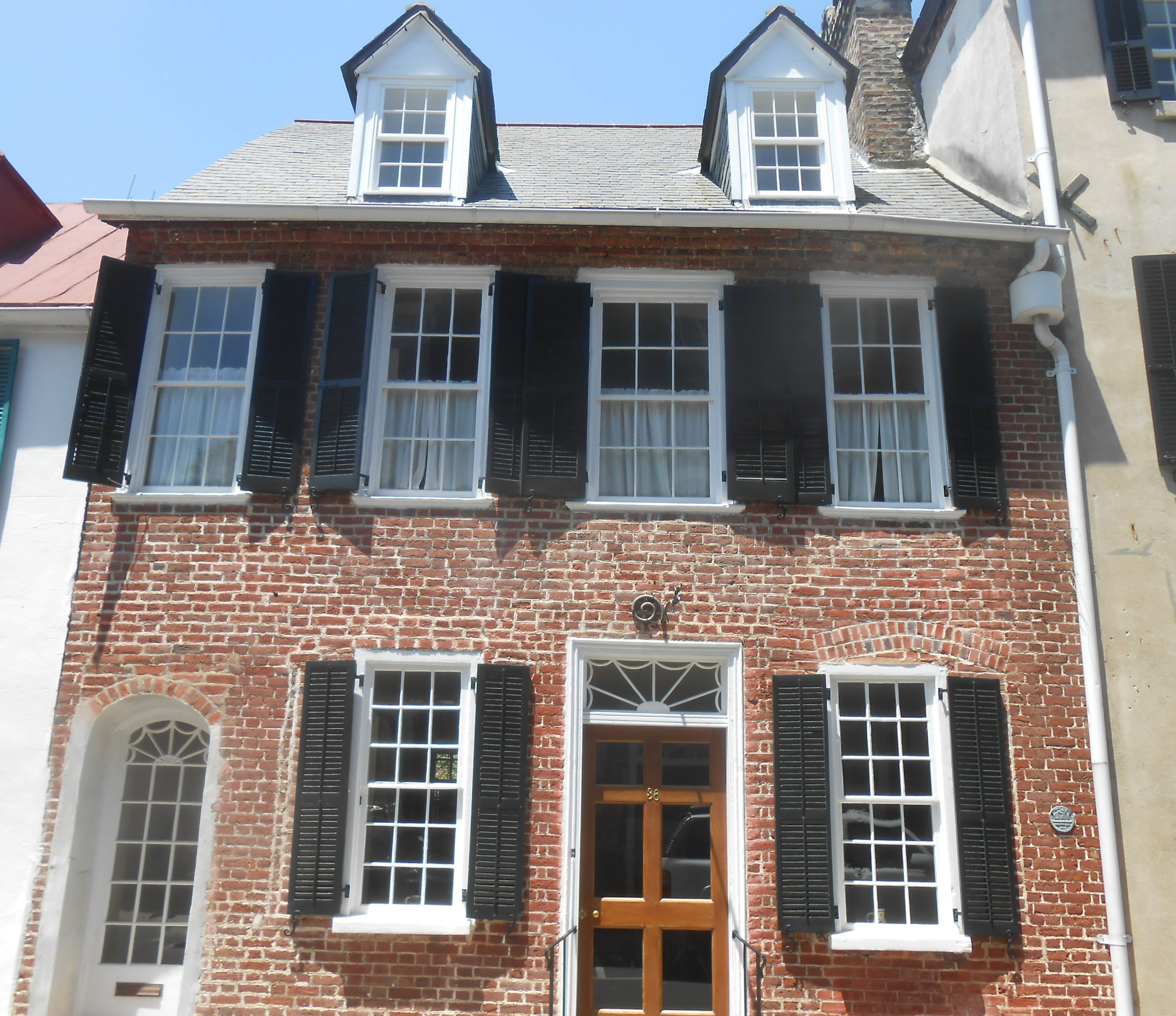
The Elizabeth O'Neill Verner House is at 38 Tradd Street, Charleston, South Carolina.

The Elizabeth O'Neill Verner House is a pre-Revolutionary house in Charleston, South Carolina, that was built by a Huguenot barrel maker. The house was built in 1718. Later, the house was used as a "sweet shoppe." In the 20th century, American artist Elizabeth O'Neill Verner kept her art studio in the house.
