= Ann Bonfoey Taylor =

American fashion designer (1910–2007)

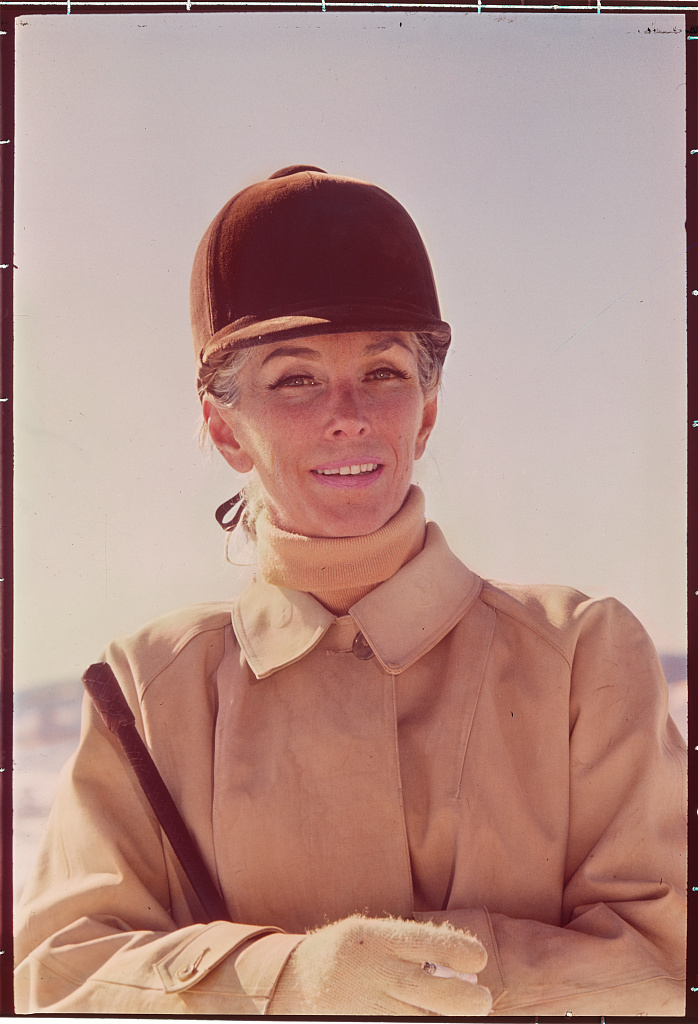
Taylor modeling hunting attire in Vogue, May 1967

Ann Bonfoey Taylor (3 December 1910 – 28 October 2007) was an American aviator, flight instructor and fashion designer.

== Early life ==
Taylor was born in Ardmore, Pennsylvania, U.S. to a wealthy family which owned a pharmaceutical and dye manufacturing company, Putnam Dyes. She grew up in Quincy, Illinois, with three brothers. When she was six years old her father introduced her to flying in an open cockpit biplane, and when she was 12 he hired an instructor to teach her to fly.

== Adult life ==
When Taylor was 18, in 1928, she moved to Vermont, where she took up snow skiing and earned a place on the 1940 Olympic Ski team for the United States. Unfortunately the games were cancelled due to the outbreak of World War II. She also played competitive tennis and competed at Wimbledon, England.

In 1941, Taylor enrolled at the University of Vermont as an aviation student and earned her commercial flight instructor's license, and after the U.S. became involved in the war she worked as a trainer for U.S. Army and Navy pilots. Following the war Taylor started a business designing and making ski clothes. Although it was initially a cottage industry operating in her own home, she used her connections in fashion magazines and photography and had her designs featured in Harper's Bazaar magazine, leading to a significant increase in orders. She soon opened a shop in Stowe, Vermont, and the New York City stores Bergdorf Goodman and Lord & Taylor carried her line. Taylor closed the business after a few years when she moved to Texas at her second husband's request.

=== Personal life ===
Taylor was married twice: firstly in 1928, aged 18, to James Cooke, with whom she had two children; and secondly in 1947 to Vernon Taylor, with whom she had four children.

=== Legacy ===
In 2008, Taylor's widower gifted her collection of haute couture day and evening wear to the Phoenix Art Museum and in 2013 the Georgia Museum of Art staged an exhibition of over 200 pieces. The exhibition included pieces from leading designers such as Mariano Fortuny, Charles James, James Galanos, Cristóbal Balenciaga, Hubert de Givenchy and Madame Grès. It also included some of Taylor’s own skiwear designs and sportswear as well as accessories by Hermés, Louis Vuitton, Gucci and Henry Maxwell.
