= Alfred Hutty =

American painter

Alfred Heber Hutty (September 15, 1877 – June 27, 1954) was a 20th-century American artist who is considered one of the leading figures of the Charleston Renaissance. His oeuvre ranges from impressionist landscape paintings to detailed drawings and prints of life in the South Carolina Lowcountry. He was active in local arts organizations, helping to found both an art school and an etchers' club.

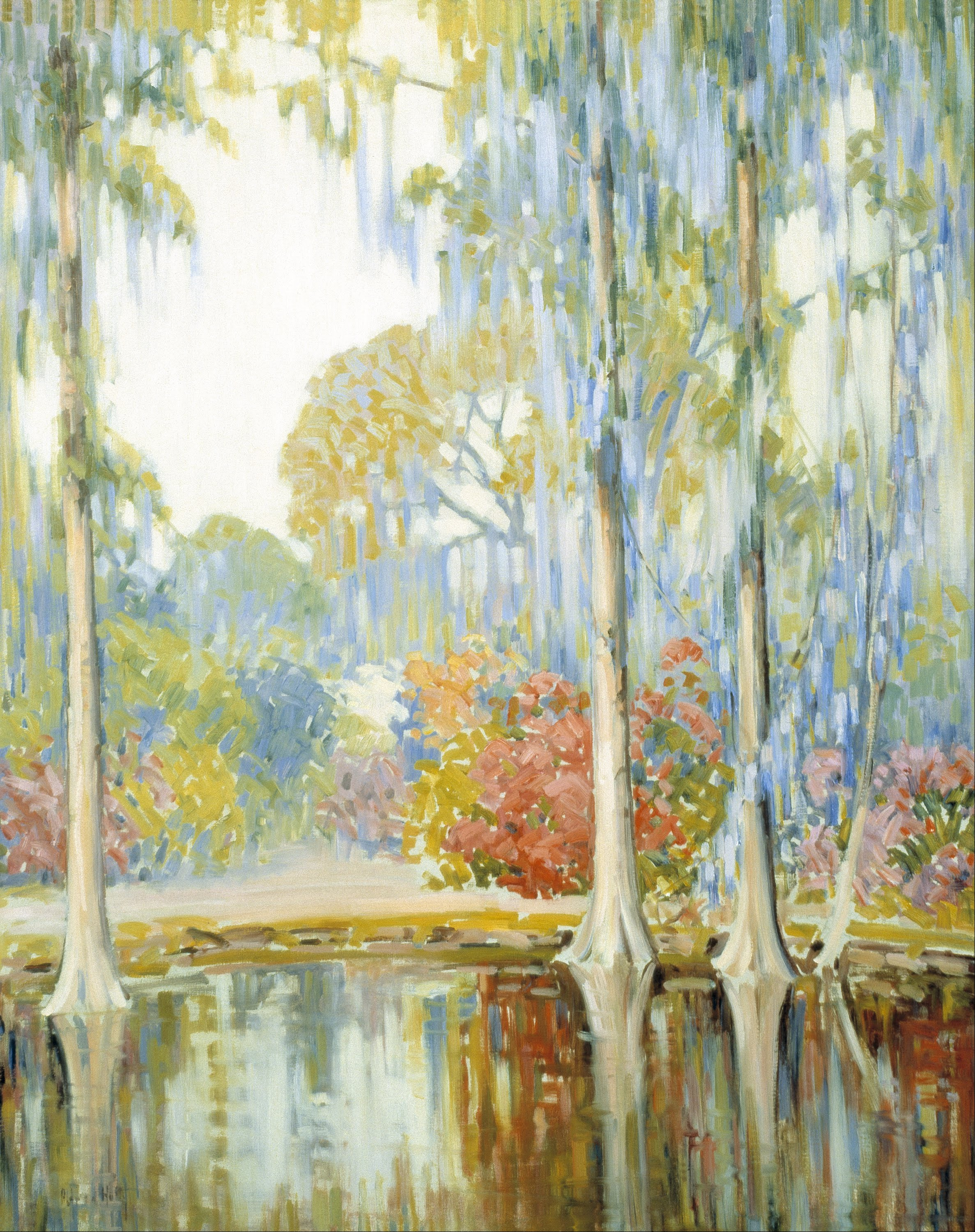
Alfred Hutty, Magnolia Gardens, oil on canvas, 1920.

== Early years ==
Alfred Heber Hutty was born on September 15, 1877, in Grand Haven, Michigan. His artistic talent won him a scholarship when he was just 15 to study stained glass design at the Kansas City School of Fine Arts. Because of his family's financial situation, he turned down the scholarship and instead went to work in a stained glass factory in Kansas City.

He married Bessie Burris Crafton, with whom he had a child, and they moved to St. Louis, where he met the painter L. Birge Harrison. In 1907, he went to Woodstock, New York, to study painting with Harrison. To earn money, he took a job with Tiffany Studios in New York City, staying until the outbreak of World War I. While in New York, he also studied with George Bridgman (life drawing) and Frank Vincent DuMond (painting).

Hutty served in World War I as an artist working on camouflage of ships. Afterwards, in 1919, he visited Charleston, South Carolina. There is an oft-repeated story that he immediately cabled his wife: "Come quickly. Have found heaven." For the remainder of his life, he split his time between Charleston, where he lived during the winters, and Woodstock, where he had a summer house named Broadview on an old farm property. He is considered a founder of the Woodstock Art Colony.

== Art career ==
Hutty first established himself in Woodstock as a painter of evocative, impressionist landscapes in oil and watercolor. After moving to Charleston, he took up etching and drypoint and became nationally known for his quiet, detailed prints of local landscapes (especially trees), street scenes, historical buildings, farm life, and African-American residents. His prints of the South Carolina Lowcountry won a number of awards and medals, including the Scarab Club Medal of the Detroit Institute of Art and the Logan Prize of the Art Institute of Chicago. Along with Alice Ravenel Huger Smith, Anna Heyward Taylor, and Elizabeth O'Neill Verner, he is today considered one of the leading artists of the Charleston Renaissance.

Hutty exhibited his work nationally at venues such as the Art Institute of Chicago, the National Academy of Design, and the American Watercolor Society. His work is held by the Gibbes Museum of Art (which has the single largest collection of his work), the Metropolitan Museum of Art, the Los Angeles County Museum of Art, the Greenville (SC) County Museum of Art, the Cleveland Museum of Art, the South Carolina State Museum in Columbia, and other museums and libraries. He also painted some murals in Charleston and took part in local historical preservation efforts.

Hutty taught from 1920 to 1924 at the Carolina Art Association (whose gallery would later become the Gibbes Museum of Art). He became the first professional director of the then-new Carolina Art Association Art School.

Hutty was active in arts organizations. In 1923, he helped to found the Charleston Etchers' Club. He was also a member of the Society of American Etchers, the Allied Artists of America, the National Arts Club, the American Watercolor Society, and other arts organizations. He was the first American artist ever elected to the British Society of the Graphic Arts.

Hutty died in Woodstock on June 27, 1954.
