= Anne Taylor Nash =

American painter

Anne Taylor Nash (1884–1968) was an American painter, largely of portraits.

Born Anne Mauger Taylor in Pittsboro, North Carolina, Nash did not begin painting until she was forty, being inspired to do so by her friend Elizabeth O'Neill Verner. She studied art at the Gibbes Museum of Art, the Pennsylvania Academy of the Fine Arts, the École des Beaux-Arts in Fontainbleau, and the New England School of Fine Arts, and she was a pupil of Verner's in 1924. She was an active member of the Southern States Art League and the Carolina Art Association. Nash married Edmund Strudwick Nash, a descendant of Francis Nash and a relative of Ogden Nash, in 1906, and shortly thereafter moved to Charleston, South Carolina. Her portraits were exhibited at the Gibbes in 1933. In 1937 the family moved to Savannah, Georgia, where she remained active for the rest of her life, exhibiting at the Telfair Museum of Art with the Savannah Art Club at least ten times between 1931 and 1958. Her work was once again the subject of a retrospective at the Telfair in 2015.
