= Ann Taylor Allen =

Professor of German history

Ann Taylor Allen is a professor of German history at the University of Louisville. Allen is the author of five books and more than twenty articles/reviews in peer-reviewed journals. She has a BA from Bryn Mawr College (1965, Magna cum laude), studied at the University of Hamburg, Germany with a Fulbright Fellowship, received an MA in 1967 from Harvard University and earned a PhD from Columbia University in 1974.

== Books ==
- Satire and Society in Wilhelmine Germany: Simplicissimus and Kladderadatsch, 1890–1914. Lexington, Kentucky (University Press of Kentucky), 1984.
- Feminism and Motherhood in Germany, 1800–1914. New Brunswick, NJ (Rutgers University Press), 1991.
- Feminismus und Mütterlichkeit in Deutschland, 1800–1914. Weinheim (Beltz Verlag), 2000. German version of Feminism and Motherhood, translated by Regine Othmer.
- Feminism and Motherhood in Western Europe, 1890–1970: The Maternal Dilemma. New York (Palgrave-Macmillan), 2005.
- Women in Twentieth-Century Europe, Houndmills, Basingstoke (Palgrave-Macmillan), 2008.
- The Transatlantic Kindergarten: Education and Women's Movements in Germany and the United States. New York (Oxford University Press), 2017
