= Alice Ravenel Huger Smith =

American painter

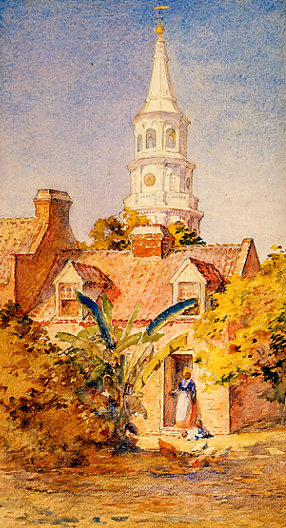
The rector's kitchen, watercolor, 1910s.

Alice Ravenel Huger Smith (July 14, 1876 – February 3, 1958) was an American painter and printmaker. She was one of the leading figures in the so-called Charleston Renaissance, along with Elizabeth O'Neill Verner, Alfred Hutty, and Anna Heyward Taylor.

== Family and education ==
Smith was a native of Charleston, South Carolina, and had been born into one of the most prominent families of the city. Her parents were Caroline (Ravenel) Smith and Daniel Elliott Smith. Through her great-great-grandfather Daniel Ravenel (1762-1807), she was a distant cousin of the writers Harriott Horry Ravenel, Beatrice Ravenel, and Beatrice St. Julien Ravenel.

Smith received some basic training, early in her career, at the Carolina Art Association, but otherwise remained largely self-taught throughout her life. She traveled rarely, only traveling once to Canada, and hated change; she disliked the automobile intensely, and preferred to walk.

== Art career ==
Smith began her career as a portraitist, copying old family images and painting friends and relations; during this time she also painted fans and dance cards. In 1910 she began experimenting with woodblock printing and etching, seeing limited success in the latter field but much in the former due to her sense of color; even so she would teach etching during the 1920s, with Elizabeth O'Neill Verner becoming a notable pupil.

After experimenting with oil paints and printmaking, Smith eventually settled on watercolor as her preferred medium, in which she would work for the rest of her life. Smith was also deeply involved in Charleston's artistic community; a founding member of the Charleston Etcher's Club and the Southern States Art League, she was also involved in the Historic Charleston Foundation, Carolina Art Association, and the Music and Poetry Society.

Smith's work was influenced by ukiyo-e and other Japanese styles, which she would have known from prints in the collection of her cousin, Harvard professor Motte Alston Read; this aesthetic was reinforced by exposure to the art of Helen Hyde, with whose work Smith became acquainted when Hyde visited Charleston. Another visitor who made an impact on her artistic development was Birge Harrison, whom she came to know when he spent an extended period of time in the city in 1908.

Unlike many of her fellow South Carolina artists, Smith preferred the rural landscape of the Carolina Lowcountry to urban scenes of Charleston when searching for subjects. She was also interested in recording vanishing ways of life; her best-known work is the series of twenty-nine watercolors she painted to illustrate A Carolina Rice Plantation of the Fifties by Herbert Sass. Many of her mature watercolors depict scenes from rural salt marshes. Early in her career she also illustrated a volume by her father, D. E. H. Smith, a historian; titled The Dwelling Houses of Charleston, it was published in 1917 and sparked the historical preservation movement in the city. She illustrated another of her father's books as well, and contributed illustrations to several other volumes about South Carolina throughout her career.

Smith exhibited widely throughout her career, both in South Carolina and elsewhere in the United States. Some of her work, including the Sass watercolors, is owned by the Carolina Art Association and may be seen at the Gibbes Museum of Art, which conserved the pieces with the assistance of the Harvard University Art Museums. Several of her watercolors are held by the Johnson Collection of Southern Art. A collection of pastels depicting the interior of the Joseph Manigault House is owned by the Charleston Museum.

Other museums with her work include the Brooklyn Museum, the High Museum of Art, the Two Red Roses Foundation, the Ogden Museum of Southern Art, and the M. H. de Young Museum. One of her watercolors appeared on Antiques Roadshow in 2013, where it was appraised at $85,000.

Smith's papers are held by the South Carolina Historical Society.

Her artwork is featured as the artwork of Kya the Marsh Girl in the motion picture adaptation of Delia Owens' best selling novel "Where The Crawdads Sing."
