= William Posey Silva =

American painter

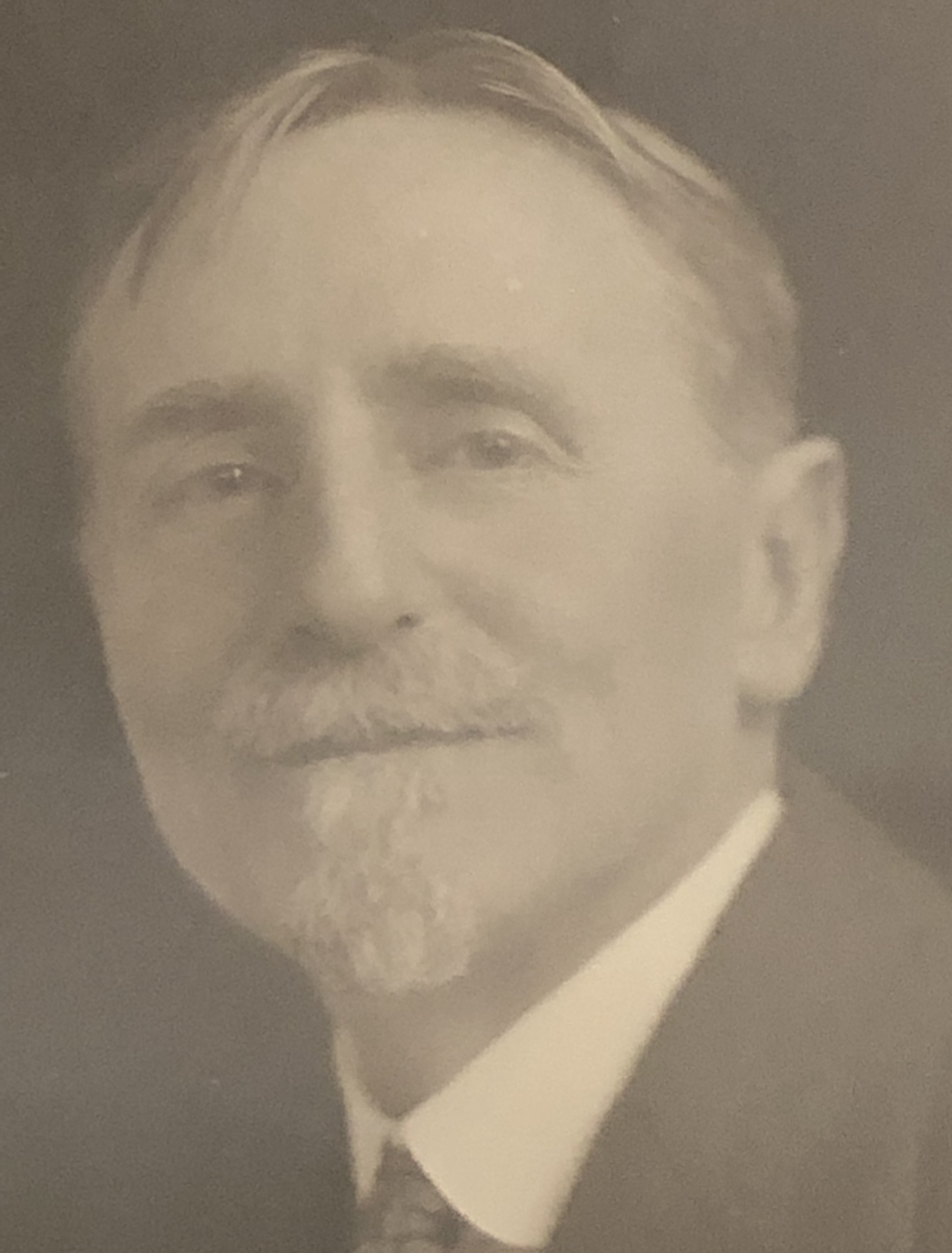
William Posey Silva (date unknown)

William Posey Silva (1859–1948) was an early 20th century American painter noted for atmospheric landscapes painted in a lyrical impressionist style. His work is associated with the Charleston Renaissance and with the art colony in Carmel, California, where he lived for thirty-six years.

== Biography ==
William Posey Silva was born in Savannah, Georgia, on October 23, 1859. His paternal grandfather was a Portuguese immigrant from the Azores. He graduated from Chatham Academy in 1875 and went on to study engineering for a short time at the University of Virginia. While still a young man, he inherited his father's prosperous china and hardware business, which he ran until he sold the business in 1906. He married Caroline Walker Beecher and had a son, Abbott, who joined the Forest Service.

Silva had been interested in painting for many years, and some of his earliest canvases are of coastal Georgia and the Tennessee mountains. Between 1900 and 1905, he spent the summers studying composition with Arthur Wesley Dow in Ipswich, Massachusetts. In 1907, he went to Paris to study art at the Académie Julian under Jean-Paul Laurens and Henri Royer, as well as with Chauncey Foster Ryder at Étaples; he painted in Venice and Spain. In 1908 three of his works were accepted at Paris’ Salon d’Automne; two were entitled Pines of Picardy and Quiet Village. His first solo exhibition was at the fashionable Georges Petit Gallery in 1909. This was followed by other European shows.

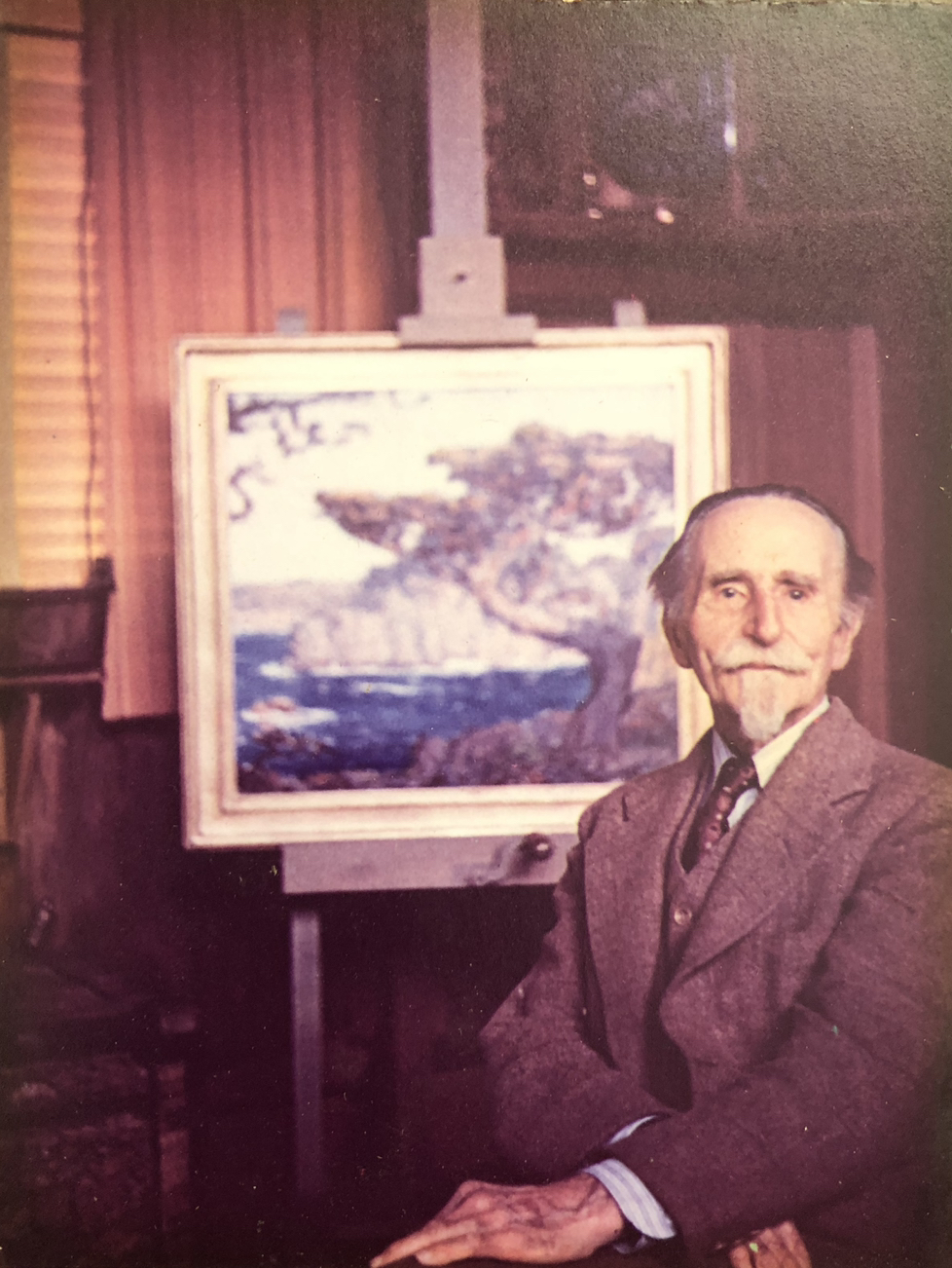
William Posey Silva posing with one of his paintings of Point Lobos near Carmel, CA

When he returned to the United States in 1910, he first set up studios in Chattanooga, Tennessee, and Washington, D.C. (where he wintered), and spent much of the next three years traveling around the South, searching out painting sites and exhibiting his work. He painting trips took him to New Orleans, Louisiana; Charleston, South Carolina; and the Mississippi Gulf Coast. During this period he began to develop a reputation for "ethereal garden landscapes" painted in a style of lyrical impressionism. Just outside of Charleston the Magnolia Plantation and Gardens provided the inspiration for his series of paintings entitled Garden of Dreams. In 1910, he had a one-person show at the Gibbes Art Gallery (now the Gibbes Museum) in Charleston, one of the key venues associated with the Charleston Renaissance. In Washington D.C. he joined the local Society of Artists and exhibited at the Corcoran Art Gallery (1910), Veerhoff Gallery (1911), and Sloan Galleries (1913). He became an exhibiting member of the Salmagundi Club of New York, Pennsylvania Academy of Fine Arts, and the Water Color Clubs on Chicago and New York.

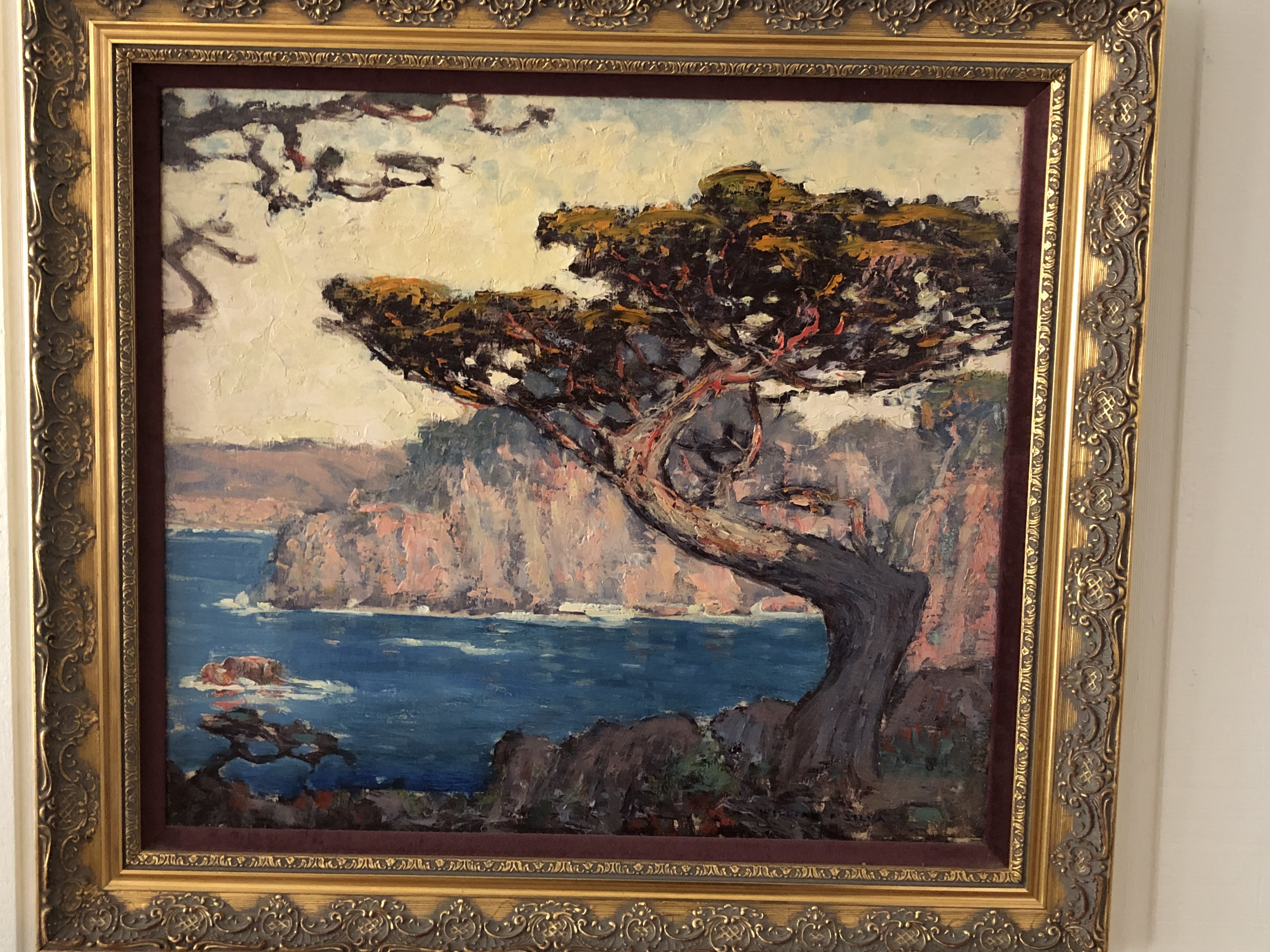
Award-winning palette knife painting of Point Lobos near Carmel, CA by William Posey Silva

In 1911 Silva purchased property in Carmel-by-the-Sea, California, and established a summer studio; a year later he and his family occupied a home there on Carmelo Street. He established the Carmelita Art Gallery. Although he did not exhibit in 1915 at San Francisco's Panama–Pacific International Exposition, he did win silver medals at the Panama–California Exposition in San Diego. His paintings were frequently seen on the Pacific, especially in southern California, with group and solo exhibits between 1914 and the 1930s at the Los Angeles Museum, Blanchard Gallery, Friday Morning Club of Los Angeles, Kanst Gallery, Ebell Club of Los Angeles, Cannell & Chaffin Galleries, and Pasadena Art Institute. He was an exhibiting member of the Carmel Arts & Crafts Club from 1913 to 1923 and habitually exhibited at the Carmel Art Association between 1939 and 1947. He and his wife were socially active in Carmel where he helped paint sets for the Forest Theatre, served on the Fire Commission, took legal action to preserve the town's old-growth trees, joined the Carmel Pistol Club, became a vocal proponent of Prohibition, and attempted to ban the local chapter of the John Reed Club.

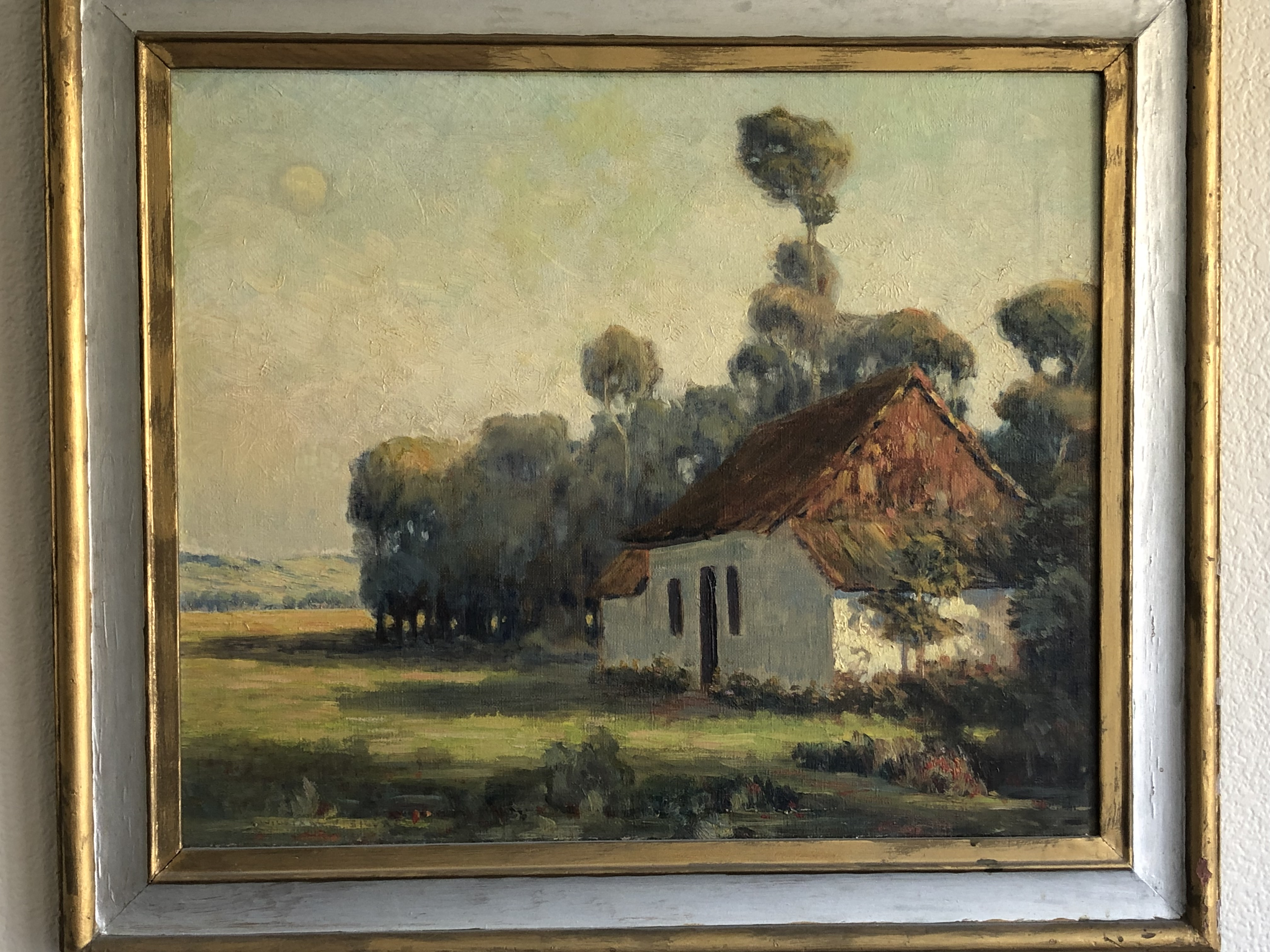
Painting of a cottage in the French countryside where William Posey lived and painted

During his California years, Silva continued to exhibit his work both internationally and nationally, returning often to the South in the 1920s to paint the Carolina Low Country. In 1915 he won a gold medal at the Mississippi Art Association and had one-man exhibits in 1916 at the Mississippi Art Institute, Minneapolis Art Society, and Milwaukee Art Institute. A year later the Southern States Art League, an organization that he co-established, sponsored his exhibit at the Telfair Academy in Savannah. In 1922 Silva and his wife returned to France where he exhibited four paintings at Paris’ Salon de la Société des Artistes Français and received an honorable mention. He was a frequent contributor between 1926 and 1942 to the prestigious National Art Exhibition in Springville, Utah, where he won medals in 1927 and 1929.

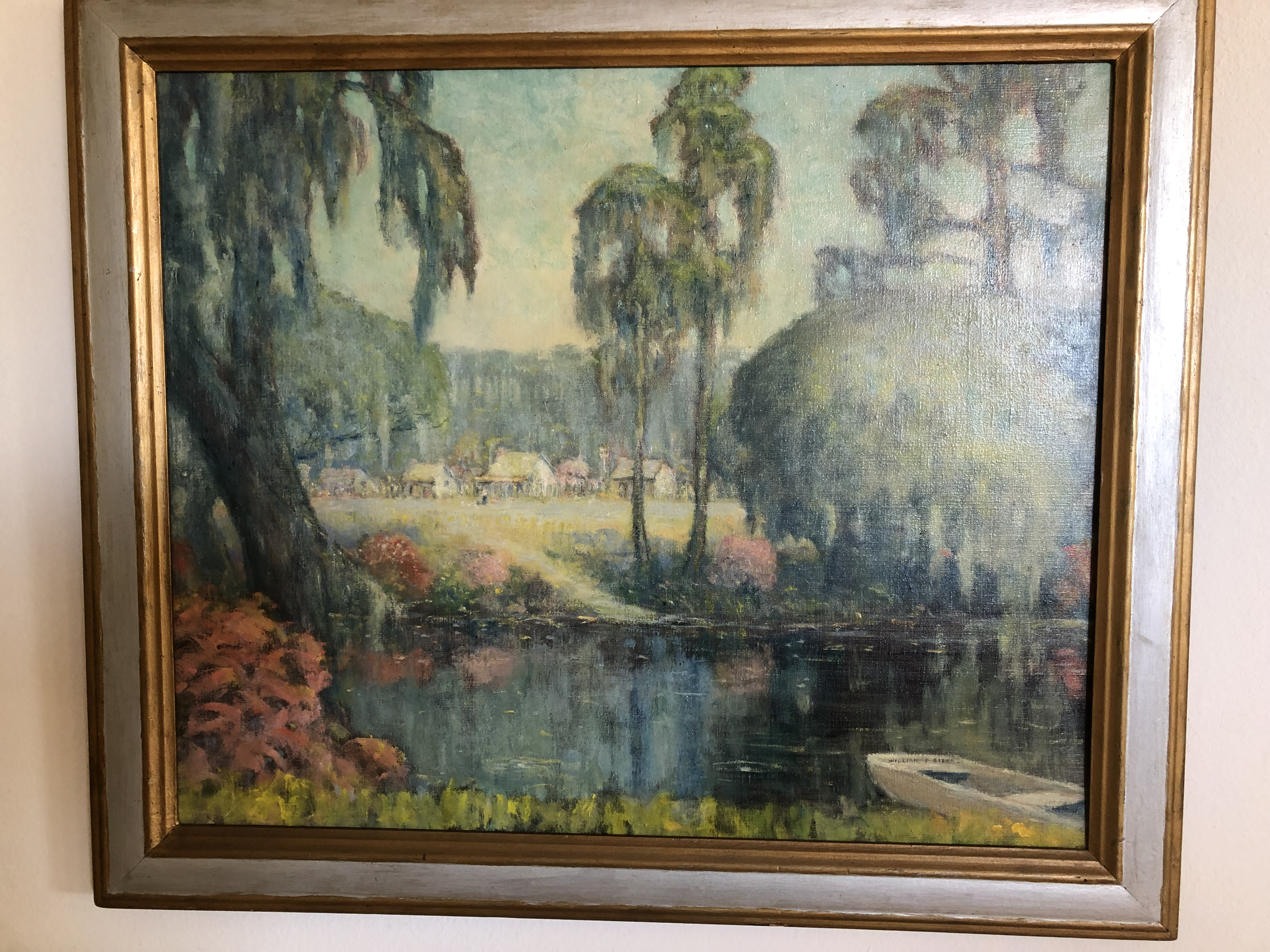
Painting of Runnymede Plantation in Charleston, SC by William Posey Silva

Silva's paintings won numerous awards, including a silver medal at the Appalachian Exposition in Knoxville, Tennessee (1910) and second prize at the California State Fair (1920). He took part in the Golden Gate International Exposition (1939). His work is held in the collections of the Houston Museum (Texas), the Luxembourg Gallery (France), Ross Memorial Museum (Canada), the New Orleans Museum of Art, the Ogden Museum of Southern Art (New Orleans), the Johnson Collection (South Carolina), and the Gibbes Museum, among others. American art historian William H. Gerdts considers him the "finest artist at the turn of the century."

William Silva died in Carmel on February 10, 1948; his ashes were sent to the family crypt in Savannah. For several years thereafter his son Abbott sold his father's paintings at the Carmelita Art Gallery. However, his grandson, William H. Silva, retained a sizable collections of his works which remain in the family to this day.
