= Elizabeth O'Neill Verner =

American printmaker (1883–1979)

- Born: December 21, 1883; Charleston, South Carolina
- Died: April 17, 1979 (aged 95)
- Education: Pennsylvania Academy of the Fine Arts
- Occupations: Artist, author, lecturer, and preservationist

Elizabeth O'Neill Verner (December 21, 1883 – April 17, 1979) was an American artist, author, lecturer, and preservationist who was one of the leaders of the Charleston Renaissance. She has been called "the best-known woman artist of South Carolina of the twentieth century."

== Early life and education ==
Elizabeth Quale O'Neill was born Dec. 21, 1883, in Charleston, South Carolina. She first studied art with Alice Ravenel Huger Smith. In 1901, after attending a Catholic girls’ school in Columbia, South Carolina, she enrolled at the Pennsylvania Academy of Fine Arts, where she studied for two years with Thomas Anshutz.

When she left the academy, she taught art in Aiken, South Carolina, for a time. She then returned to Charleston, where she took up her art studies with Smith as well as with Gabrielle D. Clements and Ellen Day Hale. Inspired by Clements and Hale, she was a founding member of the Charleston Etchers Club and helped to found the Southern States Art League. In 1907, she married E. Pettigrew Verner, with whom she had two children.

== Art career ==
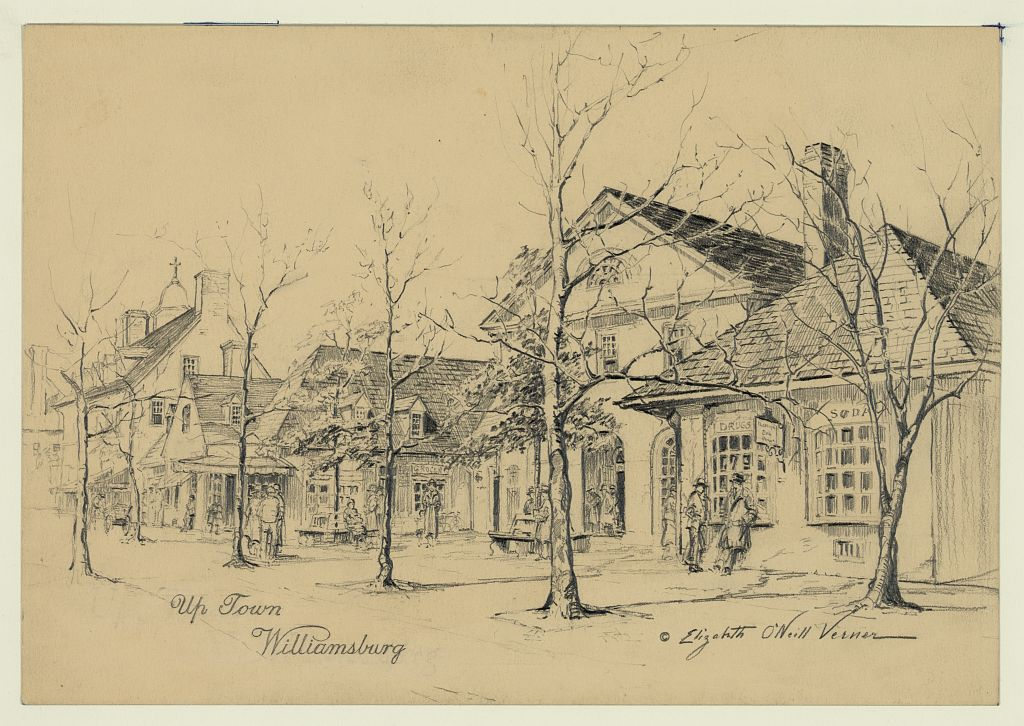
Uptown Williamsburg, 1936

Verner did not become a professional artist until after her husband's death in 1925 left her the sole means of support for her children. With advice from Smith, she worked to adapt her craft so that she could be self-supporting. One avenue she took, like some of her contemporaries, was to publish her prints in books with titles like Prints and Impressions of Charleston that could be sold to tourists. Another avenue was to seek commissions, and she came to specialize in making drawings of historic buildings in the cause of preservation. Among her clients were Williamsburg Historic District, Harvard Medical School, the United States Military Academy, Princeton University, and the University of South Carolina.

Verner made etchings, drypoints, drawings, and (after 1934) pastels of Charleston, favoring buildings, street scenes, and landscapes. Her paintings contributed to the Charleston Renaissance by drawing other artists to the area. She worked at a studio within her residence at 38 Tradd Street. She also became a portraitist known for representing African-Americans, especially the city's flower vendors. She worked occasionally as a book illustrator, illustrating DuBose Heyward's novel Porgy. Stylistically, her paintings are realism with impressionist overtones, while her etchings and drawings are crisply detailed studies.

Verner traveled extensively, visiting Japan (1937), Europe, the Caribbean, and Mexico. In London, she examined some of Rembrandt's etchings in the British Museum. While in Kyoto, Japan in 1937, she learned Japanese brushwork, and produced about 12 etchings. She inspired her friend Anne Taylor Nash to take up painting, serving as her teacher for a time. In 1946, Verner published “Other Places,” which made up 42 illustrations of places other than Charleston, accompanied by her own commentary.

She died on April 17, 1979. Her work is held by the Harvard Art Museums, the Delaware Art Museum, the Charleston Museum, the University of Michigan Museum of Art, the Smithsonian American Art Museum, and others. The South Carolina Arts Commission awards the Elizabeth O’Neill Verner Governor's Awards for the Arts in her honor.
