= Ladson =

Ladson is a surname. Notable people with the surname include:

- James Ladson (1753–1812), American politician, plantation owner, and military officer
- James H. Ladson (1795–1868), American planter, businessman, and consul
- Sarah Reeve Ladson, American socialite and arts patron
- Rick Ladson (1984–), Australian footballer

== See also ==
- Ladson family
- Ladson, South Carolina, a census-designated place
