= Ladson family =

American family with wealth originating from slavery plantations

Ladson
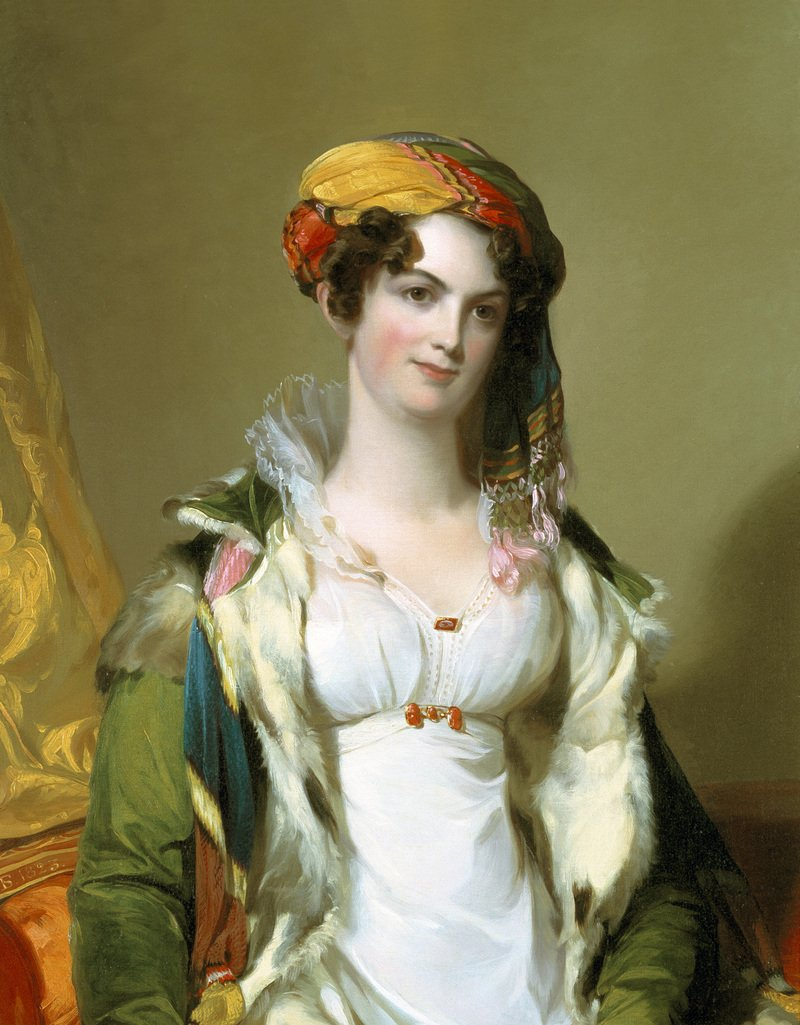
- Sarah Reeve Ladson, a daughter of lieutenant governor James Ladson and wife of art collector Robert Gilmor, Jr.
- Country: England; Province of Carolina; United States

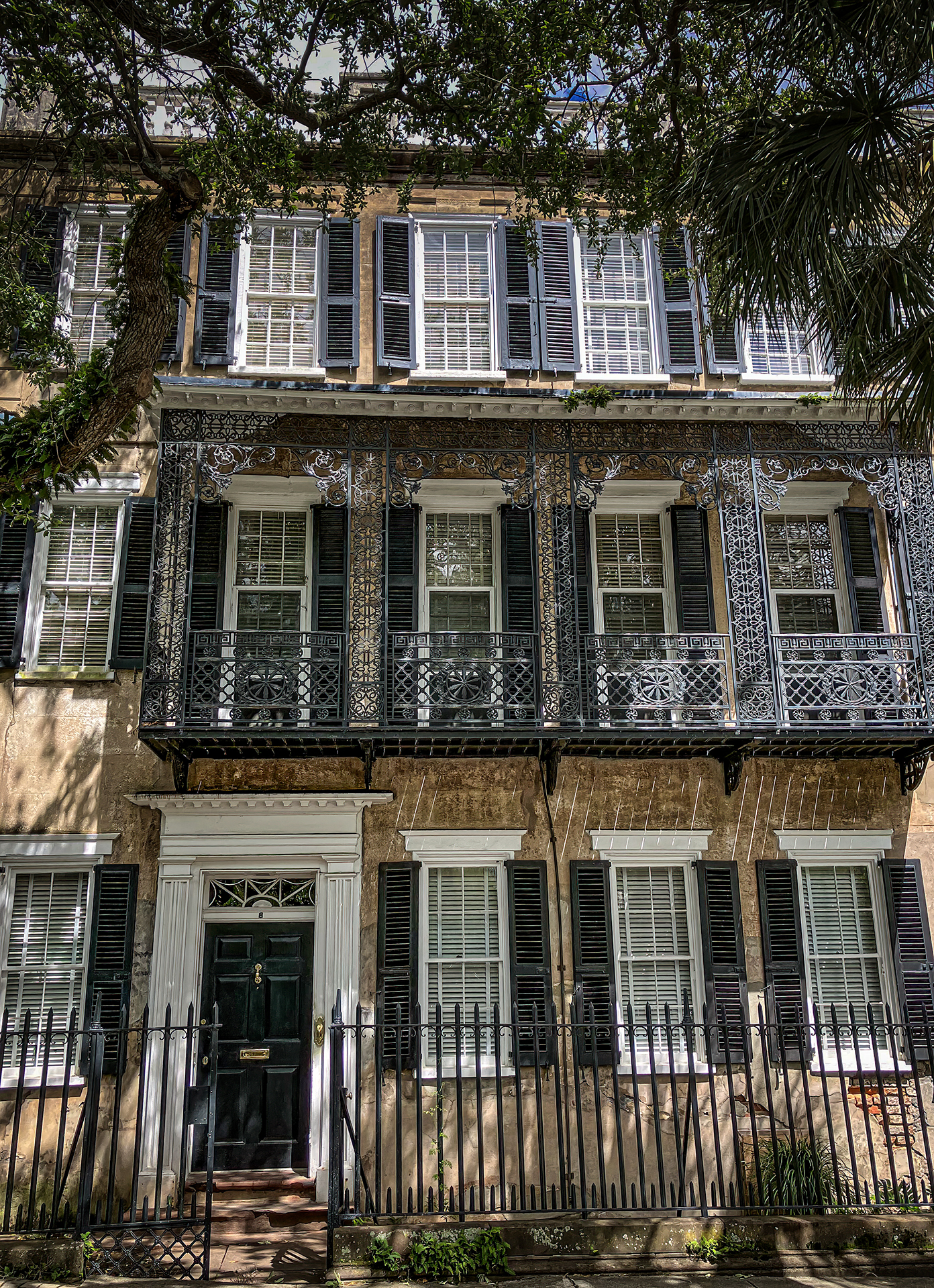
James H. Ladson House, 8 Meeting Street, Charleston, SC. April 2023.

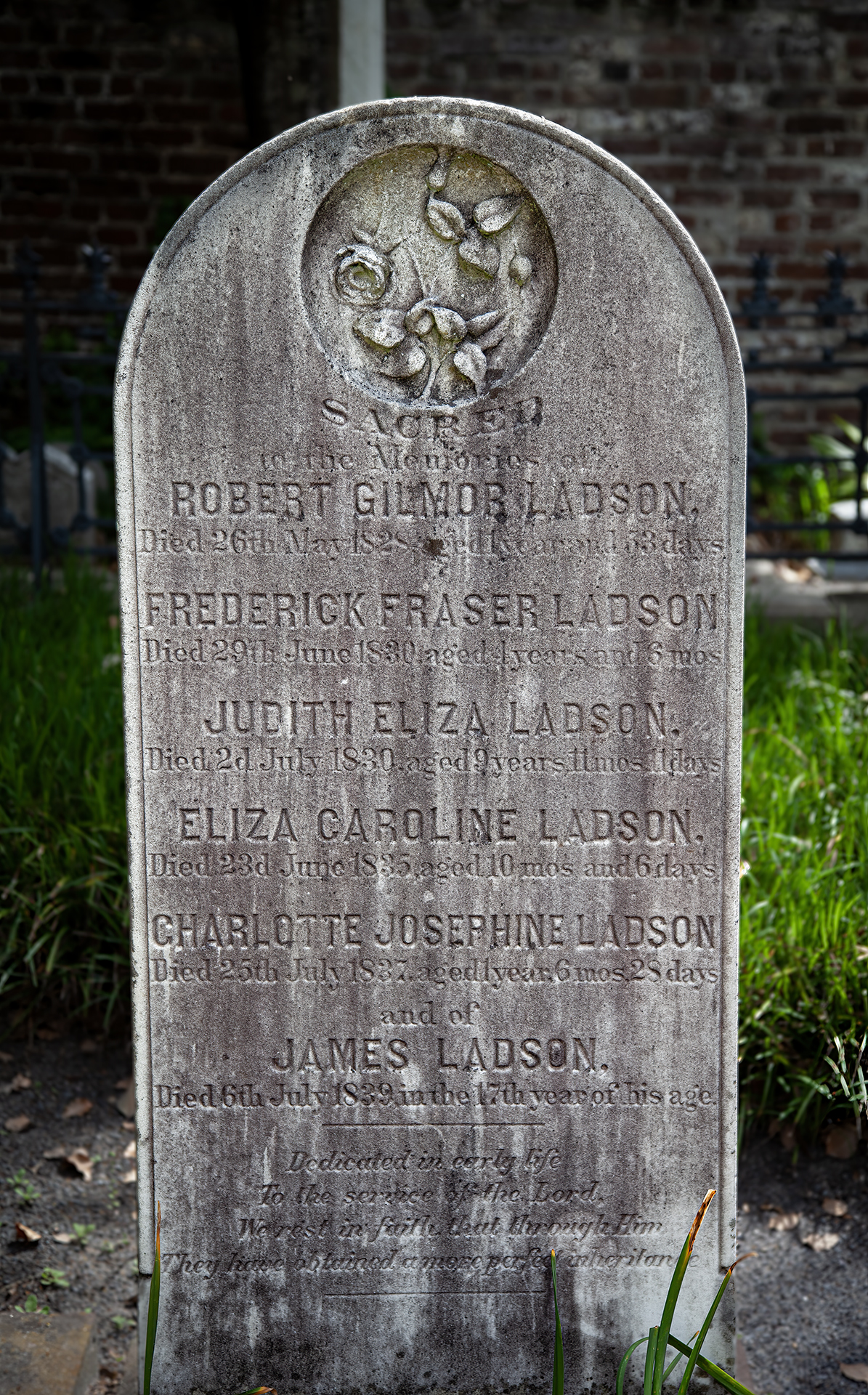
Gravestone of seven of the children of James H. Ladson, St. Michael's Church, Charleston, SC. April 2013

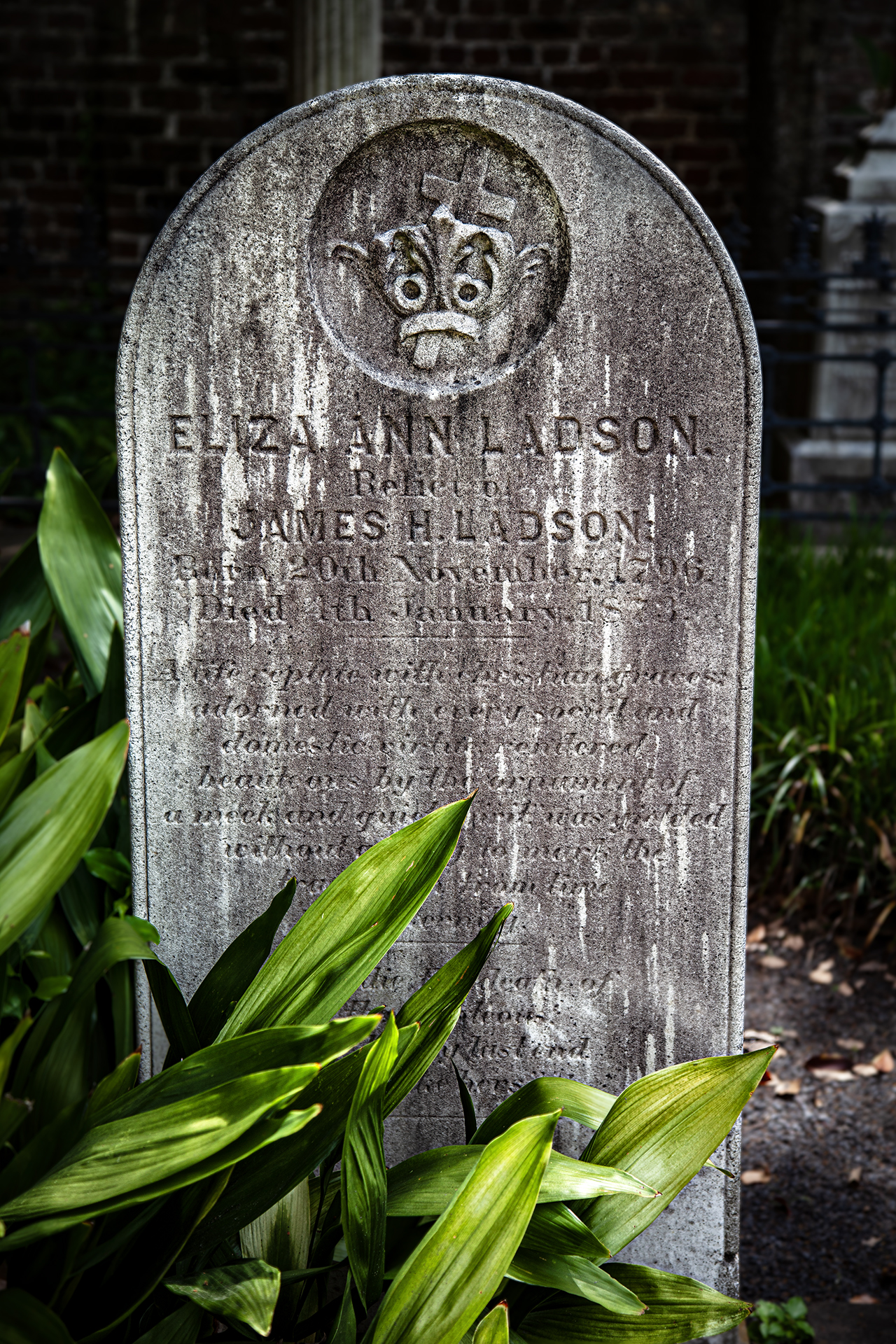
Gravestone of Eliza Ann Ladson, wife of James H. Ladson. Saint Michael's Church, Charleston, SC. April 2013

The Ladson family is an American family of English descent that belonged to the planter and merchant elite of Charleston, South Carolina from the late 17th century. The family were among the first handful of European settlers of the English colony of Carolina in the 1670s, where the family quickly became part of the American gentry. The Ladson were large plantation owners and wealthy merchants in Charleston, and owned hundreds of slaves until slavery was abolished in 1865. James Ladson served in the American Revolutionary War and became lieutenant-governor of South Carolina, while his son James H. Ladson was part of the Charleston oligarchy that was influential in launching the American Civil War. The President of the European Commission Ursula von der Leyen, who lived under the name Rose Ladson in her 20s, is a descendant of the family through her American great-grandmother.

== History ==
The family is descended from John Ladson (died 1698), a Quaker from Brigstock in England; he emigrated to Barbados and then in 1679 to the newly established Charles Town (Charleston) in Carolina where he acquired land. When he moved to Charles Town John Ladson brought with him a single black slave from Barbados, 21-year old Sara. He married Mary Stanyarne, who had been born in Barbados around 1667 to parents also from Brigstock. Described as being of undistinguished background in Barbados, John Ladson rose to become a leading member of the Royal Assembly in Carolina in the 1690s and his descendants accumulated great wealth in Carolina in the 18th and 19th centuries as major plantation owners with hundreds of slaves.

John and Mary Ladson were the parents of Captain Thomas Ladson (1690–1731), who was the father of William Ladson (1725–1755). William Ladson married Anne Gibbes (1730–1755), a daughter of John Gibbes and a granddaughter of governor Robert Gibbes as well as a great-granddaughter of the first European settler of Carolina Henry Woodward. The Gibbes Museum of Art is named for her family.

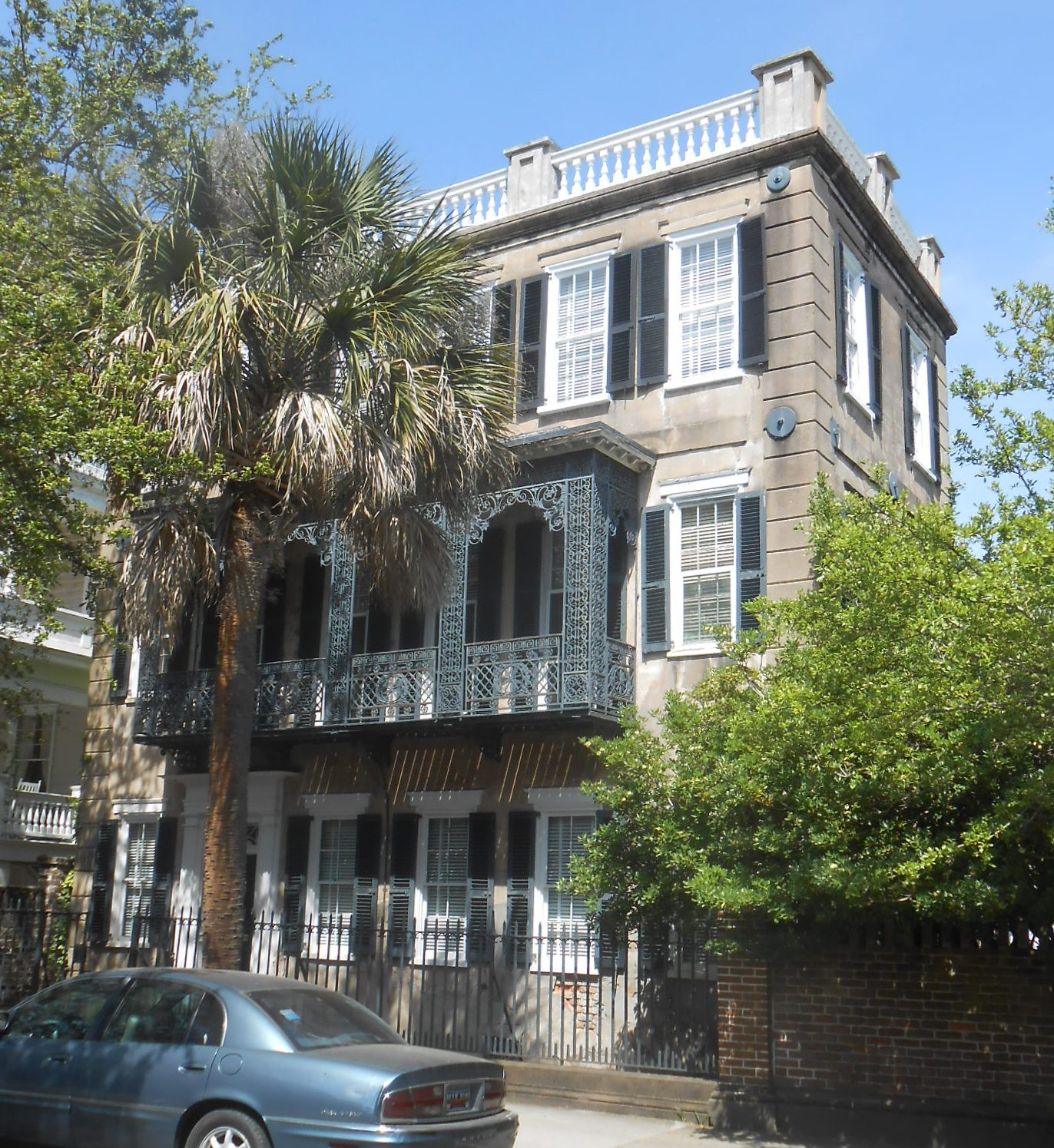
Ladson House in Charleston, named after its former owner James H. Ladson; he lived there with 12 house slaves when not spending time on his two plantations labored by around 200 slaves

William Ladson and Anne Gibbes were the parents of the American revolutionary and Lieutenant Governor of South Carolina James Ladson (1753–1812). James Ladson married Judith Smith, a daughter of the slave trader Benjamin Smith and granddaughter of the largest slave trader in the Thirteen Colonies, Chesterfield-born slave trader Joseph Wragg; she was also a descendant of colonial governors of Carolina Thomas Smith, Joseph Blake, James Moore and John Yeamans. Judith's first cousin Elizabeth Wragg was married to Peter Manigault, the wealthiest man in the British North American colonies by the 1770s. Judith was related to some of the former lords proprietors of Carolina.

Among the children of James and Judith Ladson were the businessman and plantation owner James H. Ladson (1795–1868), who owned over 200 slaves and served as the Danish consul in South Carolina. He was married to Eliza Ann Fraser, a daughter of the merchant and plantation owner Charles Fraser (1782–1860), who owned the Bellevue plantation near the Pocotaligo river and whose grandfather John Fraser had moved from Scotland to South Carolina around 1700.

The Ladson family has numerous descendants who were prominent in American society—especially in South Carolina—as businesspeople, lawyers, and politicians. Through her American great-grandmother Mary Ladson Robertson, Ursula von der Leyen is a descendant of two of the children of lieutenant governor James Ladson, including James H. Ladson, and lived briefly under the name Rose Ladson.

Ladson Street and Ladson House in Charleston, the town of Ladson, South Carolina and the Ladson Formation are named after the family.
