= James H. Ladson =

American planter and businessman (1795–1868)

Consul James H. Ladson
- Born: June 11, 1795; Charleston, South Carolina, U.S.
- Died: April 3, 1868 (aged 72); Charleston, South Carolina, U.S.
- Occupations: Plantation owner, rice merchant, consul
- Spouse: Eliza Ann Fraser
- Parents: James Ladson (father); Judith Smith (mother)
- Family: Ladson family

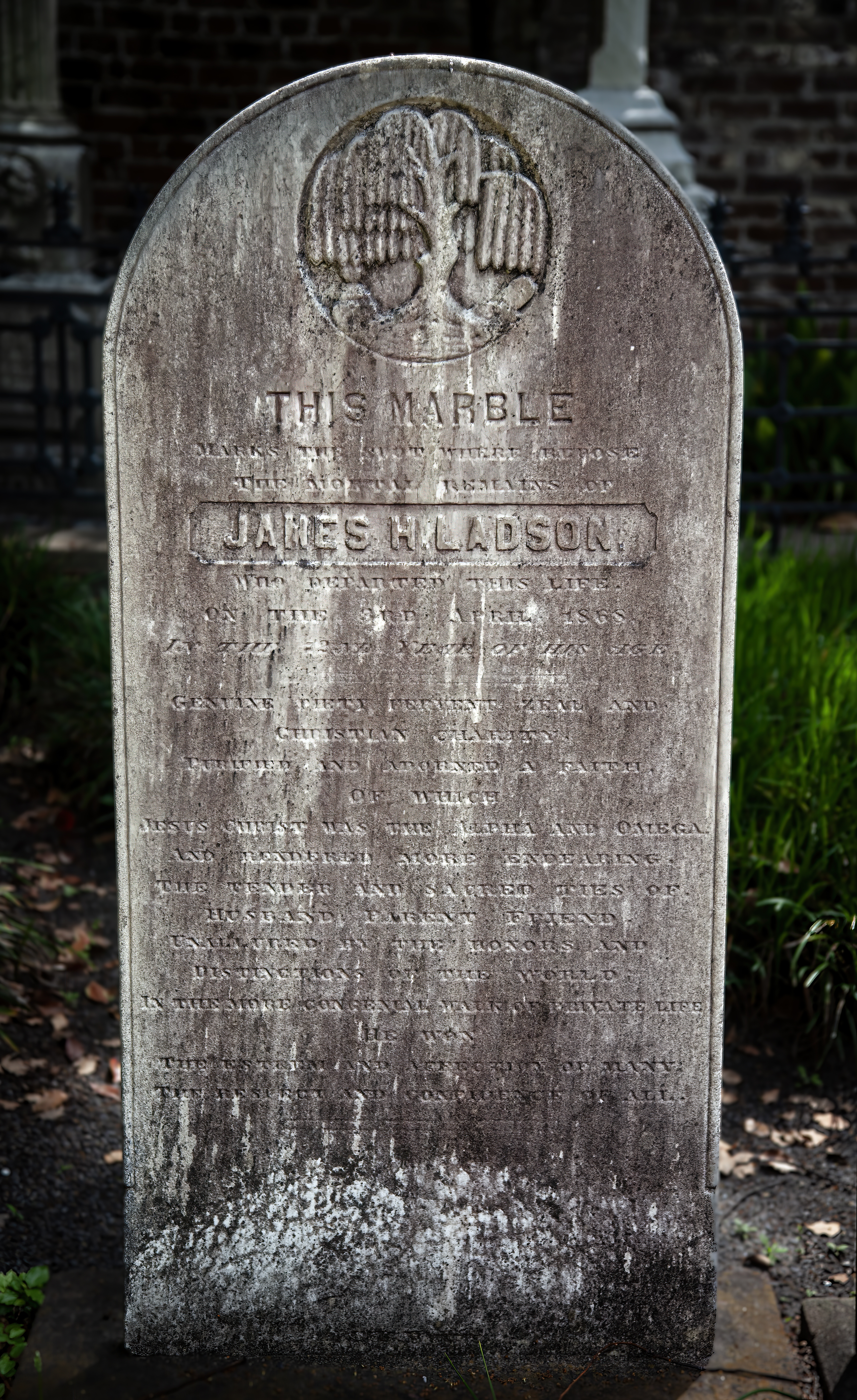
Gravestone of James H. Ladson, St. Michael's Church, Charleston, South Carolina

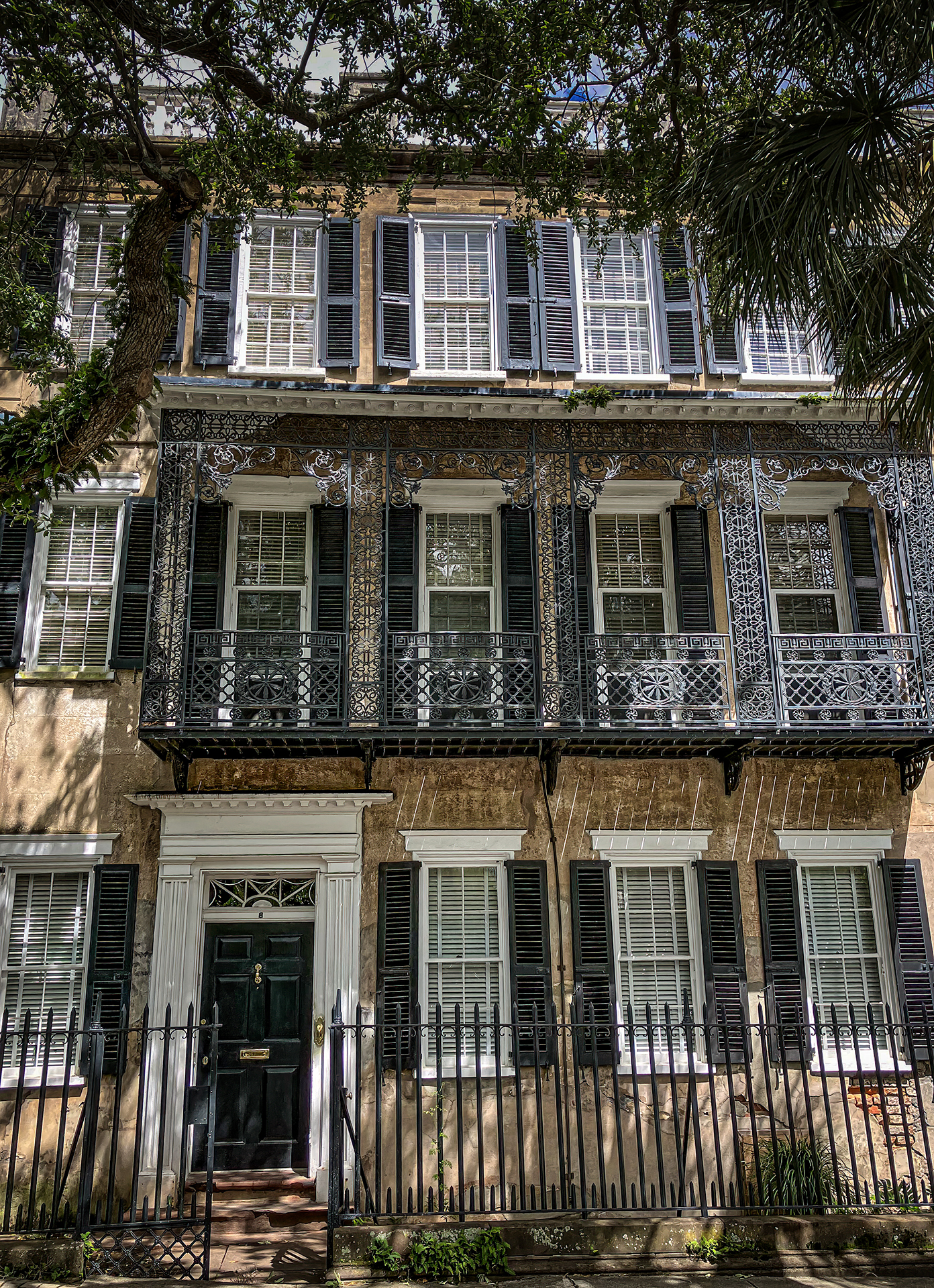
James H. Ladson House, 8 Meeting Street, Charleston, South Carolina. April 2023.

James Henry Ladson (1795–1868) was an American planter and businessman from Charleston, South Carolina. He was the owner of James H. Ladson & Co., a major Charleston firm that was active in the rice and cotton business, and owned over 200 slaves. He was also the Danish Consul in South Carolina, a director of the State Bank and held numerous other business, church and civic offices. James H. Ladson was a strong proponent of slavery and especially the use of religion to maintain discipline among the slaves. He and other members of the Charleston planter and merchant elite played a key role in launching the American Civil War. Among Ladson's descendants is Ursula von der Leyen, who briefly lived under the alias Rose Ladson.

== Life ==
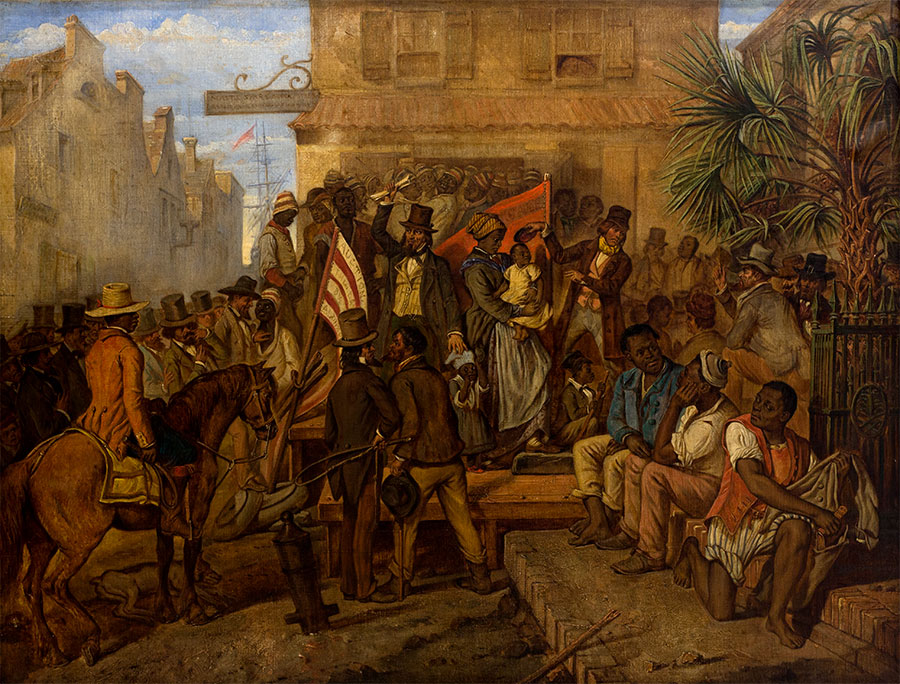
Painting by Eyre Crowe, A Slave Sale in Charleston, South Carolina, 1854

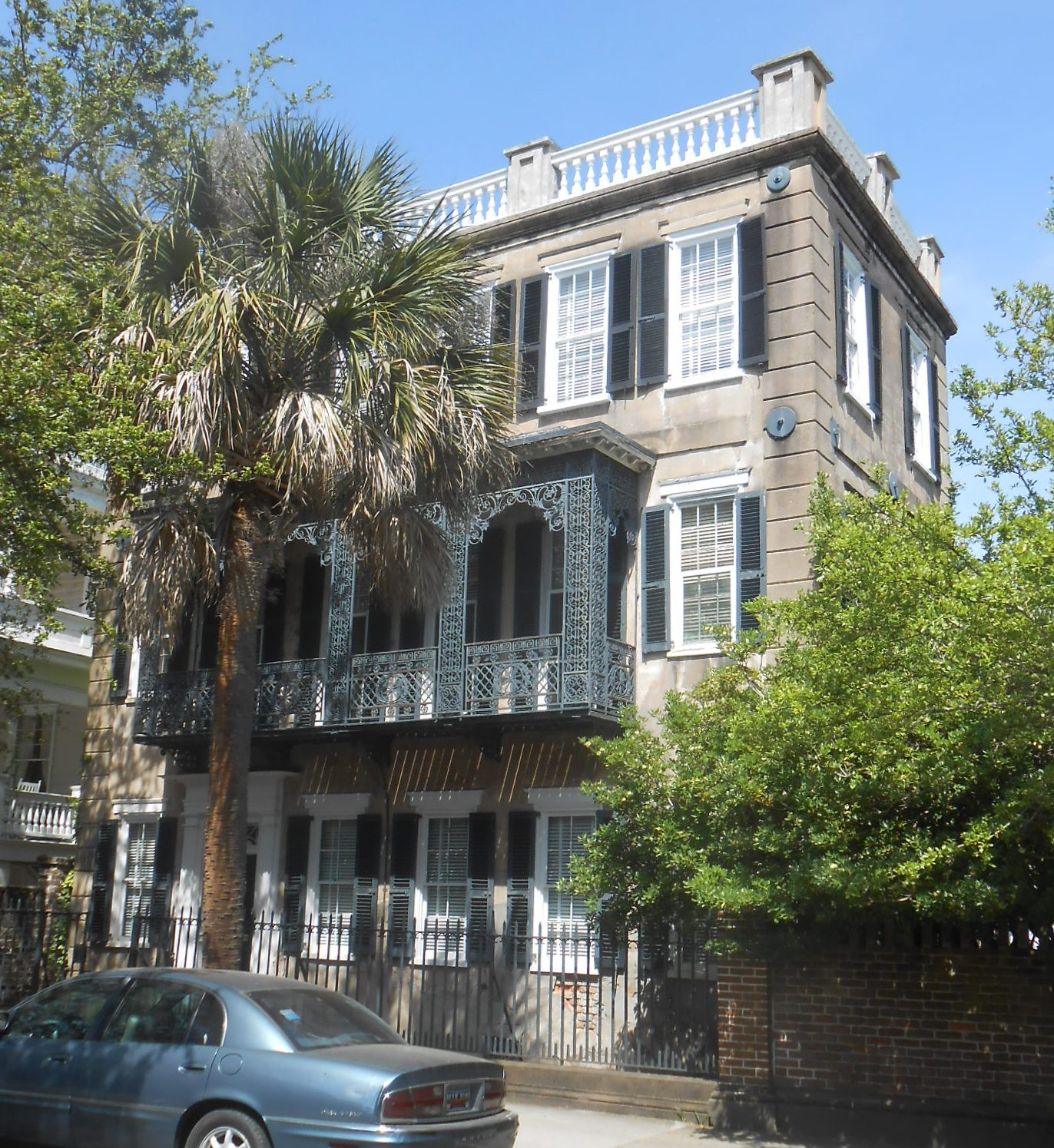
The front of his town house, the Ladson Ladson in 8 Meeting Street, where he lived with his family and 12 slaves part of the year

He belonged to one of South Carolina's most prominent planter and merchant families, that had played a major role in the colonization of Carolina and the slave trade in the Thirteen Colonies. He was the son of former Lieutenant Governor of South Carolina James Ladson and Judith Smith, and descended from many former British colonial governors. His maternal grandfather was the merchant banker, politician and slave trader Benjamin Smith. He was mainly of English and Scottish descent, and also had some French ancestors. The Ladson family emigrated from Northamptonshire to Barbados and then to South Carolina as one of the first English settlers in 1679. His great-grandfather Joseph Wragg was the largest slave trader in British North America. Among his other ancestors were governors John Yeamans, James Moore, Robert Gibbes, Thomas Smith and Joseph Blake, and the first European settler of Carolina Henry Woodward. The Gibbes Museum of Art is named for his grandmother's family.

He owned the La Grange and Fawn Hill plantations, which produced around 600,000 pounds of rice each year. He owned over 200 slaves by 1850. His business partner William Cattell Bee was a cousin of Barnard Elliott Bee Jr.

Ladson was a prominent community leader in the Charleston area. He was the Danish Consul in South Carolina from 1831. He was also a director of the State Bank and held various leadership roles in the Episcopal Church, e.g. as a member of the standing committee of the diocese. The Charleston Mercury noted that he was "respected by all, and disesteemed by none". The Charleston Daily News described him as "an excellent specimen of the old Carolina gentleman, pure in character, and high-toned in his dealings, and was for many years the head of the house of James H. Ladson & Co., now represented by the firm of W.C. Bee & Co. This firm carried on an extensive and lucrative business as rice and cotton factors. He was also a bank director, and for most of his life a leading member of St. Michael's Episcopal Church of our city, where he stood foremost in Christian virtues and active benevolence."

James H. Ladson was part of the oligarchy of elite planters and merchants who controlled Charleston, a city that played a major role in the history of slavery in the United States, and he and several of his family members were actively involved in launching the American Civil War. A proponent of "states' rights", he was a vice-president of the Great Southern Rights and Southern Co-Operation Meeting in Charleston in 1851.

He spent "a portion of the year" on his North Santee plantation, but otherwise lived in a town house in Charleston with 12 domestic slaves. His company's business address was 13 Southern Wharf.

His sister Sarah Reeve Ladson was a prominent socialite who was married to the Baltimore merchant, ship owner, East India importer and art collector Robert Gilmor, Jr. Sarah Reeve Ladson was regarded as one of the most fashionable American women of her time, and was the subject of several portraits and sculptures, including a famous portrait by Thomas Sully. Art historian Maurie D. McInnis notes that "she visually made reference to the taste of the slave women around whom she had been raised" with the turban and bright colours.

He was married to Eliza Ann Fraser, a daughter of the merchant and plantation owner Charles Fraser (1782–1860), who owned the Bellevue plantation near the Pocotaligo river and whose grandfather John Fraser had moved from Scotland to South Carolina around 1700. His father-in-law was a nephew of John Rutledge. His wife was also a niece of the painter Charles Fraser, who painted miniature portraits of him and his wife in 1826. Their son, Major William Henry Ladson (1829–1861), was a partner in his father's business J.H. Ladson & Co. and a Confederate officer who was killed during the American Civil War. The latter was the grandfather of Mary Ladson Robertson, who was the great-grandmother of Ursula von der Leyen, who for a year lived under the name Rose Ladson in London to escape terrorists.

Ladson, South Carolina, is named in honour of his family.

== Views on slavery ==
In 1845, he described his views on the use of religion to maintain control over the slaves.

The religious and moral instruction of the negroes has, for several years, been a subject of great interest to me, and I am satisfied that our exertions in their behalf (although much, very much, yet remains to be done) are not only misunderstood abroad, but unappreciated. To improve the negro is a far more arduous task than many, who have no experience in teaching them, are aware. They are naturally dull, and of a weak intellect, but generally possessing good memories; and those who have been engaged in this work of charity, have to lament, after much labour, that the instruction they have endeavoured to give, although remembered, has been perverted and misdirected.

— James H. Ladson, "The Religious Instruction of the Negroes" (1845)

Ladson believed strongly in religious instruction to maintain discipline among the slaves and built his own chapel on the plantation that could accommodate around 100–110 slaves at a time. He stated:

I am satisfied that the influence of this instruction upon the discipline of my plantation, and on the spirit and subordination of the negroes has been most beneficial. Their spirits are cheerful, as I judge from their gaiety of heart, and the respect for the overseer, and drivers, is evidenced by, generally, a ready obedience to orders.

— James H. Ladson, "The Religious Instruction of the Negroes" (1845)

== Ancestry ==
Ancestors of James H. Ladson

16. John Ladson (1665–1698); immigrated to Carolina 1679
8. Captain Thomas Ladson
17. Mary Stanyarne; born in Barbados
4. William Ladson (1725–1755)
18.
9. Mary Graves
19.
2. James Ladson; Lieutenant Governor of South Carolina
20. Robert Gibbes; landgrave and governor
10. Colonel John Gibbes (1696–1764)
21. Mary Davis
5. Anne Gibbes (1730–1755)
22. John Woodward; son of the colonist Henry Woodward
11. Mary Woodward
23. Sarah Stanyarne
1. James H. Ladson
24. Thomas Smith; of Nevis; captain of a merchant vessel
12. Thomas Smith, of Nevis
25. Elizabeth Schenckingh
6. Benjamin Smith (1717–1770); merchant banker, slave trader; Speaker of the Royal Assembly
26. Thomas Smith II; landgrave and judge son of governor Thomas Smith
13. Sabina Smith
27. Sarah Blake; daughter of governor Joseph Blake
3. Judith Smith
28. John Wragg
14. Joseph Wragg (1698–1750); slave trader in Carolina, from London
29. Mary
7. Mary Wragg
30. Jacques (James) DuBose (ca. 1676–1706)
15. Judith DuBose
31. Marie (Mary) DuGue (1665–1726)
