= James Ladson =

American politician

James Henry Ladson
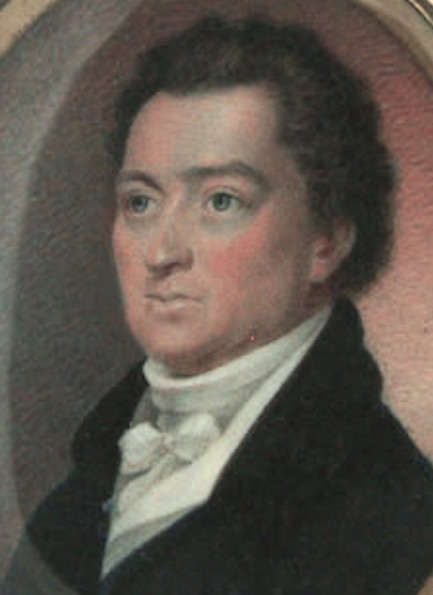

15th Lieutenant Governor of South Carolina
- In office December 5, 1792 – December 17, 1794
- Governor: William Moultrie
- Preceded by: Isaac Holmes
- Succeeded by: Lewis Morris

State Senator of South Carolina
- In office 1800–1804

Personal details
- Born: 1753
- Died: 1812 (aged 58–59)
- Party: Federalist Party
- Spouse: Judith Smith
- Children: James H. Ladson; Sarah Reeve Ladson
- Relatives: Ladson family

James Henry Ladson (1753 – 1812) was an American politician, wealthy plantation owner from Charles Town and officer of the American Revolution. He served as the 15th lieutenant governor of South Carolina from 1792 to 1794, and was a member of the South Carolina state Senate from 1800 to 1804.

The President of the European Commission Ursula von der Leyen is descended both from his son James H. Ladson and from his daughter Elizabeth Ladson, and by adoption additionally from his daughter Sarah Reeve Ladson; von der Leyen lived under the name Rose Ladson in London in the late 1970s.

== Early life ==
James Ladson was born in 1753 in Charleston to a prominent South Carolinian family of English origin. He was the son of William Ladson and Anne Gibbes. His great-grandfather John Ladson emigrated from Northamptonshire in England to Barbados and then to Carolina as one of the first English settlers in 1679, where he built a large plantation and served in the Commons House of Assembly from 1685. His mother was the daughter of the prominent colonial official Colonel John Gibbes (1696–1764) and the granddaughter of the colonial governor Robert Gibbes. The Gibbes Museum of Art is named for his mother's family. James Ladson was also a 2nd great-grandson of Henry Woodward, the first British colonist in Carolina.

Following the early death of his parents he was raised by his uncle John Gibbes (1733–1780), who owned the Grove Plantation that included today's Hampton Park and its surrounding neighbourhoods. He attended the best schools in South Carolina. In 1773 he traveled to England to pursue his education, returning to South Carolina the following year. He owned a plantation in St Andrew Parish and a plantation named Fawn Hill on the Santeee River, and a house and other properties in Charleston.

He served as an officer during the American Revolutionary War from 1775 to 1780, first alongside his childhood friend Thomas Pinckney and eventually as a captain in the 1st regiment of the Continental Line. He served as aide de camp to General Benjamin Lincoln during the 1780 siege of Charleston. He later was promoted to major. Thomas Pinckney related his memories of James Ladson's early life and particularly his service in the revolutionary war in an 1824 letter to Ladson's son James H. Ladson.

== Political career ==
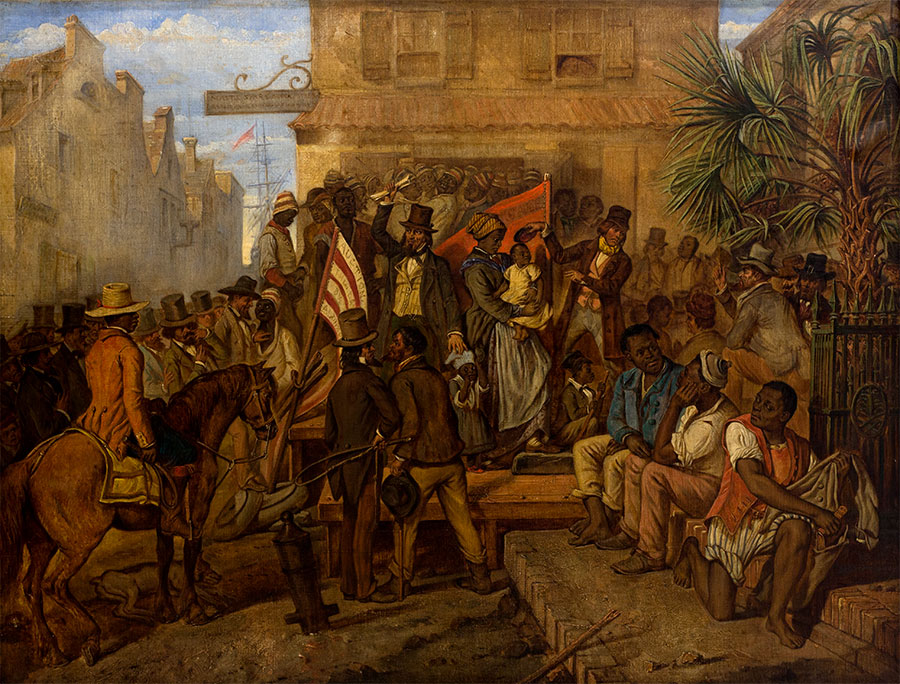
Eyre Crowe, A Slave Sale in Charleston, South Carolina.

Following the American Revolutionary Wars he became involved in politics in South Carolina. He served as a member of the South Carolina General Assembly from 1785 to 1790. He voted to ratify the federal Constitution in 1788 as a delegate for St. Andrew at the state convention. He served as Lieutenant Governor of South Carolina from 1792 to 1794.

He was again elected to the South Carolina General Assembly in 1798, and served as a senator in the state Senate from 1800 to 1804.

He also served in various local offices, e.g. as commissioner to rebuild the bridge over Ashley in 1792.

At the time the U.S. Constitution was adopted in 1788 he was reported to own 1,717 acres valued at $10,384 and 142 slaves. According to the inventory of his estate he owned 104 slaves at the time of his death.

== Personal life ==
On 1 October 1778, he married Judith Smith (1762–1820), who belonged to one of South Carolina's wealthiest banker-merchant families; her father Benjamin Smith (1717–1770) was one of South Carolina's most prominent merchant bankers, a plantation owner, a slave trader, the long-time Speaker of the Royal Assembly and a great-grandson of South Carolina governor and landgrave Thomas Smith. His wife was a granddaughter of the largest slave trader in British North America Joseph Wragg, a first cousin of governor of North Carolina Benjamin Smith, and a first cousin of Elizabeth Wragg Manigault, who was married to the wealthiest man in the British North American colonies Peter Manigault.

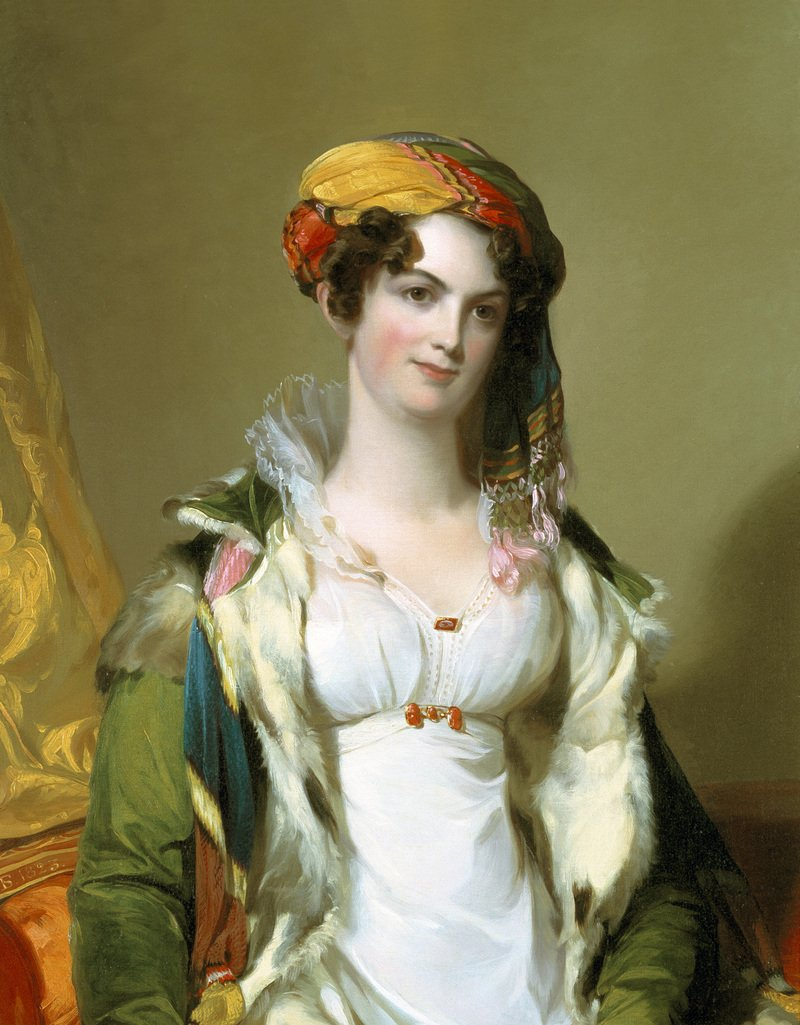
His daughter Sarah Reeve Ladson painted by Thomas Sully; in the portrait "she visually made reference to the taste of the slave women around whom she had been raised" with the turban and bright colours

The James Ladson House in Charleston was built for him around 1792; Ladson Street was named in his honour in 1895.

His daughter Sarah Reeve Ladson was married to the art collector Robert Gilmor, Jr.; regarded as one of the most fashionable American women of her time, she was the subject of several portraits and sculptures, including a famous portrait by Thomas Sully. Art historian Maurie McInnis notes that "she visually made reference to the taste of the slave women around whom she had been raised" with the turban and bright colours.

James Ladson was the father of James H. Ladson (1795–1868), a major plantation owner who by 1850 owned over 200 slaves who produced 600,000 pounds of rice each year on his La Grange and Fawn Hill plantations, who was also the Danish Consul in South Carolina. James H. Ladson's son, Major William Henry Ladson, married the daughter of Isabel Ann Baron, the biological daughter of the physician Alexander Baron and James Ladson's daughter Elizabeth Ladson; Isabel Ann Baron had been raised and informally adopted by her aunt Sarah Reeve Ladson and her husband. Among their descendants are Ursula von der Leyen, who for a year lived under the name Rose Ladson in London to escape terrorists.

His son James H. Ladson wrote on his views on slavery in 1845.

Ladson, South Carolina, is named in honour of his family.

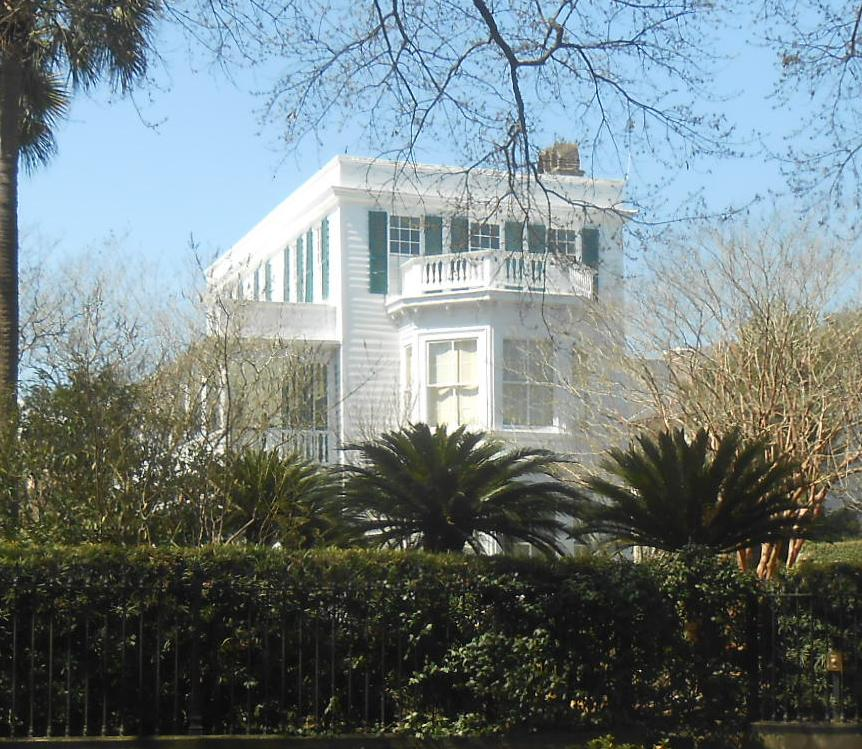
His town house, James Ladson House (31 Meeting Street)

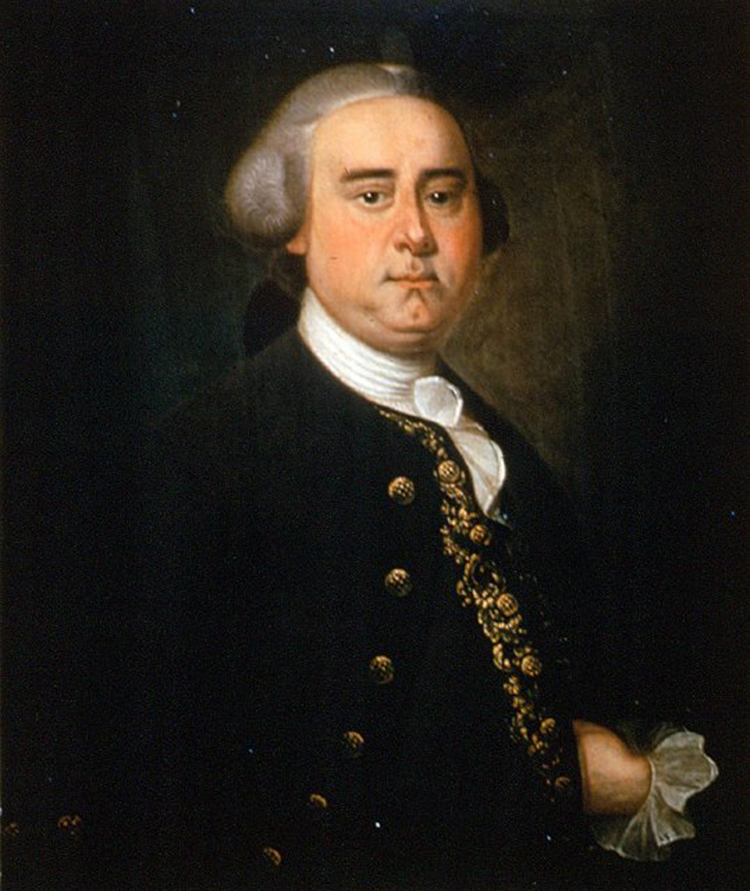
His father-in-law Benjamin Smith

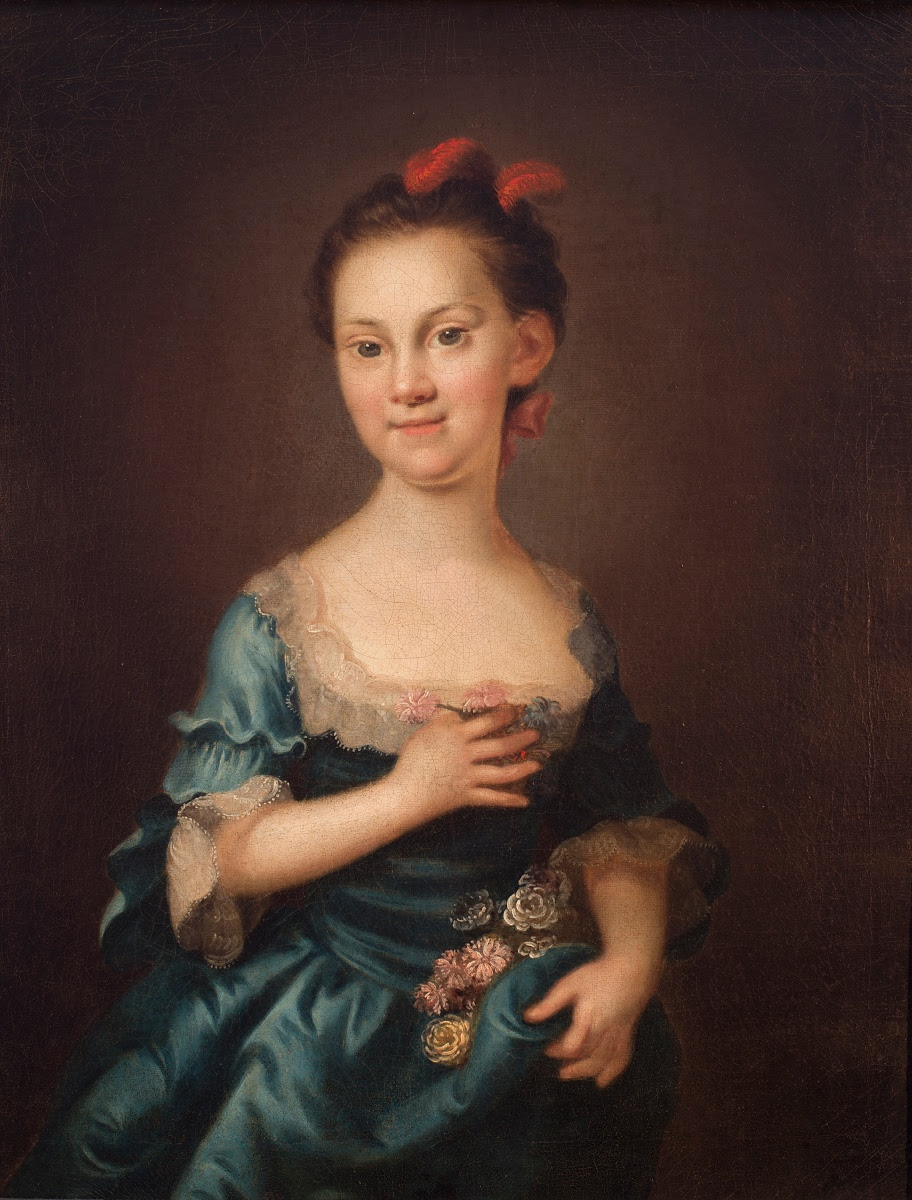
His wife Judith Smith as a child in 1767

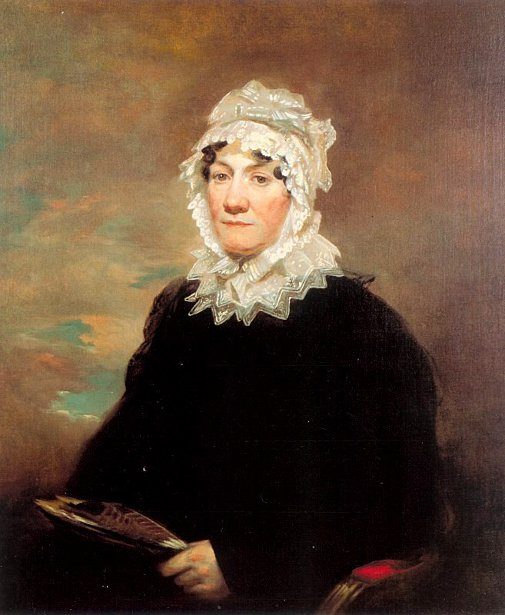
His wife Judith Smith

== Ancestry ==
Ancestors of James Ladson

16. John Ladson
8. John Ladson (1665–1698); immigrated to Carolina 1679
17. Susanna Moseley
4. Captain Thomas Ladson
18. Thomas Stanyarne
9. Mary Stanyarne
19. Mary Baynes Waight
2. William Ladson (1725–1755)
20.
10.
21.
5. Mary Graves
22.
11.
23.
1. James Ladson
24. Robert Gibbes
12. Robert Gibbes; landgrave and governor
25. Mary Coventry
6. Colonel John Gibbes (1696–1764)
26. Captain William Davis
13. Mary Davis
27. Eleanor
3. Anne Gibbes (1730–1755)
28. Henry Woodward; the first British colonist in Carolina
14. John Woodward
29. Mary Godfrey
7. Mary Woodward
30. James Stanyarne
15. Sarah Stanyarne
31. Rachel Fitch

Political offices
Preceded by Isaac Holmes	Lieutenant Governor of South Carolina; 1792–1794	Succeeded by Lewis Morris
