= Sarah Reeve Ladson =

American socialite and arts patron

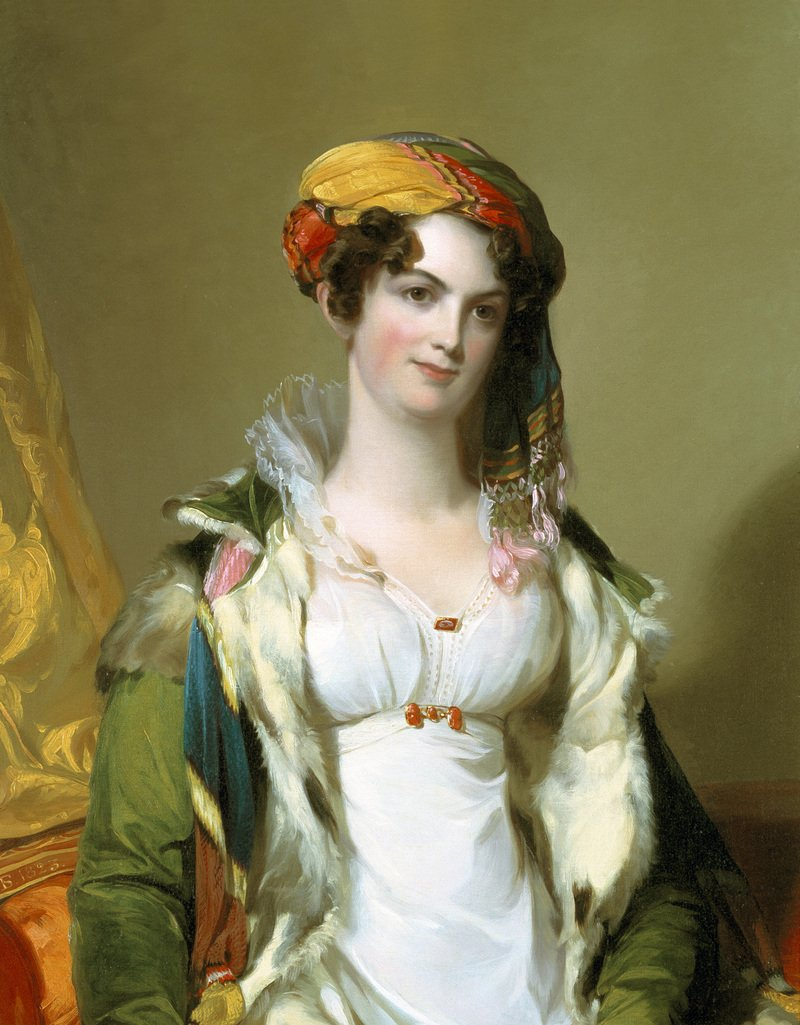
- 1823 portrait of Ladson, titled Mrs. Robert Gilmor, Jr. by Thomas Sully
- Born: 1790; Charleston, South Carolina; United States
- Died: 1866 (aged 75–76)
- Other name: Sarah Gilmor (married name)
- Spouse: Robert Gilmor Jr.
- Parent(s): James Ladson; Judith Smith
- Relatives: Ladson family

Sarah Reeve Ladson (1790-1866) was an American socialite, arts patron, and style icon. Born into a prominent Charleston family, she was an influential member of the South Carolinian planter class. She was regarded as one of the most fashionable American women of her time and was the subject of various portraits and sculptures.

== Biography ==
Ladson was born in Charleston, South Carolina to James Ladson, a wealthy planter and slave owner, and Judith Smith. A member of the prominent Ladson family, her father was a military officer in the American Revolutionary War and served as the Lieutenant-Governor of South Carolina. Her mother, Judith, was a daughter of Benjamin Smith, a South Carolina slave trader, planter, banker and speaker in the colony's Royal Assembly. Through her mother, Ladson was a descendant of Thomas Smith, a colonial governor of South Carolina, and Joseph Wragg, a slave trader and politician. Ladson was a sister of James H. Ladson.

On April 9, 1807, she married Robert Gilmor Jr., a merchant from Baltimore. She was his second wife. They had no biological children, but raised their niece, Isabel Ann Baron. They later supported the business endeavors of Isabel's husband, John McPherson Brien.

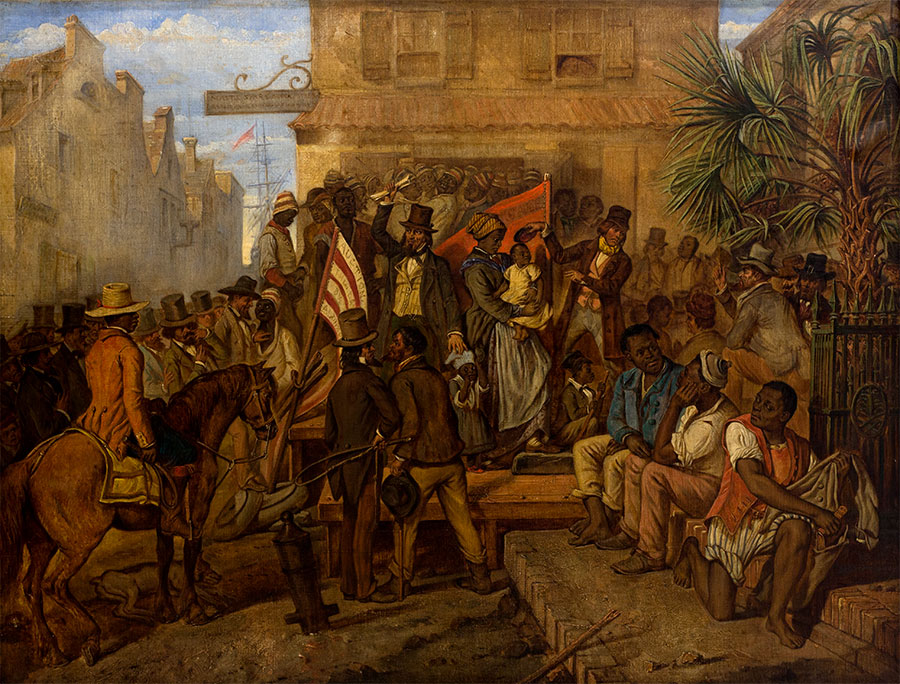
Painting by Eyre Crowe, A Slave Sale in Charleston, South Carolina, 1854

Ladson was prominent in both Charleston and Baltimore society, and was regarded as one of the most fashionable American women of her time. A patron of the arts, she was the subject of various portraits and sculptures, including a portrait by Thomas Sully and a sculpture by Horatio Greenough that are on display at the Gibbes Museum of Art. A portrait by Edward Greene Malbone is in the collection of the Mead Art Museum at Amherst College.

Maurie D. McInnis, an art historian, noted that Ladson "visually made reference to the taste of the slave women around whom she had been raised" with the turban and bright colours portrayed in Sully's portrait of her. Sully's portrait of Ladson has been exhibited in Grandeur Preserved: Masterworks Presented by Historic Charleston Foundation in New York, and Art in America: Three Hundred Years of Innovation in Shanghai and Beijing.

The schooner Sarah Ladson was named after her.
