= Robert Gilmor Jr. =

American merchant and art collector (1774–1848)

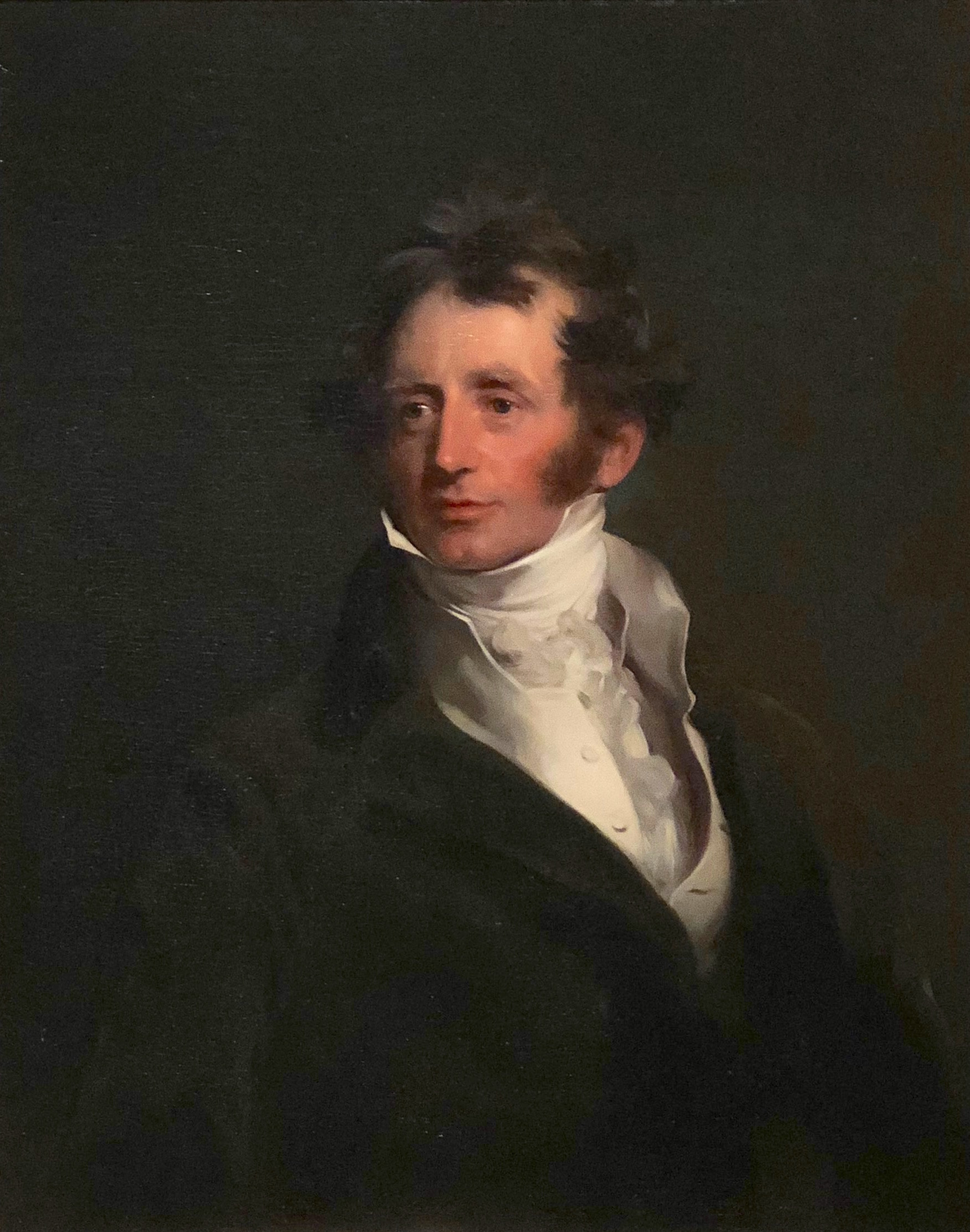
Robert Gilmor

Robert Gilmor Jr. (1774–1848) was an American merchant, shipowner, East-India importer and art collector from Baltimore. He was regarded as "one [of] the most significant art collectors and patrons in the United States before 1850." His collection included art, antiquities, rare books, autographs, coins, stamps, rocks, and minerals. His collection included 14th century Old Masters and 17th century Dutch and Flemish works.

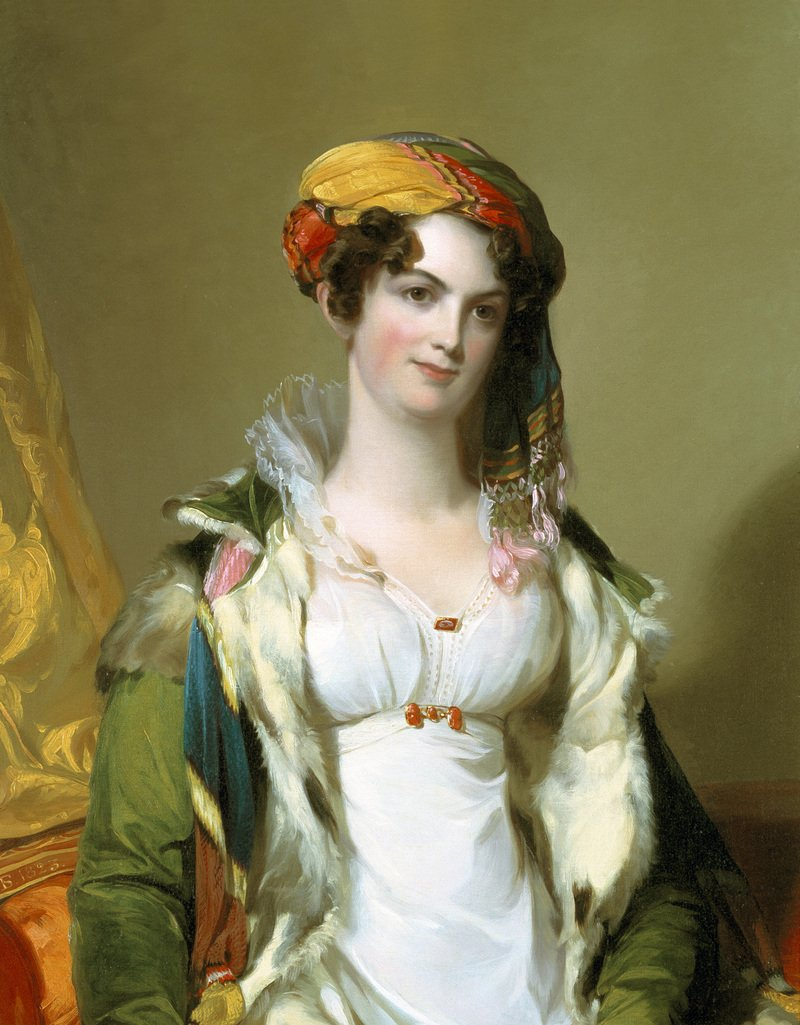
His second wife Sarah Reeve Ladson

He was a son of Revolutionary War leader, Robert Gilmor, Sr. (1748-1822). He married Sarah Reeve Ladson in 1807; his second wife was a daughter of South Carolina lieutenant-governor James Ladson and Judith Smith. Portraits by Thomas Sully of both Gilmor and his wife are owned by the Gibbes Museum of Art.

Gilmor and Sarah Ladson had no biological children, but they raised her niece Isabel Ann Baron and "treated her as a daughter," and later supported the business endeavours of her husband John McPherson Brien. Isabel Ann Baron's daughter Isabel Ann Brien was married to Major William Henry Ladson, the son of James H. Ladson, Sarah Ladson's brother.
