= Judith Smith Ladson =

Second Lady of South Carolina

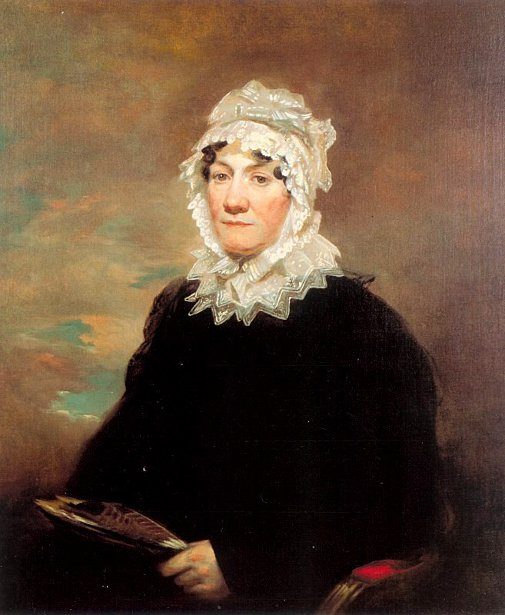
- Portrait of Ladson by Samuel Morse

Second Lady of South Carolina
- Assumed role December 5, 1792 – December 17, 1794
- Lieutenant: James Ladson

Personal details
- Born: Judith Smith; 1766 Charleston, Province of South Carolina, British Empire
- Died: September 4, 1820 (aged 53–54) Charleston, South Carolina; United States
- Resting place: St. Philip's Episcopal Church Cemetery
- Party: Federalist
- Spouse: James Ladson
- Children: 11 (including James and Sarah)
- Parent(s): Benjamin Smith; Mary Wragg
- Relatives: Joseph Wragg (grandfather)

Judith Smith Ladson (May 1766 – September 4, 1820) was an American heiress and socialite who served as the Second Lady of South Carolina. A member of the colonial planter class, she was the daughter of the slave trader Benjamin Smith and the wife of the politician James Ladson, who served as Lieutenant Governor of South Carolina. Through her marriage, she was a member of the Ladson family, one of Charleston's most prominent families.

== Biography ==
Ladson was born in Charleston in 1766 to Benjamin Smith and Mary Wragg. Her father was a prominent planter, slave trader, and merchant who served as Speaker of the South Carolina Royal Assembly. Her mother was a daughter of English slave trader Joseph Wragg and Huguenot heiress Judith DuBose. Ladson was a great-great granddaughter of Thomas Smith and Joseph Blake, who both served as Colonial Governors of the Province of South Carolina. Through her father, she was a descendant of Sir George Smith and Sir Nicholas Smith. Ladson was a first cousin of Benjamin Smith, who served as Governor of North Carolina. Her family, one of the wealthiest families in Charleston, were leading figures in the British colonization of the Americas and the slave trade in British North America.

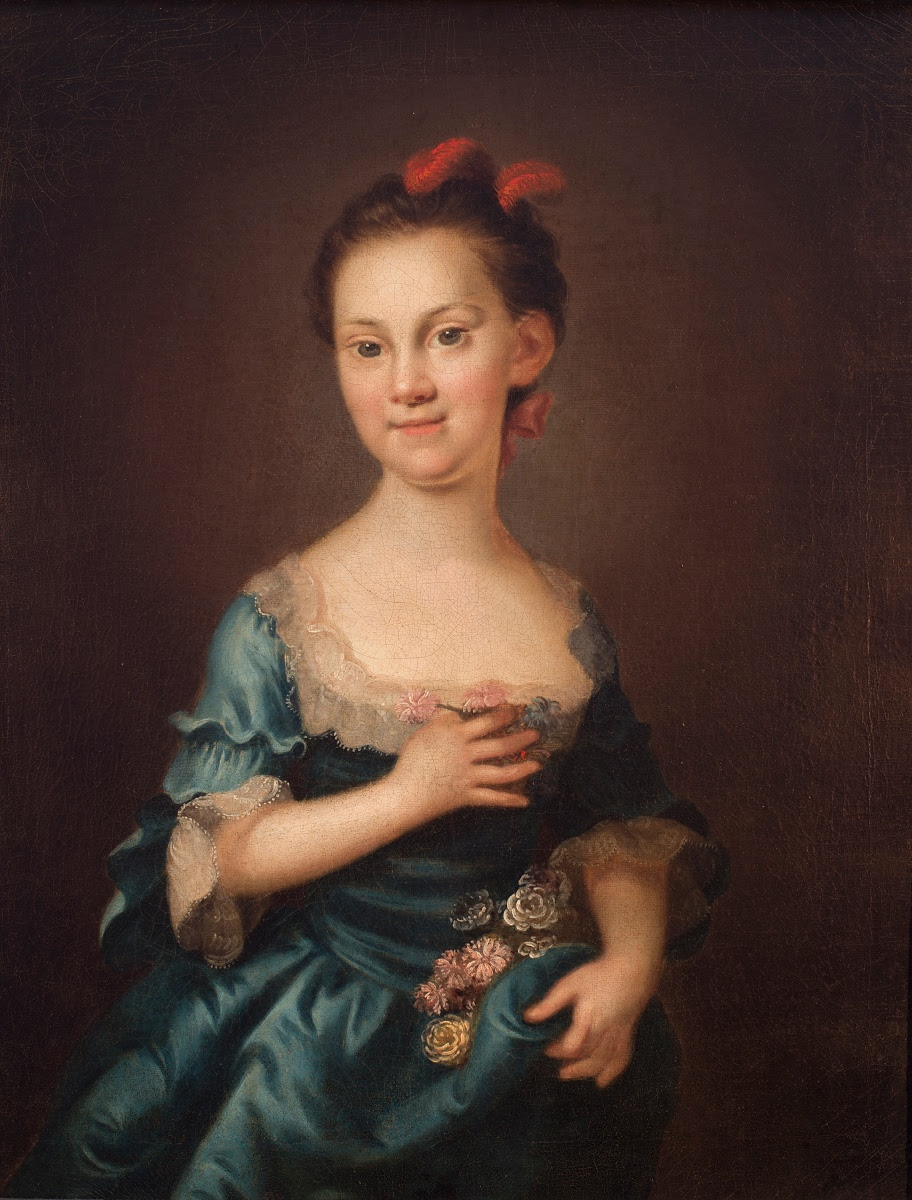
Portrait of Ladson as a child by John Wollaston

She spent her childhood at a mid-18th century townhouse on Broad Street, her family's primary residence. She also spent time at her father's two plantations, the Accabee Plantation in the St. Andrew Parish on the Ashley River, and a two-thousand acre plantation in the St. James Parish near Goose Creek.

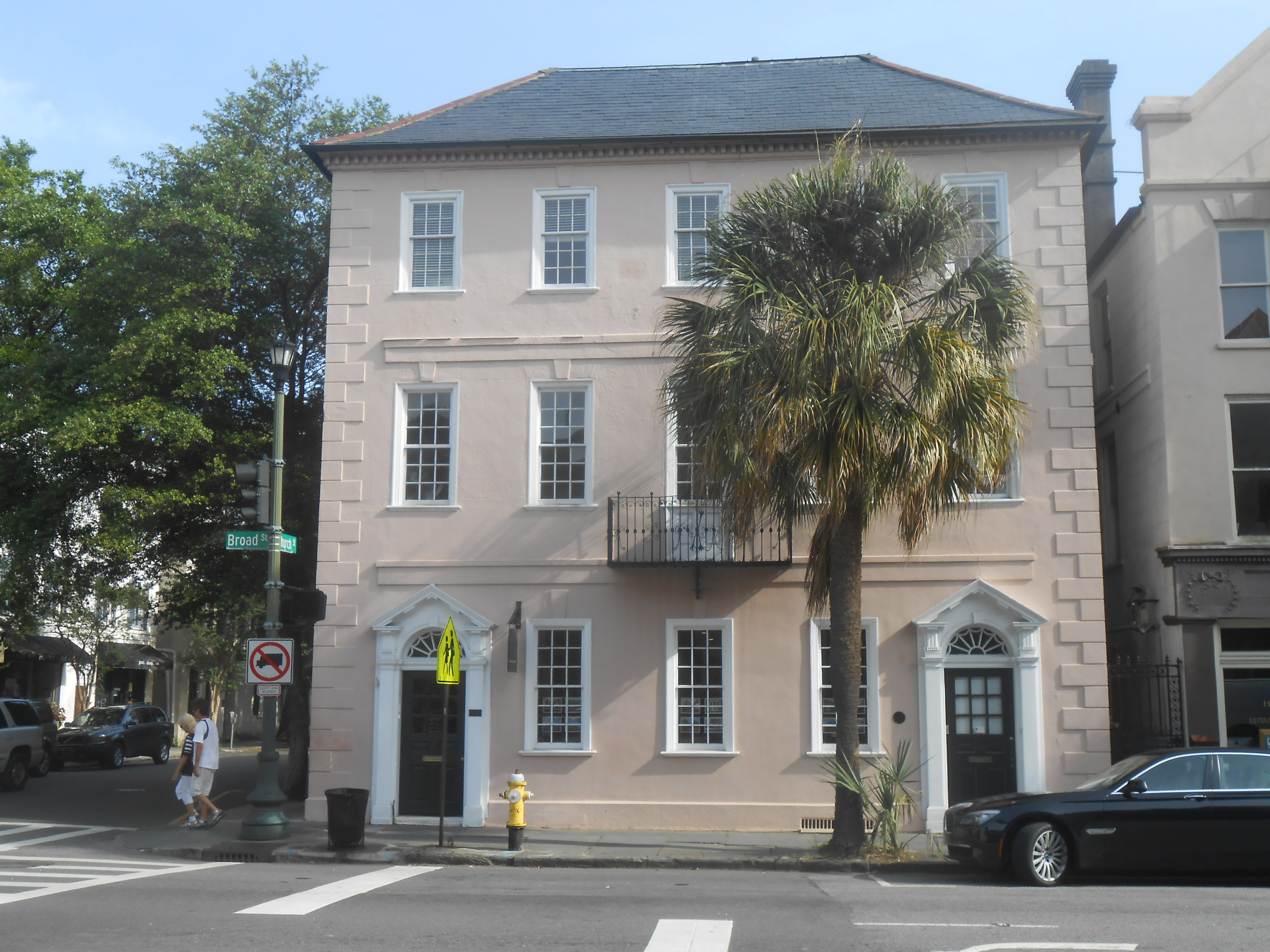
The Benjamin Smith House (49 Broad Street), Ladson's childhood home.

On October 1, 1778, she married James Ladson, a planter and military officer who served in the American Revolutionary War. Prior to their marriage, a settlement was made between Ladson's father and fiancée, setting her dowry at £100,000, which would come in to the possession of her husband upon her marriage. The settlement also conferred that half of the dowry would be inherited by the couple's children, should Ladson's husband die before her.

They had eleven children, including James H. Ladson and Sarah Reeve Ladson. Her husband was elected Lieutenant Governor of South Carolina in 1792.

A prominent society figure, Ladson was painted by portraitists John Wollaston and Samuel Morse, the later whose portrait is on display at the Gibbes Museum of Art.

She died on September 5, 1820, and was buried in the cemetery at St. Philip's Episcopal Church.
