= John Gibbes (Carolina) =

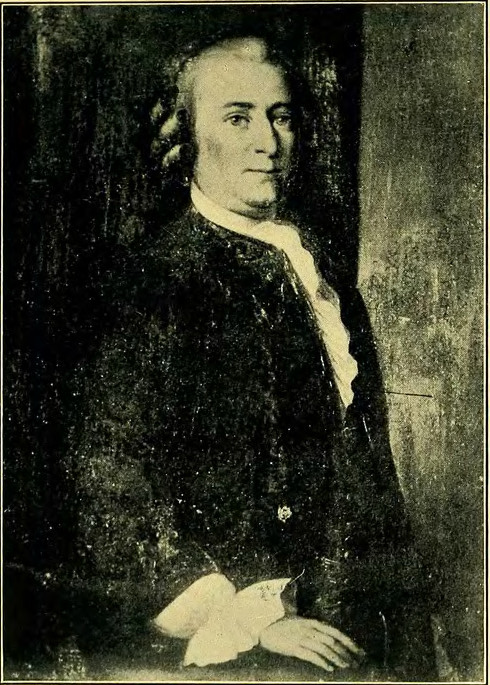
- Born: 21 June 1696
- Died: 18 December 1764 (aged 68)
- Spouse(s): Mary Gibbes
- Children: Robert Gibbes, Anne Gibbes, Mary Barnwell, Sarah Mathews
- Parent(s): Robert Gibbes
- Relatives: William Gibbes

John Gibbes (21 June 1696 – 18 December 1764) was an English military officer and colonial leader in the Province of Carolina. He was the son of governor Robert Gibbes. John Gibbes was a colonel, a wealthy plantation owner, a member of the Royal Assembly and Council, and a deputy Lord proprietor. In 1719 he married Mary Woodward, a granddaughter of Henry Woodward, the first white settler of Carolina.
