= Ladson, South Carolina =

- Census-designated place
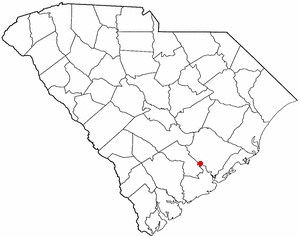
- Location of Ladson, South Carolina
- Coordinates: 33°00′23″N 80°06′50″W
- Country: United States
- State: South Carolina
- Counties: Berkeley, Charleston, Dorchester
- Founded: 1905
- Named for: Ladson family

Area
  - Total: 7.03 sq mi (18.21 km^{2})
  - Land: 7.03 sq mi (18.21 km^{2})
  - Water: 0 sq mi (0.00 km^{2})
- Elevation: 39 ft (12 m)

Population (2020)
  - Total: 15,550
  - Density: 2,211.5/sq mi (853.85/km^{2})
- Time zone: UTC-5 (Eastern (EST))
  - Summer (DST): UTC-4 (EDT)
- ZIP code: 29456
- Area code: 843 and 854
- FIPS code: 45-39220
- GNIS feature ID: 2403184

Ladson is a census-designated place (CDP) in Berkeley, Charleston and Dorchester counties in the U.S. state of South Carolina. The population was 13,790 at the 2010 census. It is named in honor of the Ladson family, one of the oldest planter and merchant families in the Charleston area; one of its members was lieutenant governor James Ladson.

== Geography ==
Ladson is located in southwestern Berkeley County, northern Charleston County, and southeastern Dorchester County. It is bordered to the southwest by the town of Summerville, to the south by the city of North Charleston, to the east by the city of Goose Creek, and to the northwest by Sangaree, a census-designated place.

U.S. Route 78 and Interstate 26 run parallel through Ladson, with Exit 203 providing access from I-26. Downtown Charleston is 20 miles (32 km) to the southeast, and Columbia is 97 miles (156 km) to the northwest.

According to the United States Census Bureau, the CDP has a total area of 7.0 square miles (18.2 km^{2}), all land. This is a decrease from 8.6 square miles (22.3 km^{2}) at the 2000 census, due to annexations of portions of the area into Summerville and North Charleston.

== Demographics ==
Historical population
Census	Pop.	Note	%±
2000	13,264		—
2010	13,790		4.0%
2020	15,550		12.8%
U.S. Decennial Census

=== 2020 census ===
Ladson racial composition
Race	Num.	Perc.
White (non-Hispanic)	7,633	49.09%
Black or African American (non-Hispanic)	4,041	25.99%
Native American	91	0.59%
Asian	407	2.62%
Pacific Islander	9	0.06%
Other/Mixed	907	5.83%
Hispanic or Latino	2,462	15.83%

As of the 2020 census, Ladson had a population of 15,550. The median age was 35.2 years. 26.0% of residents were under the age of 18 and 11.9% of residents were 65 years of age or older. For every 100 females there were 98.2 males, and for every 100 females age 18 and over there were 95.4 males age 18 and over.

100.0% of residents lived in urban areas, while 0.0% lived in rural areas.

There were 5,384 households in Ladson, of which 39.1% had children under the age of 18 living in them. Of all households, 47.8% were married-couple households, 17.5% were households with a male householder and no spouse or partner present, and 26.1% were households with a female householder and no spouse or partner present. About 20.1% of all households were made up of individuals and 6.6% had someone living alone who was 65 years of age or older. There were 3,767 families residing in the CDP.

There were 5,691 housing units, of which 5.4% were vacant. The homeowner vacancy rate was 1.6% and the rental vacancy rate was 6.9%.

=== 2010 census ===
Ladson racial composition (2010)
Race	Num.	Perc.
White (non-Hispanic)	7,885	57.18%
Black or African American (non-Hispanic)	3,532	25.61%
Native American	95	0.69%
Asian	286	2.07%
Pacific Islander	7	0.05%
Other/Mixed	431	3.13%
Hispanic or Latino	1,554	11.27%

As of the 2010 United States census, there were 13,790 people, 4,709 households, and 3,625 families residing in the CDP.

=== 2000 census ===
As of the census of 2000, there were 13,264 people, 4,571 households, and 3,560 families residing in the CDP. The population density was 1,540.9 inhabitants per square mile (594.9/km^{2}). There were 4,863 housing units at an average density of 564.9 per square mile (218.1/km^{2}). The racial makeup of the CDP was 71.70% White, 22.06% African American, 0.97% Native American, 2.04% Asian, 0.07% Pacific Islander, 1.30% from other races, and 1.86% from two or more races. Hispanic or Latino of any race were 2.97% of the population.

There were 4,571 households, out of which 44.3% had children under the age of 18 living with them, 56.4% were married couples living together, 15.8% had a female householder with no husband present, and 22.1% were non-families. 15.9% of all households were made up of individuals, and 3.0% had someone living alone who was 65 years of age or older. The average household size was 2.90 and the average family size was 3.22.

In the CDP, the population was spread out, with 30% under the age of 18, 9.7% from 18 to 24, 33.7% from 25 to 44, 20.7% from 45 to 64, and 4.9% who were 65 years of age or older. The median age was 31 years. For every 100 females, there were 99.3 males. For every 100 females age 18 and over, there were 96.4 males.

The median income for a household in the CDP was $41,589, and the median income for a family was $44,726. Males had a median income of $31,290 versus $23,524 for females. The per capita income for the CDP was $16,482. About 7.1% of families and 9.8% of the population were below the poverty line, including 13.5% of those under age 18 and 9.3% of those age 65 or over.
