= Benjamin Smith (slave trader) =

American slave trader, planter, shipowner, merchant, banker and politician (1717–1770)

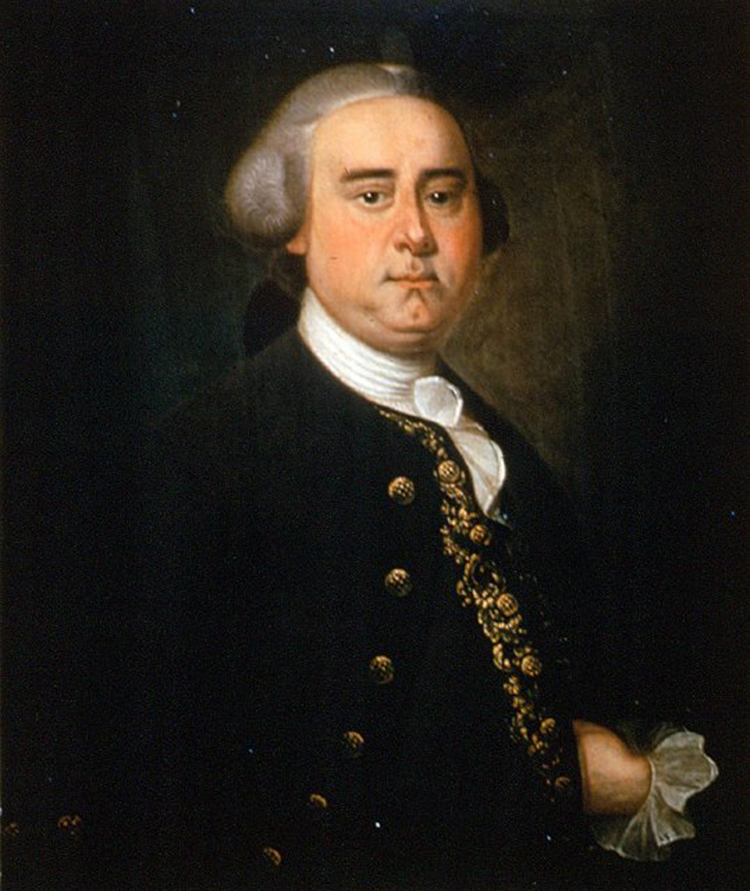
- Smith by Jeremiah Theus

Speaker of the South Carolina House of Representatives
- In office 1755–1763

Personal details
- Born: 1717 Goose Creek, South Carolina, Great Britain
- Died: 1763 (aged 45–46)

Benjamin Smith (1717 – 1770) was an American slave trader, planter, shipowner, merchant, banker and politician who served as speaker of the South Carolina House of Assembly from 1755 to 1763.

== Biography ==
He was born in St James Goose Creek near Charles Town and was the son of Thomas Smith and Sabina Smith, both of English descent; his father was a planter from Nevis in the British West Indies, while his mother belonged to one of the oldest and most prominent families of South Carolina, as a daughter of the landgrave, judge and important colonial leader Thomas Smith II and a granddaughter of two royals governors, Thomas Smith and Joseph Blake. He was also descended from governors John Yeamans and James Moore. Benjamin Smith was also the uncle of North Carolina governor Benjamin Smith.

He was one of the most prominent merchant bankers in the colony in his lifetime. He inherited a two-thousand-acre plantation located in the St James Goose Creek parish. He also owned the Accabee plantation on the Ashley River and several other properties, including a town house with twelve slaves in Charleston. The town house, the family's primary residence, was built in the 1740s and is located on 49 Broad Street in Charleston; it is now known as the Benjamin Smith House.

He was active in the slave trade and the fur trade, and owned seven ships with some other merchants. He held numerous civic offices and served in the Royal Assembly from 1747 to 1765, including as Speaker for many years. He also funded a "negro school" run by the priest Alexander Garden.

Benjamin Smith was married to Mary Wragg, a daughter of Judith DuBose and Joseph Wragg, who was for some decades the largest slave trader in North America. They were the parents of Judith Smith who was married to the revolutionary officer and lieutenant governor of South Carolina James Ladson.

== Ancestry ==
Ancestors of Benjamin Smith (slave trader)

8. Thomas Smith
4. Thomas Smith; of Nevis; captain of a merchant vessel
9. Sarah Boylston
2. Thomas Smith, of Nevis
10. Bernard Schenckingh
5. Elizabeth Schenckingh
11. Elizabeth Moore
1. Benjamin Smith
12. Thomas Smith; landgrave and governor of South Carolina
6. Thomas Smith II; landgrave and judge
13. Barbara Atkins
3. Sabina Smith (1699–1734)
14. Joseph Blake; governor of South Carolina
7. Sarah Blake
15.
