= Henry Woodward (colonist) =

Henry Woodward (c. 1646 – c. 1686), was a Barbados-born merchant and colonist who was one of the first white settlers in the Carolinas. He established relationships with many Native American Tribes in the American southeast. He initiated trade, primarily in deerskins and slaves, with many Indian towns and tribes.

== Early life ==
Not much is known about Henry Woodward's early life. He is thought to have been born in Barbados. His father was William Woodward and his mother was Esther Martin.

In 1666, Henry Woodward accompanied Captain Robert Sandford's exploration of the South Carolina coast. Woodward volunteered to remain in the Port Royal Sound vicinity and live among the Cusabo Indians, to establish relations and learn their language. For this he was granted, temporarily, "formal possession of the whole Country to hold as Tennant at Will" by the Lords Proprietors.

== Captured by Spanish ==
In 1667, Woodward was captured by the Spanish of Spanish Florida, taken to St. Augustine, Florida and held captive for about a year. As a prisoner he was well-treated. He professed Catholicism and was made official surgeon. During this time he learned about the thriving Spanish-Indian trading system. This experience helped him in rapidly establishing a trading system with local Native American after he regained his freedom.

Woodward escaped in 1668, after the English buccaneer and privateer Robert Searle raided St. Augustine. For about two years Woodward served as surgeon on privateer vessels in the Caribbean before being shipwrecked on Nevis in August 1669. He then took passage on the Carolina fleet of 1669–1670, which established Charleston, South Carolina. Henry Woodward became an interpreter and Indian agent for the fledgling colony. Starting in 1670, Woodward began taking a series of expeditions into the interior, making contact with various Indian groups. While a few Spanish expeditions had explored the interior of the American southeast in the sixteenth century, Woodward was the first Anglo-American colonist to do so. Notably, Woodward was the last European to visit the Cofitachequi in 1670 before it was disestablished.

== Westo and Shawnee ==
The Westo Indians were initially hostile to the new colony of South Carolina. In October 1674, some Westo Indians visited Woodward, who was widely known among the Indians, at St. Giles plantation on the head of the Ashley River. They requested he travel with them to their village (Hickauhaugau) on the Savannah River. During this visit Woodward initiated a trading relationship between Carolina and the Westo. While in Hickauhaugau Woodward witnessed the arrival of two Shawnee Indians. These Shawnee had probably migrated to the Apalachicola River region in the 1640s in order to trade with the Spanish and perhaps to escape the Iroquois wars in the north. Using sign language, the Shawnee warned the Westo of impending attack from the "Cussetaws, Checsaws, & Chiokees," earning the goodwill of the Westo. Later the Apalachicola Shawnee migrated to the Savannah River area, approached Henry Woodward privately and established a relationship that eventually doomed the Westo. These Shawnee became known in South Carolina as the "Savannah" Indians. When war broke out between the Westo and South Carolina in 1679, the Savannah Shawnee assisted South Carolina. By 1680, the Westo had been decimated and the Savannah Shawnee moved into their lands along the lower Savannah River.

In April 1677, South Carolina's Lords Proprietors, claiming a monopoly on Indian trade, forbade all trade with the Indians and the Spanish, except by their official agents. The destruction of the Westo left Woodward out of favor with the colony's Lords Proprietors. In 1682, Woodward got shot in the head but still manage to travel to England, where he not only obtained a pardon, but an official position as Indian agent for the Lords Proprietors. Woodward agreed to conduct the Indian trade for the proprietors in return for 20% of the profits.

== Stuarts Town and the Yamasee ==
A group of Scots founded a settlement, called Stuarts Town, in the Port Royal Sound area of South Carolina in 1684. The Scots of Stuarts Town and the English of Charles Town never got along. The Scots asserted their independence by initiating their own Indian trade, establishing a strong alliance with the powerful and newly arrived Yamasee Indians. In 1685, Henry Woodward found himself arrested in Stuarts Town while passing through the area on mission to the "proto-Creeks" of the Chattahoochee River. His arrest was apparently due to the desire of Lord Cardross of Stuarts Town to control trade with the Creek. Woodward was soon released and seems to have assisted the Stuarts Town Scots and their Yamasee Indian allies. Although part of the English Charles Town faction, Woodward may have been Scottish himself.

The Yamasee, backed by the Stuarts Town Scots, conducted a series of devastating raids on the Spanish mission province of Guale and then proceeded to invade the province of Timucua in Florida, bringing back many Indian slaves to sell to the Scots of Stuarts Town. Woodward, once back in Charles Town, was among those who loudly denounced the Stuarts Town settlement for these events. The Yamasee raids soon brought a Spanish counterattack that destroyed Stuarts Town. It is likely, however, that Woodward profited from the Yamasee raids, and even assisted. In denouncing the Scots he was probably taking the Charles Town side in the political dispute between Charles Town and Stuarts Town.

By 1684 the Spanish mission province of Guale was in ruins and generally abandoned.

== Introduction of rice ==
Woodward is generally credited with introduction of viable rice crops to the colonies stemming from his time in Charles Town in 1685. Pirate trader John Thurber returned from a trip to Madagascar with a bag of seed rice which he gave as a gift to Woodward, whose experiments showed that the marshy soil was ideal for rice cultivation.

== Trade with Chattahoochee River Indians ==
Starting perhaps as early as 1675, and definitely by the mid-1680s, Woodward was traveling to the southwest of modern Georgia, visiting the Indian towns along the lower Chattahoochee River such as Coweta and Cussita (later to be key towns of the Creek Nation). He led a dozen other Charles Town traders to the Chattahoochee Indians. These traders took over the business after Woodward's death.

During these trips Woodward discovered some Chickasaw Indians who had married into the Chattahoochee River "proto-Creek" groups. The ties between the Chickasaw and the proto-Creeks were fairly strong, which helped the English to discover a new market among the Chickasaw to the far west. Woodward was involved in this initial stage of English-Chickasaw relations, but he died before the first adventurous traders traveled to Chickasaw territory in the early 1690s.

The lower Chattahoochee River region had previously been contacted by Spain and was considered a potential mission province known as the Apalachicola Province. A visit by Woodward in 1685 sparked a Spanish reaction. Lieutenant Governor Antonio Matheos led a force of 6 Spanish soldiers and as many as 200 gun-toting Apalachee Indians from Mission San Luis de Apalachee in western Florida to the lower Chattahoochee towns. The English traders hid or fled. The following year, 1686, Matheos returned with a larger force, marching from town to town and confiscating firearms, deerskins, and other trade goods. Matheos offered the towns of "Apalachicola Province" the chance to submit to Spanish authority. Eight towns did so. The four that did not, including Coweta and Cussita, were burned to the ground. Following this, the four towns grudgingly pledged their obedience to Spain. Within years, English traders from South Carolina were again active among these towns, but, in 1690, Henry Woodward died in Charles Town.

== Legacy ==
Henry Woodward was an ancestor of numerous colonial figures, politicians and businesspeople in South Carolina. A significant part of the Charleston planter and merchant elite was descended from him. Among his descendants is Ursula von der Leyen.
