= Planter class =

Racial and socio-economic class of Pan-American society

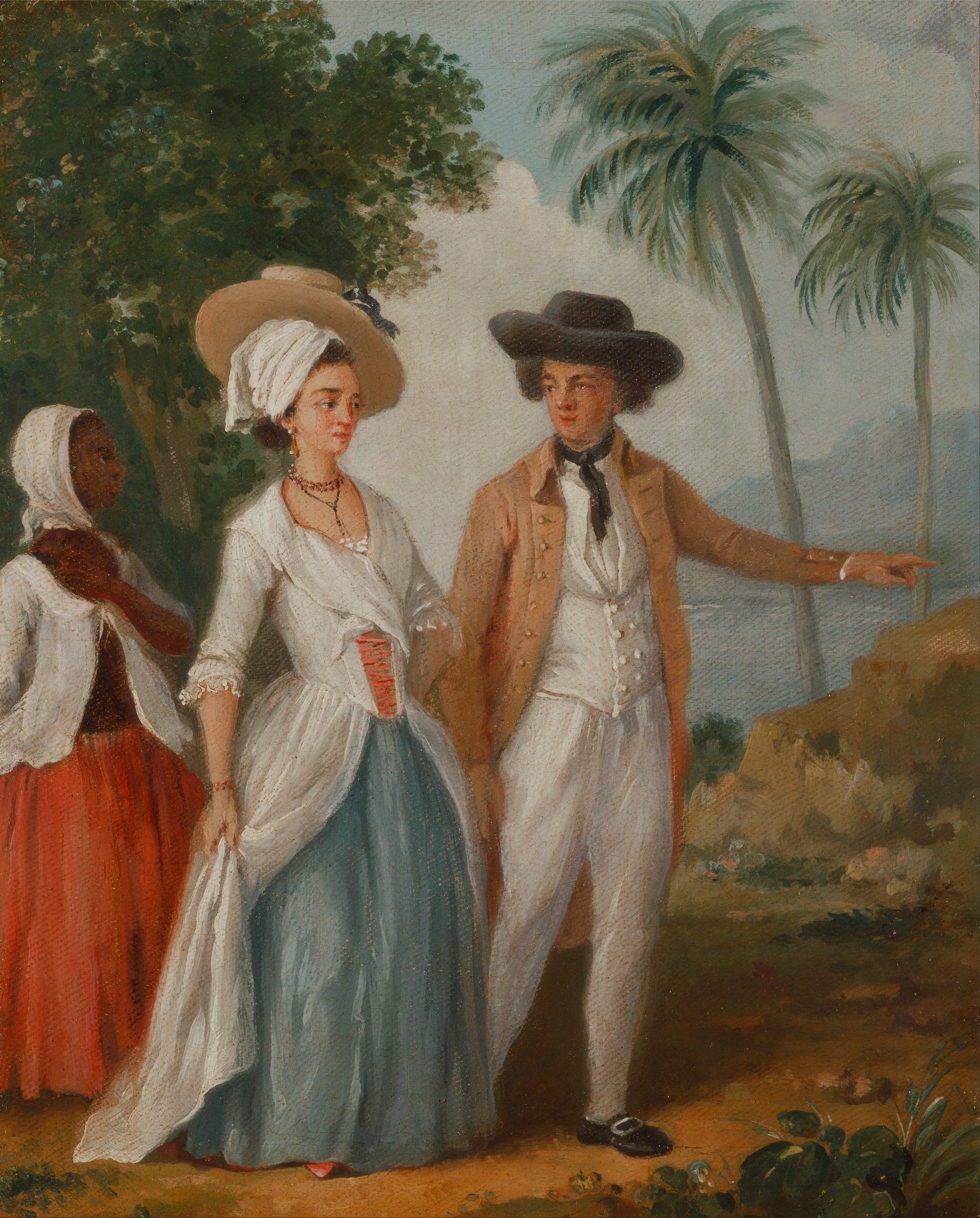
1780 painting of two members of the planter class with a woman they had enslaved

The planter class was a racial and socioeconomic class which emerged in the Americas during European colonization in the early modern period. Members of the class included settlers of European descent who owned or were financially connected to plantations, large-scale farms devoted to the production of cash crops in high demand across Europe and America. These plantations were often operated by the forced labor of slaves and indentured servants and typically existed in subtropical, tropical, and somewhat more temperate climates, where the soil was fertile enough to handle the intensity of plantation agriculture. Cash crops produced on plantations owned by the planter class included tobacco, sugarcane, cotton, indigo, coffee, tea, cocoa, sisal, oil seeds, oil palms, hemp, rubber trees, and fruits. In North America, the planter class formed part of the American gentry.

As European settlers began to colonize the Americas from the 15th century onwards, they quickly realized the economic potential of growing cash crops which were in high demand in Europe. Settlers began to establish plantations, the majority of which were located in the West Indies. Initially, these plantations were operated with the labor of indentured servants from Europe, but they were eventually supplanted by enslaved Africans brought to the Americas via the Atlantic slave trade. Colonial plantations eventually formed a key component of the triangular trade, whereby European goods were brought to Africa and exchanged for slaves, which were brought to the Americas to be sold to colonists, who used them to produce cash crops which were shipped back to Europe. Most African slaves brought to the Americas were sold to the planter class, where there are many documented examples of brutal mistreatment.

Beginning in the mid-18th century, the rise of abolitionism in Europe and the Americas led to a popular movement to abolish slavery in European colonies, which met with strong resistance from the planter class. Despite this, European nations gradually began to abolish their involvement in the slave trade and the institution of slavery itself during the late-18th and 19th centuries. Nations in the Americas followed suit, with Brazil being the last nation to abolish slavery in 1888. The abolition of slavery led to a rapid decline in the fortunes of the planter class, which responded in some areas by importing indentured servants from Asia. By the 20th century, the planter class ceased to be politically and socially influential in either the Americas or Europe. The exact reasons for the decline of the planter class and their role in the development of racial capitalism remain a strong point of contention among historians.

== History ==
=== Background ===
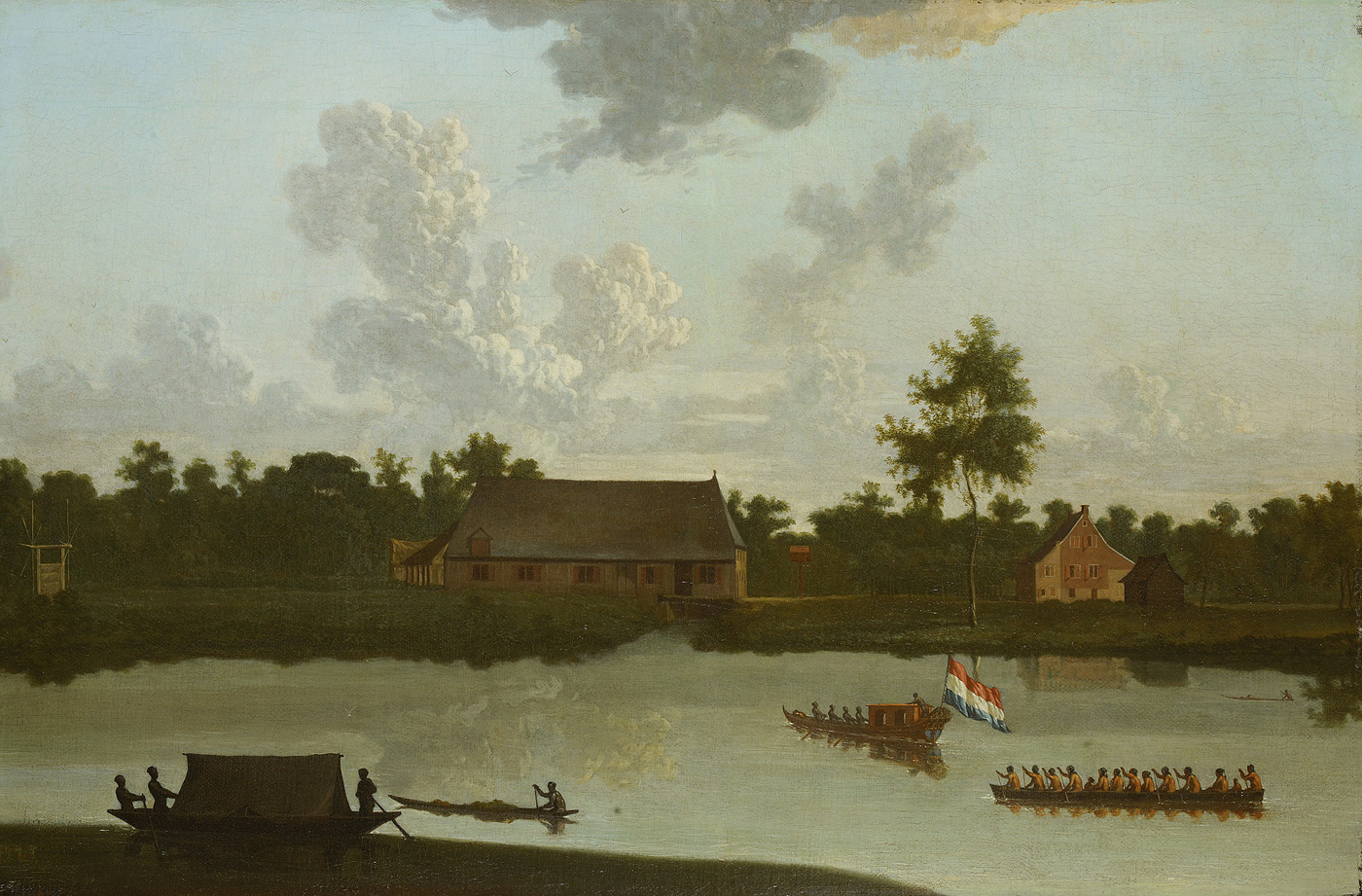
A painting of a sugar plantation in Surinam by Dirk Valkenburg

The search for gold and silver was a constant theme in overseas expansion, but there were other European demands that the New World could also satisfy, which contributed to its growing involvement in the Western-dominated world economy. While Spanish America seemed to fulfill dreams of mineral wealth, Brazil became the first major plantation colony in 1532, organized to produce a tropical crop, sugar, in great demand and short supply in Europe. The other major powers of Western Europe soon hoped to establish profitable colonies of their own. Presented with new opportunities, Europeans who were disenchanted by the rigid social structures of feudalism emigrated to the abundant uncultivated lands of the colonial frontier.

Arriving in the late 16th and the early 17th centuries, settlers landed on the shores of an unspoiled and hostile countryside. Early planters first began as colony farmers providing for the needs of settlements besieged by famine, disease, and tribal raids. Native Americans friendly to the colonists taught them to cultivate native plant species, including tobacco and fruits, which, within a century, would become a global industry itself that funded a multinational slave trade. Colonial politics would come to be dominated by wealthy noble landowners interested in commercial development. In an effort to reduce the financial burden of continental wars, European governments began instituting land pension systems by which a soldier, typically an officer, would be granted land in the colonies for services rendered. That incentivized military professionals to settle in the Americas and thus contribute to colonial defense against foreign colonists and hostile Natives.

=== Rise of plantation economy ===
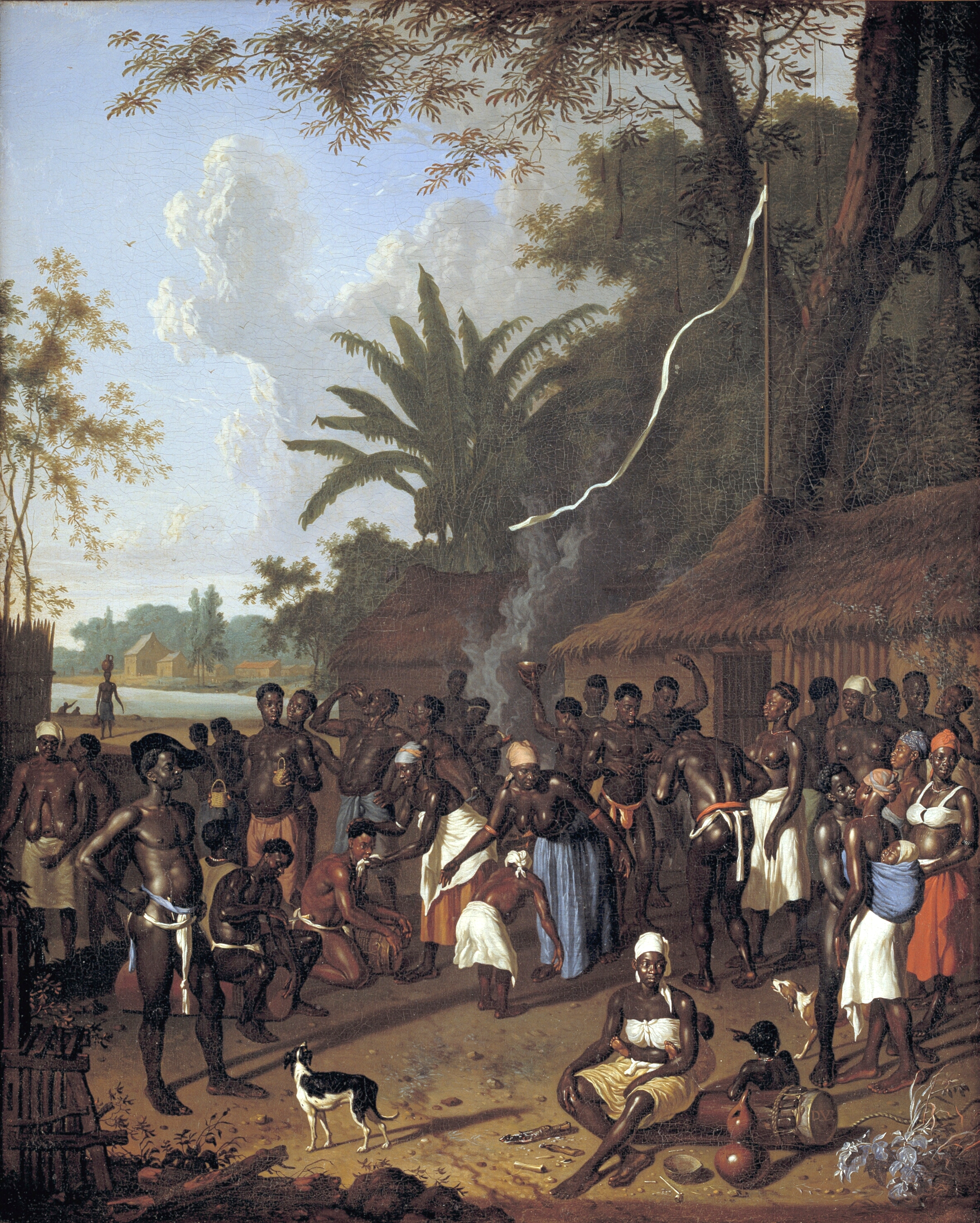
A social event held by slaves in Surinam

John Rolfe, a settler from Jamestown, was the first colonist to grow tobacco in North America. He arrived in Virginia with tobacco seeds procured from an earlier voyage to Trinidad, and in 1612, he harvested his inaugural crop for sale on the European market. In the 17th century, the Chesapeake Bay area was immensely hospitable to tobacco cultivation. Ships annually hauled 1.5 million lb (680,000 kg) of tobacco out to the Bay by the 1630s and about 40 million lb (18 million kg) by the end of the century. Tobacco planters financed their operations with loans from London. When tobacco prices dropped precipitously in the 1750s, many plantations struggled to remain financially solvent. In an effort to combat financial ruin, planters pushed to increase crop yield or, with the depletion of soil nutrients, converted to growing other crops such as cotton or wheat.

In 1720, coffee was first introduced to the West Indies by French naval officer Gabriel de Clieu, who procured a coffee plant seedling from the Royal Botanical Gardens in Paris and transported it to Martinique. He transplanted it on the slopes of Mount Pelée and was able to harvest his first crop in 1726, or shortly thereafter. Within 50 years, there were 18,000 coffee trees in Martinique, enabling the spread of coffee cultivation to Saint-Domingue, New Spain, and other islands of the Caribbean. The French territory of Saint-Domingue began cultivating coffee in 1734, and by 1788, it supplied half the global market. The French colonial plantations relied heavily on African slave laborers. However, the harsh conditions that slaves endured on coffee plantations precipitated the Haitian Revolution. Coffee had a major influence on the geography of Latin America.

=== Revolution and abolitionism ===
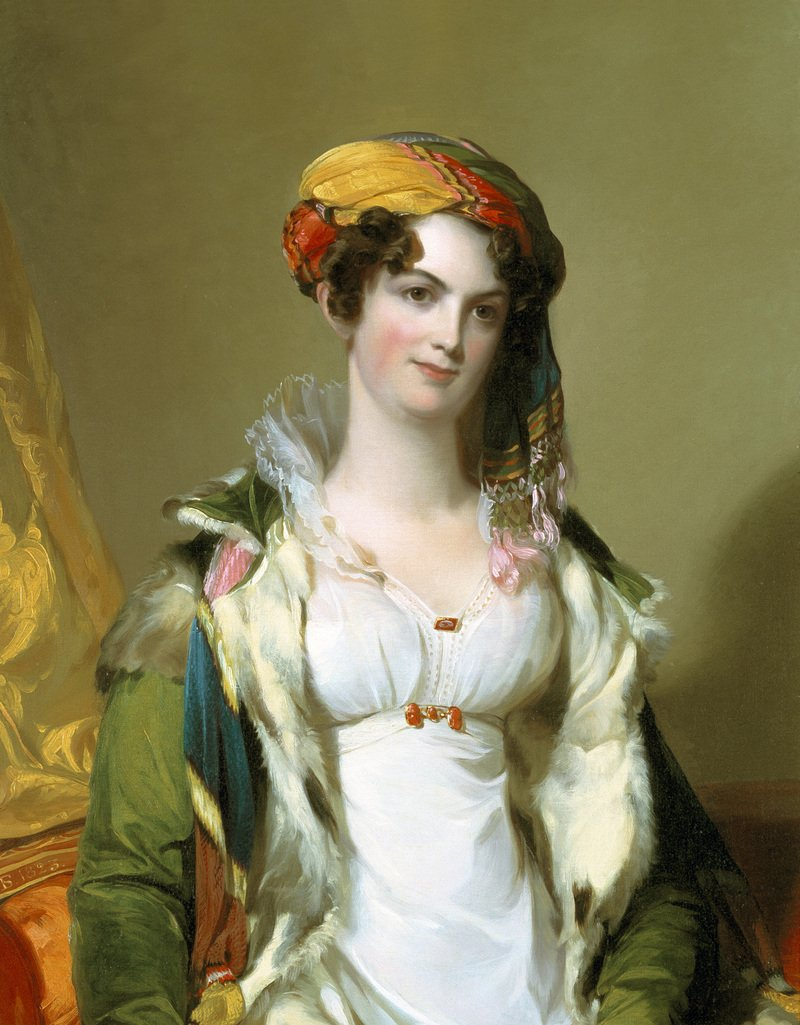
Sarah Reeve Ladson, an influential member of the South Carolina planter class.

An age of enlightenment dominated the world of ideas in Europe during the 18th century. Philosophers began writing pamphlets against slavery and its moral and economic justifications, including Montesquieu in The Spirit of the Laws (1748) and Denis Diderot in the Encyclopédie. The laws governing slavery in the French West Indies, the Code Noir of Louis XIV, granted unparalleled rights for slaves to marry, gather publicly, and abstain from work on Sundays. It forbade slave owners to torture or to separate families; though corporal punishment was sanctioned, masters who killed their slaves or falsely accused a slave of a crime and had the slave put to death would be fined. Masters openly and consistently broke the Code and passed local legislation that reversed its less desirable articles.

The Enlightenment writer Guillaume Raynal attacked slavery in the 1780 edition of his history of European colonization. He also predicted a general slave revolt in the colonies by saying that there were signs of "the impending storm." Sugar production in Saint-Domingue was sustained under especially harsh conditions, including the humid climate of the Caribbean, where diseases such as malaria and yellow fever caused high mortality. White planters and their families, together with the merchants and shopkeepers, lived in fear of slave rebellion. Thus, in the functions of society and efforts to combat dissent, cruelty was noted in the form of overwork, inadequate food and shelter, insufficient clothing and medical care, rape, lashings, castration and burnings.

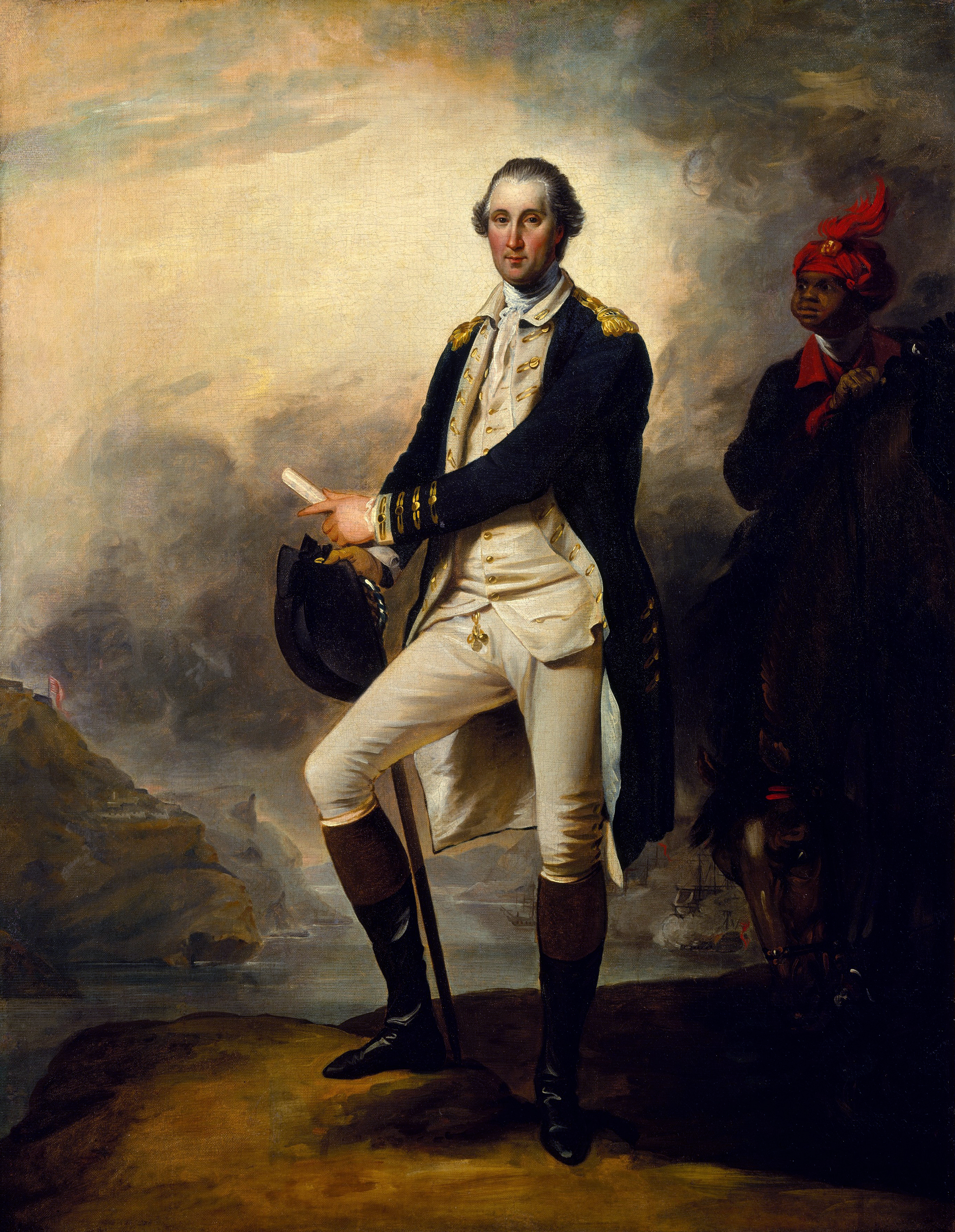
George Washington, member of the Virginia planter class, depicted in a 1780 portrait with his enslaved personal servant William Lee in the background.

Some Runaway slaves, lived as Maroons, hiding in the jungles and living off the land and what could be stolen in violent raids on the island's sugar and coffee plantations. Although the numbers in the bands grew large (sometimes into the thousands), they generally lacked the leadership and strategy to accomplish large-scale objectives. In April 1791, a massive slave insurgency rose violently against the plantation system, setting a precedent of resistance to slavery. In 1793, George Washington, owner of the Mount Vernon plantation, signed into law the first Fugitive Slave Act, guaranteeing a right for a slave master to recover an escaped slave.

On 4 February 1794, during the French Revolution, the National Assembly of the First Republic abolished slavery in France and its colonies. The military successes of the French Republic and of Napoleon Bonaparte carried across Europe the ideals of egalitarianism and brought into question the practice of slavery in the colonies of other European powers. In Britain, a fledgling abolitionist movement received a major boost after the 1772 Somerset v Stewart court case, which affirmed that English common law did not uphold the legality of slavery. Eleven years later in 1783, a group of Britons, many of them Quakers, founded an abolitionist organisation in London. William Wilberforce led the cause of abolition through his campaign in the Parliament of Great Britain. His efforts finally abolished the slave trade in the British Empire with the 1807 Slave Trade Act. He continued to campaign for the abolition of slavery in the British Empire, which he did not see, with the 1833 Slavery Abolition Act receiving Royal Assent the week after his death, in July 1833.

== Architecture ==
A plantation house served to group the owner's family, guests, and house slaves within one large structure in a central location on the estate. Often starting as a modest abode, the house was enlarged or replaced with a newer, more impressive home as the planter's wealth grew. Commonly seen is the addition of massive Greek Revival columns, curved stairs, semi-detached wings, and other architectural elements popular at the time.

=== French colonial ===
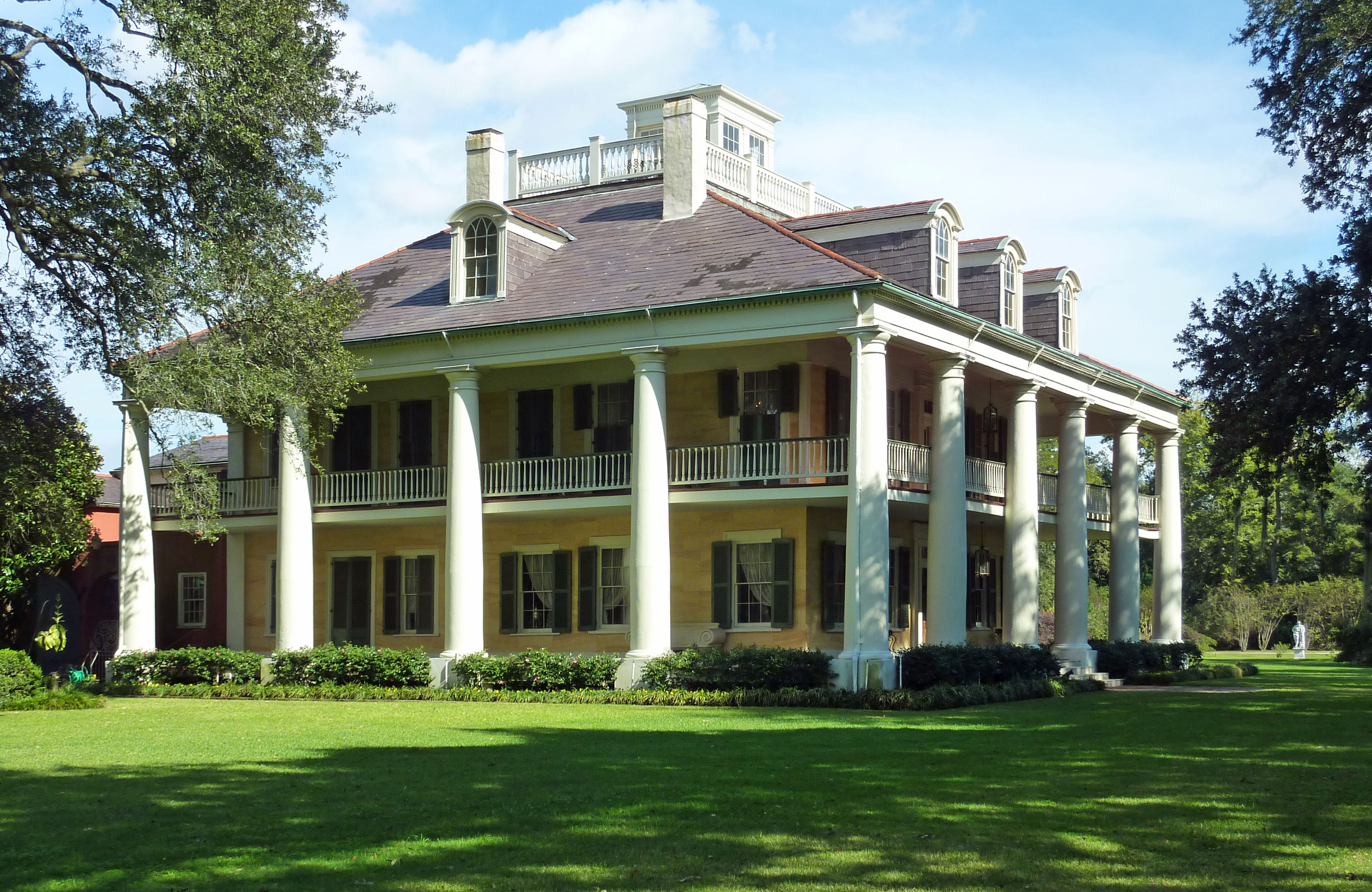
The Houmas, a plantation near Darrow, Louisiana

The French origins of planters in Canada, Louisiana, and Saint-Domingue heavily influenced the development of French colonial architecture, characterized by its wide hipped roofs extending over wraparound porches, thin wooden columns, and living quarters raised above ground level. Learning building practices from the West Indies, colonists designed practical dwellings for a territory prone to flooding. A notable loss of plantation homes in Louisiana is attributed to an economic shift from agriculture to industry during the Reconstruction era.

=== Georgian ===
Georgian architecture was widely disseminated in the Thirteen Colonies during the Georgian era. American buildings of the Georgian period were very often constructed of wood with clapboards; even columns were made of timber, framed up, and turned on an oversized lathe. At the start of the period, the difficulties of obtaining and transporting brick or stone made them a common alternative only in the larger cities or where they were obtainable locally. A premier example of Georgian planter architecture is Westover Plantation, built in the mid-18th century as the residence of William Byrd III, the son of the founder of the Richmond, Virginia. An elaborate doorway, which is recognized as "the Westover doorway," adorns the main entrance and contrasts an otherwise simple construction.

During the American Civil War, the house served as the headquarters of Union General Fitz John Porter, the protégé of George McClellan, who was stationed at nearby Berkeley Plantation, and purportedly had its east wing struck by a Confederate cannonball fired from the south side of the James River. The wing caught fire and lay in ruin until Mrs. Clarise Sears Ramsey, a Byrd descendant, purchased the property in 1899. She was instrumental in modernizing the house, rebuilding the east wing, and adding hyphens to connect the main house to the previously separate dependencies, thereby creating one long building.

=== Palladian ===
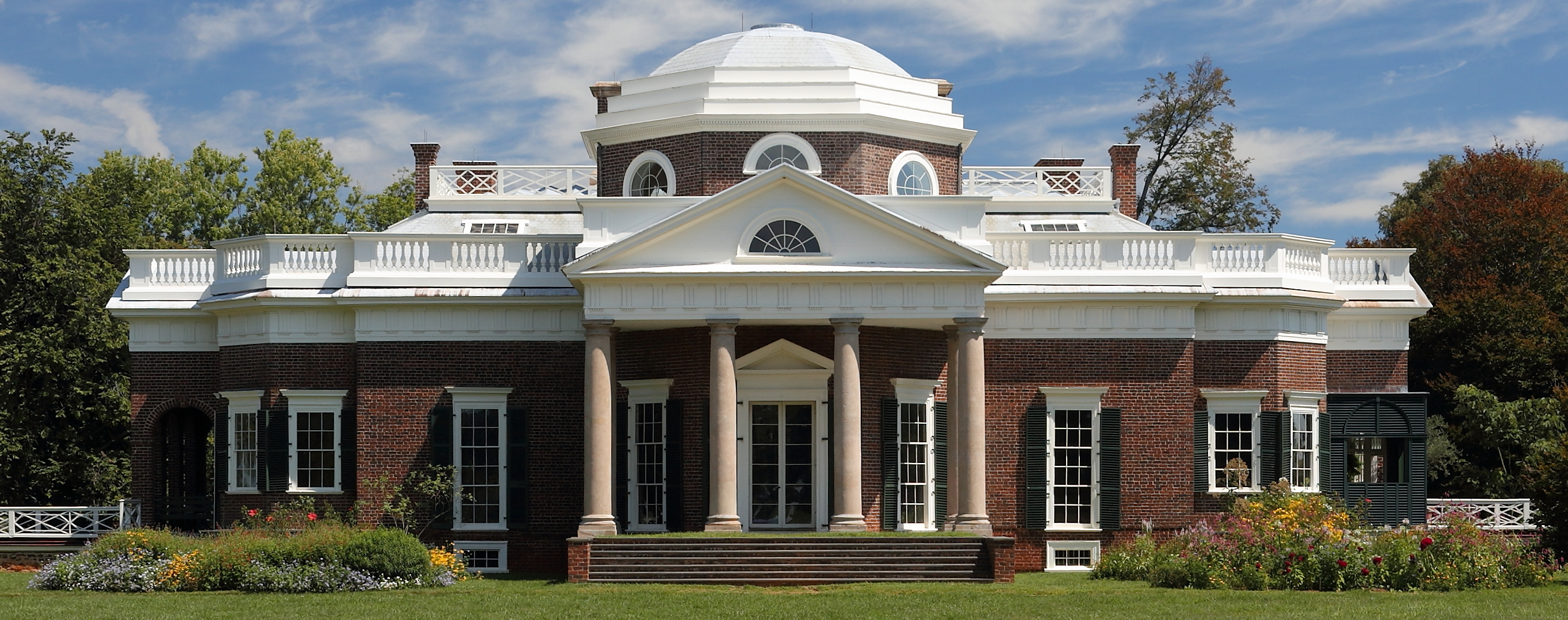
Monticello, the primary plantation of Thomas Jefferson

Andrea Palladio developed Palladianism in the 16th century, publishing in 1570 Quattro Libri, a treatise on architecture in four volumes and illustrated with woodcuts after Palladio's own drawings. Introduced to the American continent by George Berkeley in the 1720s, Palladian architecture became popular with American society in the construction of colleges and public buildings, while many houses too were built in the Jefferson Palladian style of Monticello.

Covered and columned porches feature prominently in Palladian architecture, in many cases dominating the main facade. Red brick exteriors and either slanted or domed roofs are commonplace among residential buildings. Monticello, residence of US President Thomas Jefferson, was built in a style unique to him that has been emulated in the construction of many colleges, such as the Rotunda of the University of Virginia, as well as churches, courthouses, concert halls, and military schools.

== See also ==
- Colonial families of Maryland
- First Families of Virginia
  - Ancient planter
- Plantation complexes in the Southern United States

== Bibliography ==
- Brandt, Allan (2007). The Cigarette Century: The Rise, Fall, and Deadly Persistence of the Product That Defined America. New York: Basic Books. ISBN 9780465070473.
