= List of parks in Charleston, South Carolina =

The first Board of Park Commissioners in Charleston, South Carolina, United States, was formed in 1895. The City of Charleston's Grounds Maintenance Division takes care of public green spaces. The Charleston Parks Conservancy is a non-profit working to renovate and improve the city's parks. The Charleston Horticultural Society is active in promoting the quality of the city's gardens.

== List of parks ==
- Allan Park (Charleston)
- Bees Landing Recreation Center
- Brittlebank Park
- Cannon Park (Charleston, SC)
- Charles Towne Landing
- Chapel St. Fountain Park
- Colonial Lake (Charleston, SC)
- Concord Park (Charleston)
- Corrine Jones Playground
- Demetre Park
- Elliotborough Park and Community Garden
- Etiwan Park
- Hampstead Mall
- Hampton Park (Charleston)
- Harmon Park
- Hazel Parker Playground
- Logan St. Triangle Park
- Lenevar Park
- Marion Square
- Martin Park
- Mary Utsey Park
- Mcmahon playground
- Mitchell Playground
- Moultrie Playground
- Northbridge Park
- Parkshore Park
- St. Julian Devine Community Center
- The Battery (Charleston)
- Tiedemann Park and Nature Center
- Theodora Park
- Vivian Anderson Moultrie Playground
- Washington Square (Charleston)
- Waterfront Park (Charleston)
- West Ashley Park
- White Point Garden
