= Allan Park =

Allan Park can refer to:

- Allan Park, Aberdeen, former football ground of Cove Rangers F.C.
- Allan Park (Charleston)
- Allan Park, Ontario
