= Arthur B. Schirmer Jr. =

American politician

Arthur Bonnell Schirmer Jr.

59th Mayor of Charleston
- In office August 19, 1975 – December 15, 1975
- Preceded by: J. Palmer Gaillard Jr.
- Succeeded by: Joseph P. Riley Jr.

Personal details
- Born: February 24, 1933
- Died: April 6, 2008 (aged 75)
- Profession: president of Landscaping Pavers Ltd.

Arthur Bonnell Schirmer Jr. was the fifty-ninth mayor of Charleston, South Carolina, completing the final four months of J. Palmer Gaillard, after Gaillard's resignation. He did not run for election for a full term.

Schirmer was born on February 24, 1933, and died on July 17, 2008; he is buried at Magnolia Cemetery.

Schirmer was sworn in on August 19, 1975. Although Schirmer served for only four months, he did not want to be thought of as a mere interim mayor, once saying, "When my accomplishments are considered, people will realize that I have been anything but an interim mayor." During his brief tenure, he directed the city to begin sharing its pools with the school district and also began planning for the sale of the municipal airport. His mayorship ended on December 15, 1975, with the inauguration of Joseph P. Riley Jr. At that time, he returned to his job running paving and landscaping companies and operating a limestone quarry.

Schirmer was raised in downtown Charleston on Bull Street, but during his time in office, he lived in West Ashley, making him one of the few mayors of Charleston to have lived there. A set of tennis courts at Bees Landing Recreation Center is named in his honor.

Political offices
Preceded by J. Palmer Gaillard Jr.	Mayor of Charleston, South Carolina; 1975	Succeeded by Joseph P. Riley Jr.
