= J. Palmer Gaillard Jr. =

American politician

John P. Gaillard Jr.

58th Mayor of Charleston, South Carolina
- In office 1959–1975
- Preceded by: William McG. Morrison
- Succeeded by: Arthur B. Schirmer Jr.

Personal details
- Born: April 4, 1920 Charleston, South Carolina, U.S.
- Died: July 28, 2006 (aged 86) Charleston, South Carolina, U.S.
- Party: Democratic
- Spouse: Lucy Foster (m. 1944; died 2001)
- Children: 3
- Profession: Aviator

John Palmer Gaillard Jr. (April 4, 1920 – July 28, 2006) was an American politician who was mayor of Charleston, South Carolina from 1959 to 1975. The Gaillard Center is named after him. During his tenure, Gaillard significantly expanded the size of Charleston by annexing nearby neighborhoods.

== Early life and mayorship ==
John Gaillard was born on Easter Sunday, April 4, 1920, in Charleston to J. Palmer Gaillard and Eleanor Lucas Gaillard. After his education, he enlisted in the United States Navy, two days after the attack on Pearl Harbor. He served as a pilot for four years and was later discharged as a lieutenant in November 1945.

Upon his return to Charleston, he founded the Seaboard Lumber & Supply Co. in 1946 and In 1951 he was elected to the Charleston City Council. He was re-elected in 1955 and served until 1959 when he was elected the Mayor of Charleston. Gaillard was re-elected three times and served until 1975.

During his administration, the city expanded its boundaries for the first time since 1849, more than doubling in size during his time in office by taking control of land in West Ashley. In 1962, Gaillard took part in local efforts to change I-95's planned route further away from Florence and closer to Charleston.

Gaillard also endorsed St. Julian Devine for a seat on the city council which Devine won, making him the first African American to hold a seat on the council since Reconstruction.

== Later life ==
In 1975, he was named Deputy Assistant Secretary of the Navy for Reserve Affairs by President Gerald Ford. He announced his resignation as mayor on April 24, 1975, upon his nomination to the federal post by Sen. Strom Thurmond; at his final City Council meeting, the civic auditorium was renamed in his honor as the Gaillard Municipal Auditorium. In 1977, Gaillard returned to Charleston and assumed the vice presidency of contracting firm Ruscon Corporation, a position he retained until his retirement in 1985.

He died on July 28, 2006, in Charleston, South Carolina, when he accidentally pulled his car out in front of an on-coming truck; the truck driver was not charged.

Political offices
Preceded by William McG. Morrison	Mayor of Charleston, South Carolina; 1959–1975	Succeeded by Arthur B. Schirmer Jr.
