= Faber House =

United States historic place

- U.S. National Register of Historic Places
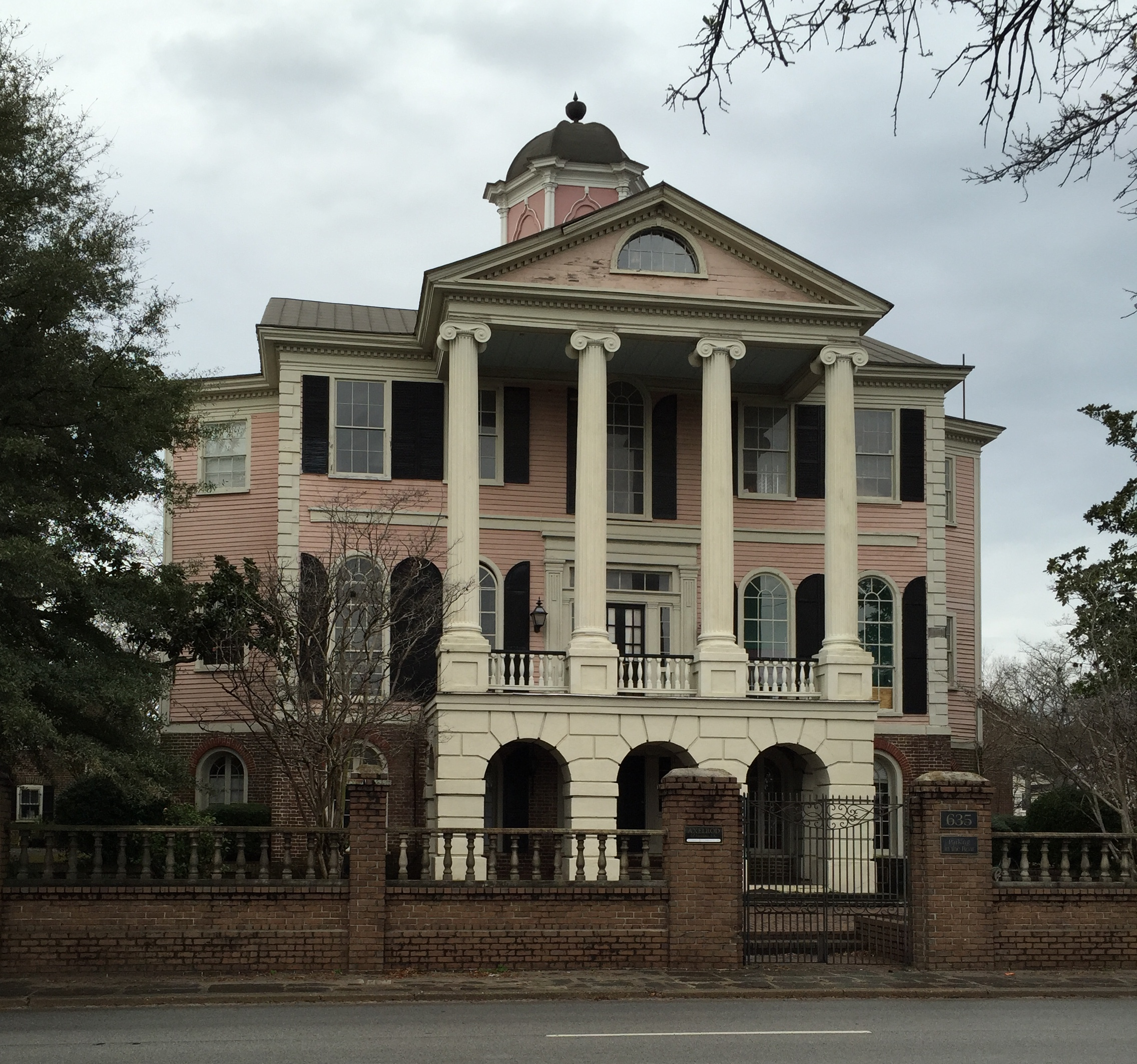

- Location within South Carolina Location within the United States
- Location: 635 East Bay Street, Charleston, South Carolina
- Coordinates: 32°47′43″N 79°55′59″W
- Area: 1 acre (0.40 ha)
- Built: 1839
- NRHP reference No.: 100003689
- Added to NRHP: April 30, 2019

The Faber House is a historic building in Hampstead Village in Charleston, South Carolina that was listed on the National Register of Historic Places in 2019.

== History ==
The name of the Faber House refers both to Henry F. Faber, who started the construction of the house, as well as his brother Joseph W. Faber, who finished the house. The brothers had jointly bought an entire block with the plans of splitting the land and building two houses for themselves. The Faber House—on the half of the block to be used by Henry Faber—had not been completed when he died in 1839, and his widow sold it to her brother-in-law, Joseph W. Faber.

The house had fallen into serious disrepair by the 1960s. In 1964, a municipal low-income housing project was slated for the site and the surrounding area; the house would have been demolished and replaced with several dozen housing units. The housing would have especially been used to relocate families that had been displaced by the construction of I-26 through the peninsula. A proposal to relocate the headquarters of the State Ports Authority to the house was rejected in October 1965; among other concerns, the SPA would have to have built additional offices on the rear of the property. The Historic Charleston Foundation acquired the house to restore it and hold until a preservation-minded buyer could be found. The Foundation hired Herbert DaCosta, Jr. to perform a partial restoration of some features and a stabilization of the house. The repair work began in February 1966.

On the night of June 23, 1969, the house suffered fire damage when a street flare was taken from a nearby road construction project and thrown through a first floor window; Charleston was experiencing widespread civil unrest at the time with racial protests occurring at several locations and several reports of vandalism.

The Arthur Ravenel Co., a real estate firm, bought the house and its one-acre lot in 1971 from the Historic Charleston Foundation with plans to restore the house, use the ground floor as offices, convert the upper floors to two apartments, and convert the detached dependencies to residences too.

== Architecture ==
The Faber House exemplifies Palladian design. A notable feature is the two-story portico with four Ionic columns set on a 15-foot ground floor with arches. Atop the house is a cupola with a finial; the original finial was struck by lightning in 1973 but replicated.
