= Joseph P. Riley Jr. =

American politician

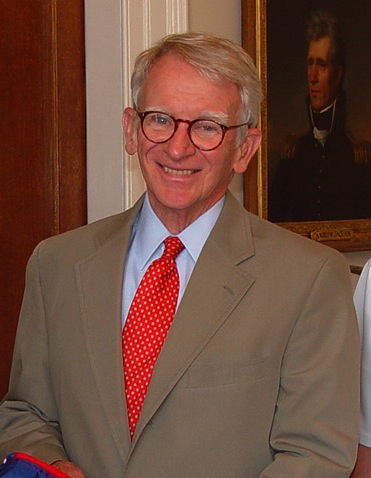
- Riley in 2010

60th Mayor of Charleston
- In office December 15, 1975 – January 11, 2016
- Preceded by: Arthur B. Schirmer Jr.
- Succeeded by: John Tecklenburg

44th President of the United States Conference of Mayors
- In office 1986–1987
- Preceded by: Ernest Morial
- Succeeded by: Richard Berkley

Member of the South Carolina House of Representatives from Charleston County
- In office 1968–1974

Personal details
- Born: Joseph Patrick Riley Jr. January 19, 1943 (age 83) Charleston, South Carolina, U.S.
- Party: Democratic
- Spouse: Charlotte
- Children: Joe; Bratton
- Education: The Citadel (BA); University of South Carolina, Columbia (JD)

Joseph Patrick Riley Jr. (born January 19, 1943) is an American politician who served as the 60th mayor of Charleston, South Carolina from 1975 to 2016. A member of the Democratic Party, he also served in the South Carolina House of Representatives from 1968 to 1974 and was the 44th President of the United States Conference of Mayors from 1986 to 1987. Riley's 40 years as mayor were the longest in South Carolina history at the time of his retirement and are the longest in Charleston's history.

== Early life ==
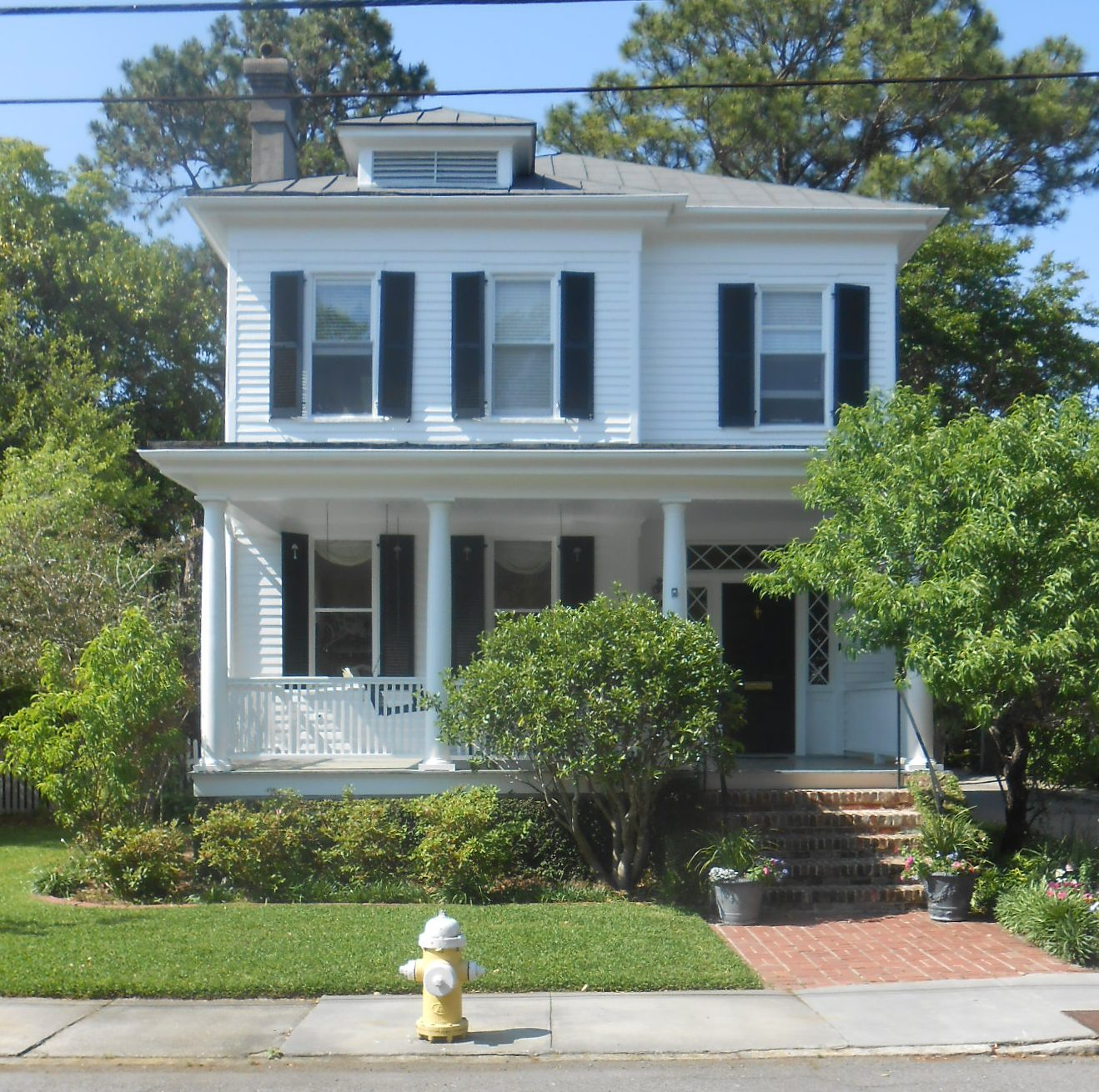
The home of Mayor Joseph P. Riley Jr.

Riley was born in Charleston, South Carolina. He graduated from The Citadel in 1964 and the University of South Carolina School of Law in 1967. As a member of the Democratic Party, he served in the South Carolina House of Representatives from 1968 to 1974.

== Mayor of Charleston ==
In December 1975, Riley was elected the mayor of Charleston, becoming the second Irish Catholic to hold the position. He served for 10 terms. Riley was elected to his seventh term on November 2, 1999, with 71% of the vote; city councilman Maurice Washington received 29%. Riley won his eighth term as mayor in November 2003 in the city's first nonpartisan election with 57% of the vote against other candidates including Jimmy Bailey (32%) and Kwadjo Campbell (9%).

When the Confederate battle flag was flown above the South Carolina State House, Riley organized a five-day protest walk from Charleston to Columbia to promote its removal. The march began on April 2, 2000, with about 600 marchers; the crowd dropped dramatically during the week, but rebounded to about 400 marchers before a protest held on the statehouse grounds on April 6, 2000. The Confederate flag was removed from the South Carolina State House on July 10, 2015, in the aftermath of the Charleston church shooting.

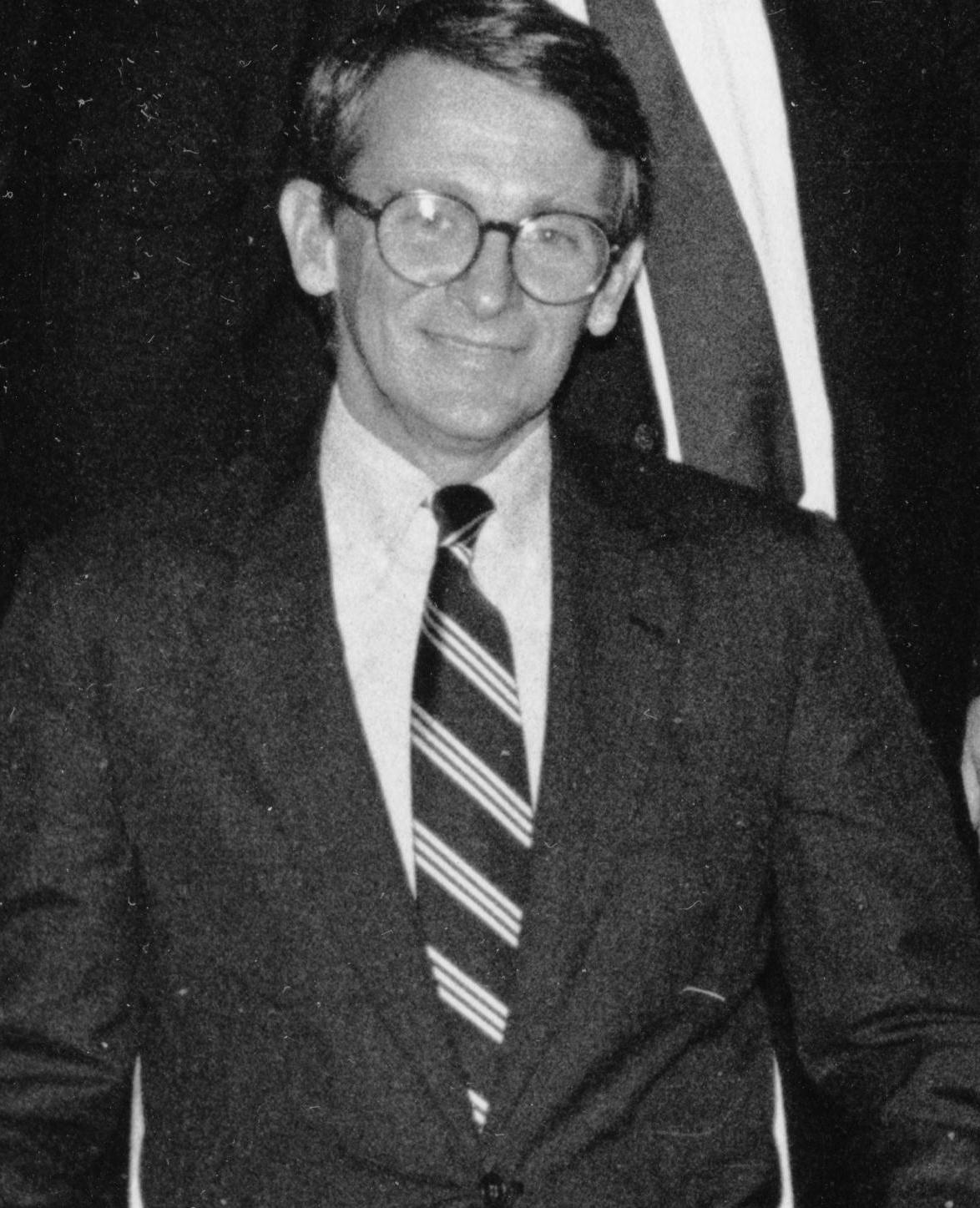
Riley in 1985

=== Development ===
==== Annexations ====
During Riley's tenure, the city of Charleston annexed vast swathes of land, often parcel by parcel. The most controversial annexation was that of Daniel Island in 1990. Riley's critics for the annexation compared him to Saddam Hussein. The city was able to annex Daniel Island despite the wishes of the Guggenheim Foundation which owned the island by annexing it alongside smaller but more valuable properties which offset the foundation's opposition. Other annexations during Riley's tenure include Cainhoy Plantation, Long Savannah on Bees Ferry Road, and the Neck Area below North Charleston.

==== Charleston Place ====
Riley's first major project was pushing the redevelopment of the central business district. City Council approved $12,500 for a feasibility study for a redevelopment plan on June 7, 1977. A Washington, D.C. consulting group recommended that the city should build a large hotel, commercial, and conference center, and the largely vacant 5-acre lot bounded by King, Meeting, Hasell, and Market streets was a prime candidate. In mid-1977, developer Theodore Gould made a proposal for a $40 million project to be known as the "Charleston Center." The conceptual plans called for a 14-story building with a 700-car parking garage, and preservationists came out strongly against the plans. On January 25, 1978, the first of several lawsuits was filed in an effort to scale back the massive size of the project. Work began in 1981 after several legal challenges. On May 16, 1983, revised plans were released showing the building as it would eventually appear: eight stories in the center but only four around the perimeter. When Gould was unable to secure financing, the city replaced him with new backers and renamed the project "Charleston Place." The center opened on September 2, 1986. Its final cost was approximately $75 million.

==== Other development projects ====
In 1987, Riley supported several projects meant to spur redevelopment, including a visitor center on upper Meeting Street and the Waterfront Park along the Cooper River. Riley had a deal with a landowner allowing the city to purchase the land for Waterfront Park for $2.5 million. The land was estimated to be worth between $3.3 and $3.75 million.

In 1989, Riley served on the selection committee for the Rudy Bruner Award for Urban Excellence.

Riley's legacy project, which he describes as his "most important work" as mayor, is the International African American Museum. Located on the former Gadsden's Wharf – the site where over 40% of all enslaved Africans brought to this country took their first steps – the museum is a $75MM project with world-class partners Ralph Applebaum & Associates and Pei Cobb Freed. Construction began in January 2020.

=== Charleston Sofa Super Store fire ===
In 2007, the Sofa Super Store fire killed nine Charleston firemen after the roof of the building fell in. In response, Riley created a panel of outside experts to investigate the incident. The panel compiled a list of needed reforms to the fire department a week later. In the aftermath, the International Association of Fire Fighters criticized Riley for being "anti-labor" and for failing to follow the National Incident Management System despite Governor Mark Sanford previously issuing an executive order to do so.

Under Riley's management, the city of Charleston purchased the land where the Sofa Super Store once stood and made it a passive park. Riley also controversially proposed making the Long Savannah Project, a county park currently being developed, as a memorial park.

=== Social issues and climate change ===
==== Mother Emanuel Church shooting ====
Riley was mayor of Charleston on June 17, 2015, when the city experienced its deadliest mass shooting, known as the Charleston church shooting. Riley was friends with several of the victims, including state senator Clementa C. Pinckney and arrived at the scene shortly after being called by the police chief. In the wake of the shooting, Riley stated that "nine beautiful, loving people in a meeting about prayer and their religion were killed by a maniac" and that the country didn't "let bad people like this get away with these dastardly deeds." He also called for stricter gun control laws, stating that "there are far too many guns out there, and access to guns, it's far too easy. Our society has not been able to deal with that yet.”

==== Sea level rise ====
Over the decades that he served as mayor, many extreme weather events such as hurricanes flooded the city, and these flood events increased over time as a result of global warming and sea level rise. Riley worked to implement flood management programs, and released a Sea Level Rise Strategy just before leaving the office.

== Other ventures ==
From 1986 to 1987, Riley served as president of the U.S. Conference of Mayors and on its executive committee. He founded the Mayors' Institute on City Design. In 1994, Riley ran for Governor of South Carolina. He finished second in the Democratic primary behind Lieutenant Governor Nick Theodore.

Riley is a member of the Mayors Against Illegal Guns Coalition, a bi-partisan group with a stated goal of "making the public safer by getting illegal guns off the streets". The coalition was co-founded by former Boston Mayor Thomas Menino and former New York City mayor Michael Bloomberg. He is also on the board of selectors of Jefferson Awards for Public Service.

== Awards and recognition ==
- Outstanding Mayors Award by the National Urban Coalition (1983)
- Distinguished Citizen Award by the National Association of Realtors
- South Carolina's Order of the Palmetto
- South Carolinian of the Year
- Verner Award by the South Carolina Arts Commission (1982)
- Municipal Leader of the Year by American City & County (1991)
- Thomas Jefferson Award from the American Institute of Architects for Public Architecture (1994)
- Seaside Prize from the Seaside Institute (1997)
- President's Award from the U. S. Conference of Mayors, for outstanding leadership (2000)
- Urban Land Institute J. C. Nichols Prize for Visionary Urban Development (2000)
- One of the twenty-five most dynamic mayors in America, Newsweek Magazine (1996)
- Recipient of The National Medal of Arts (2009) – Presented by President Barack Obama

== See also ==
- Timeline of Charleston, South Carolina

== Sources ==
- Reagan Archives - Appointment of Two Members of the US Advisory Commission on Intergovernmental Relations, January 16, 1985

Political offices
Preceded by Arthur B. Schirmer Jr.	Mayor of Charleston, South Carolina; 1975–2016	Succeeded by John Tecklenburg
