= Hampstead Village (Charleston, South Carolina) =

Neighbourhood in Charleston, South Carolina, United States

Coordinates: 32.795°N 79.935°W

Hampstead Village is a neighborhood in Charleston, South Carolina in the US, also known as the Eastside or the East Side.

A prominent merchant, Henry Laurens, bought several tracts totaling 99 acres where Hampstead Village is today. He began acquiring the land in 1769 with a purchase of land from George Austin, and then he added nearby parcels.

Laurens had his holdings platted on an English model, with Mary St. to the south (bordering Wraggborough), the edge of the Cooper River to the east, King St. to the west, and an unnamed creek near present-day Cooper St. to the north. Advertisements for lots in 1769 included mentions of a central square to be planned out by the first 21 buyers; that square was created and is today known as Hampstead Mall. Sales were lackluster: he sold only 68 of the 140 lots within the first 21 months. Most of even those lots were sold to Laurens's business partner, Wiliam Bampfield.

The Revolutionary War also slowed the development of the new neighborhood. In May 1779, South Carolina governor John Rutledge ordered that the new houses be razed because they blocked the view of the City's defenders of the British forces to the north.

== Gallery ==
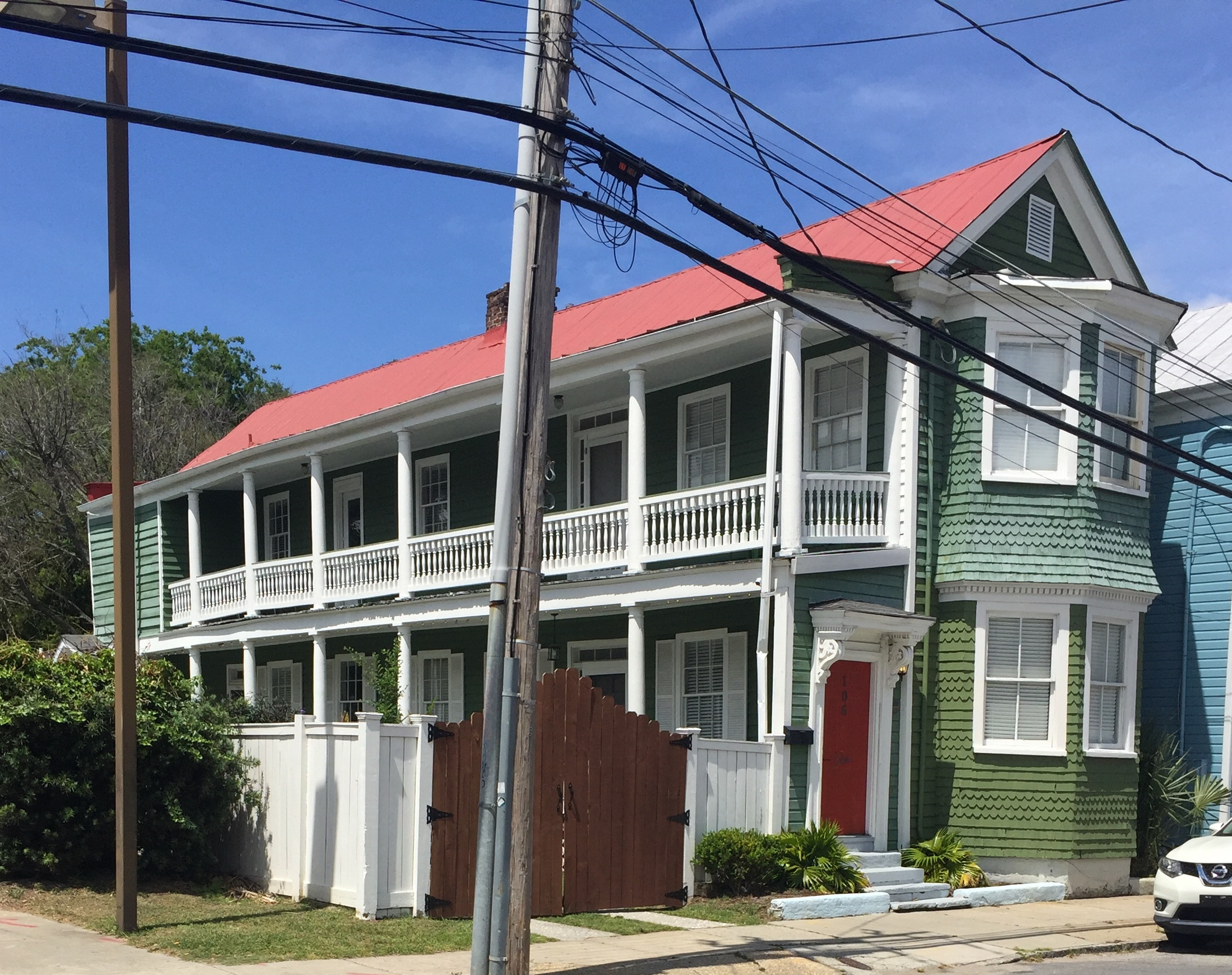
106 Columbus St.

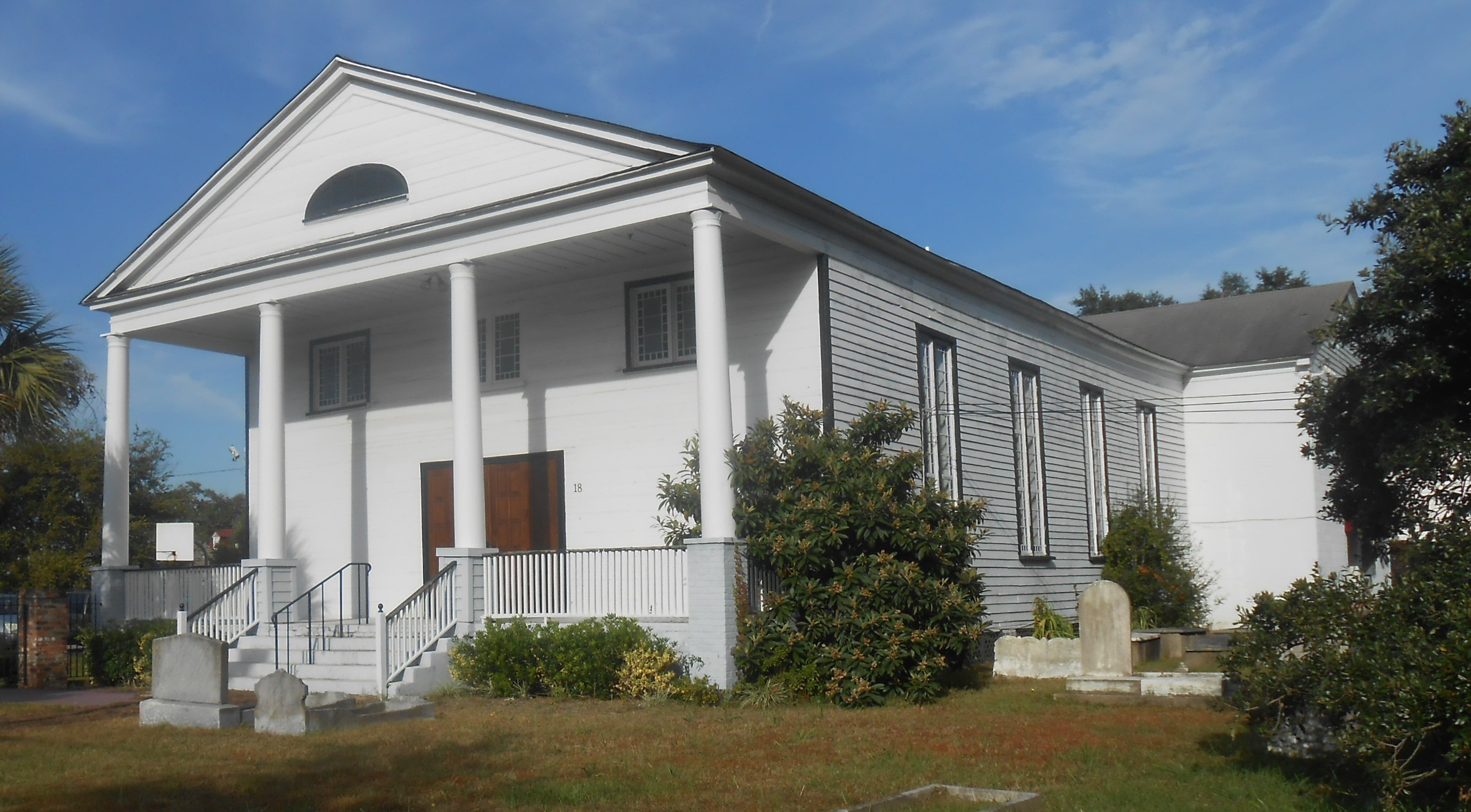
St. John's Episcopal

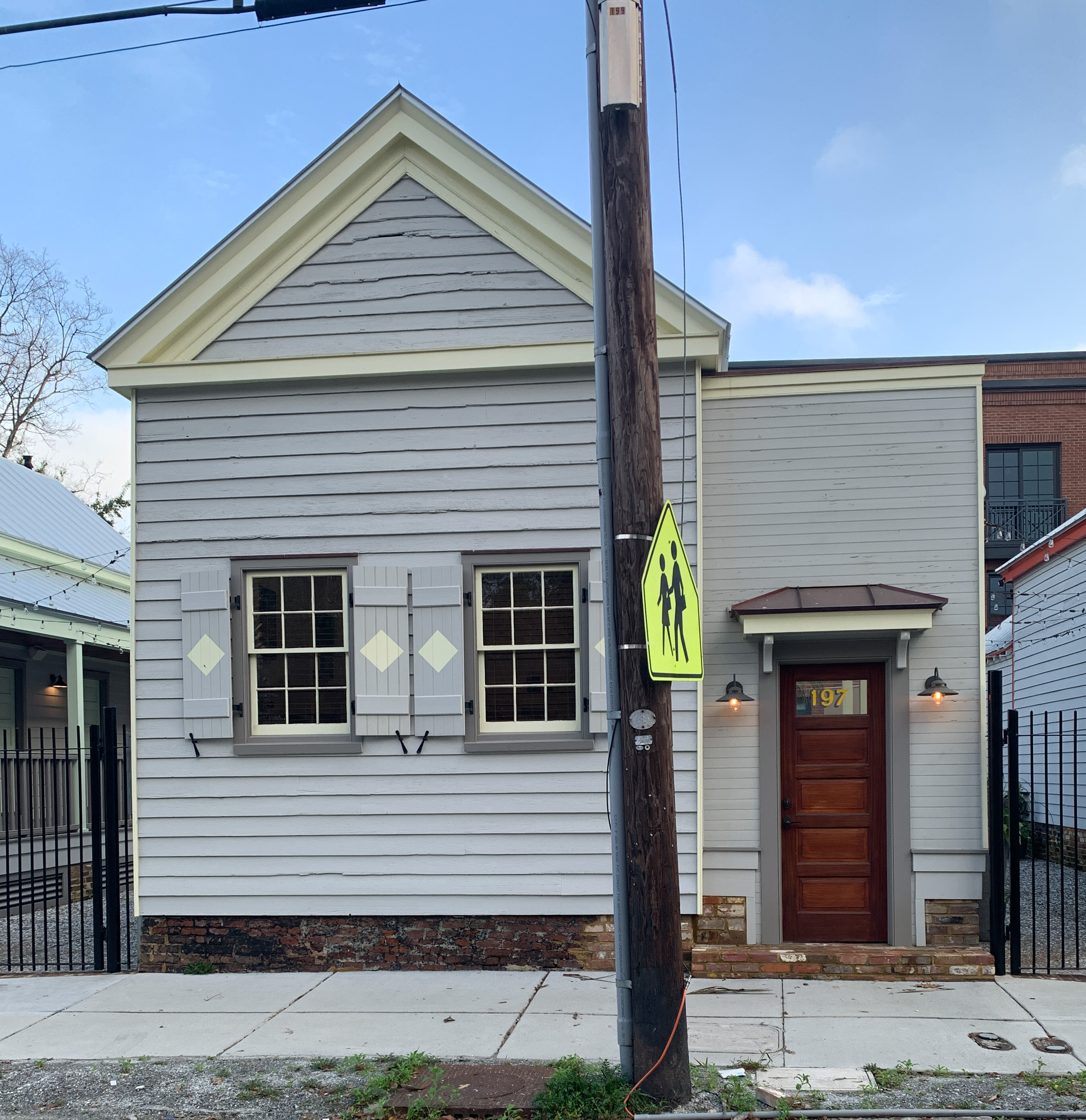
197 Jackson St.

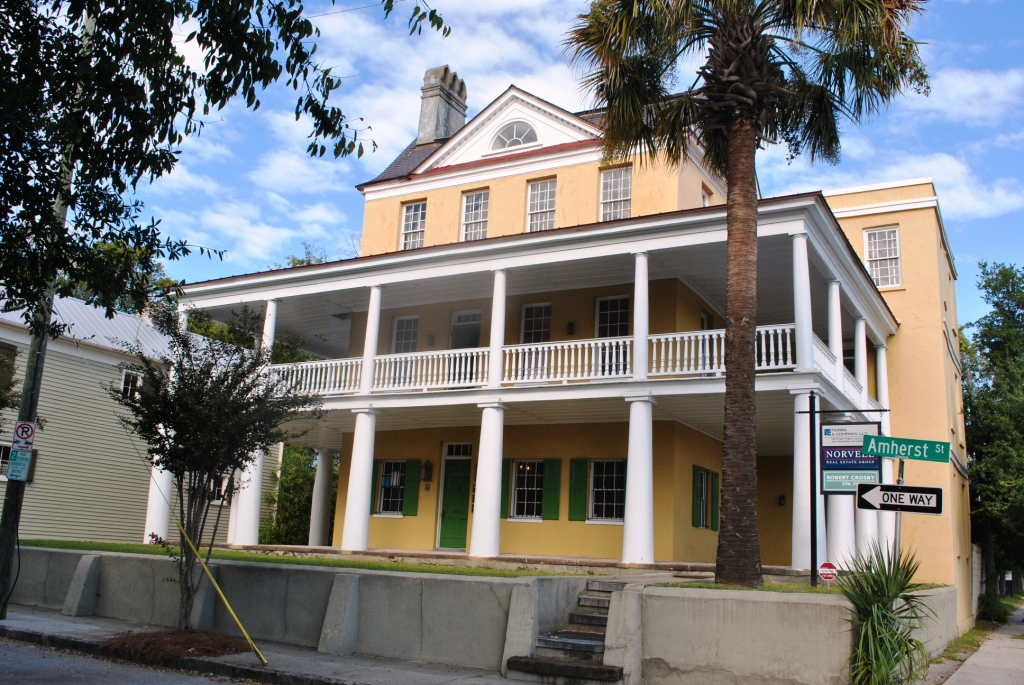
Presqui'ile, 2 Amherst St.

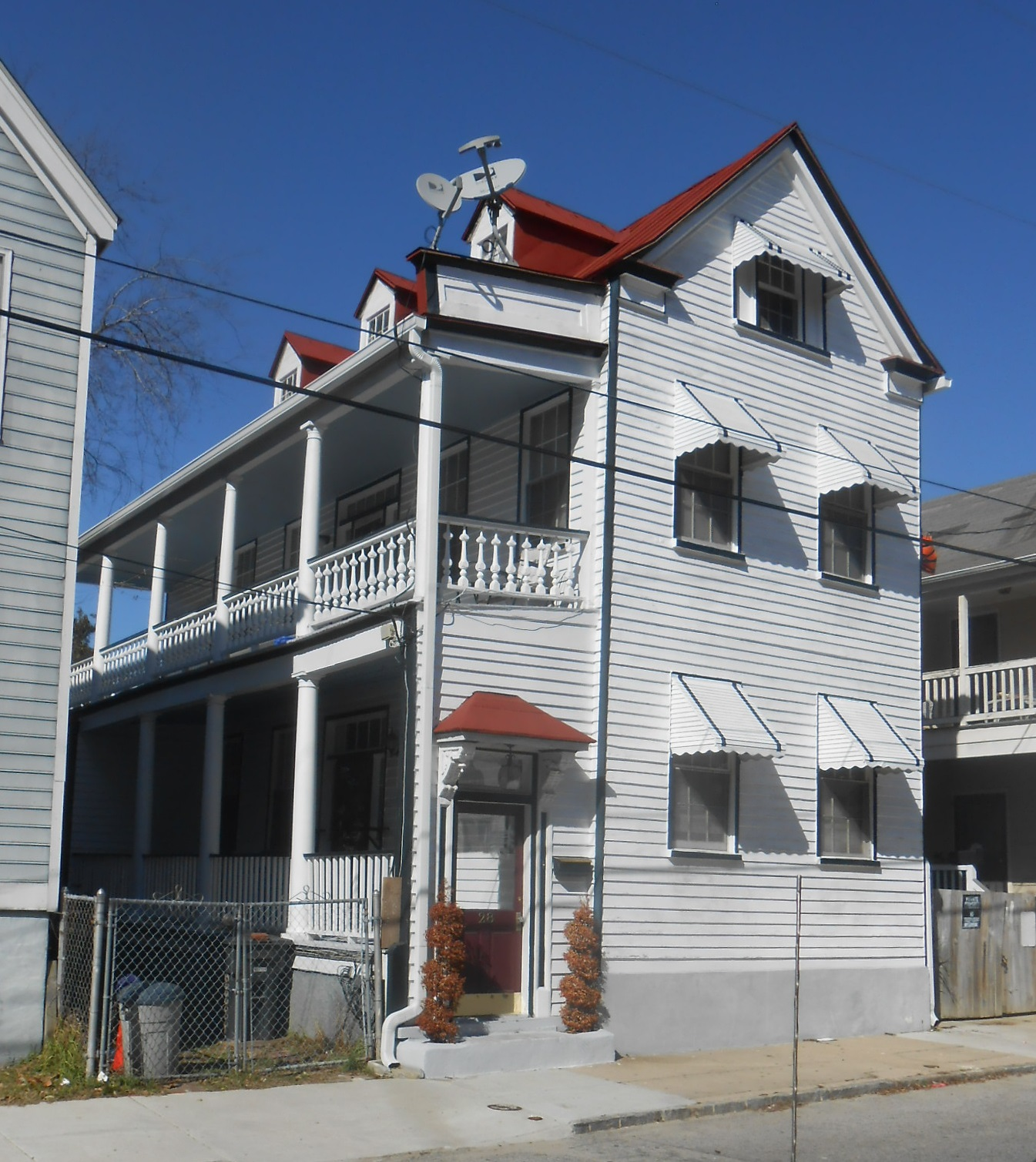
28 Amherst St.

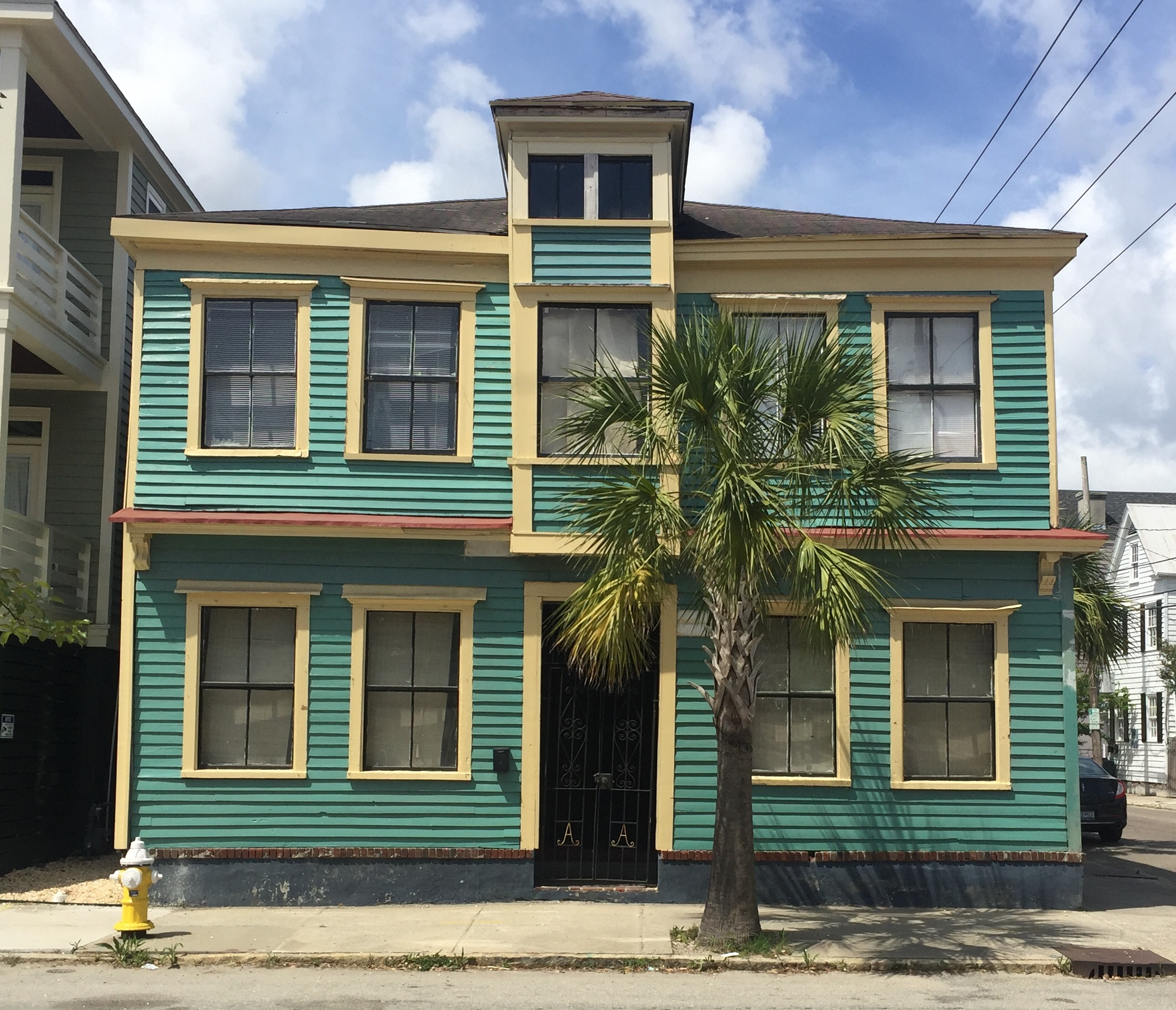
43 America St.

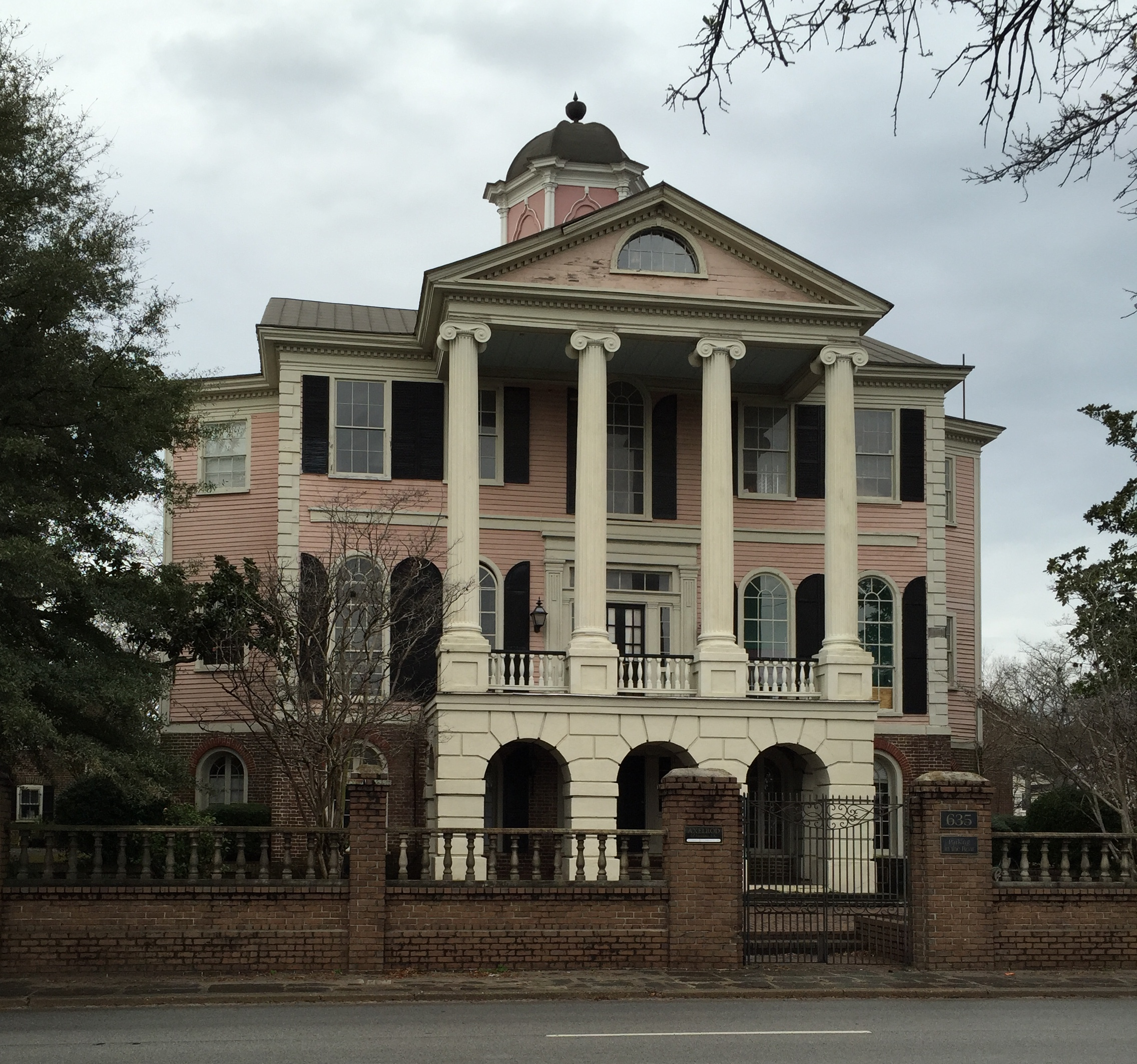
Faber House, 635 East Bay St.

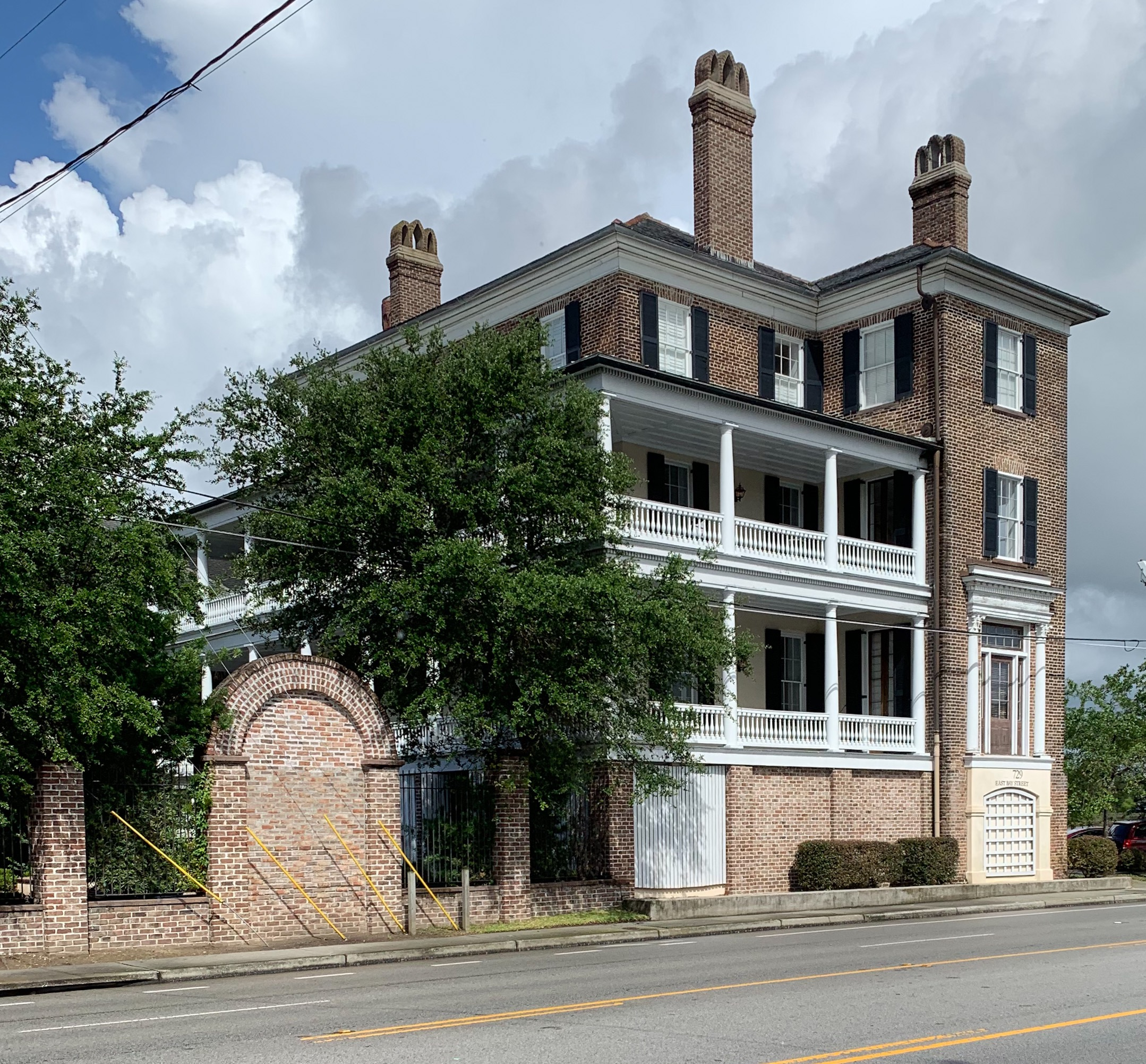
729 East Bay St.
