= Charleston Parks Conservancy =

US nonprofit organization

Charleston Parks Conservancy is a non-profit group supporting park renovations, improvements, and restorations in Charleston, South Carolina. It was founded in 2007 and is funded by donations. The Conservancy was started by local businesswoman Darla Moore with the purpose to restore Colonial Lake) on the Charleston Peninsula. The Conservancy has since developed a plan to renovate and restore historic elements to Hampton Park, starting with the 2018 renovation of the Rose Pavilion.

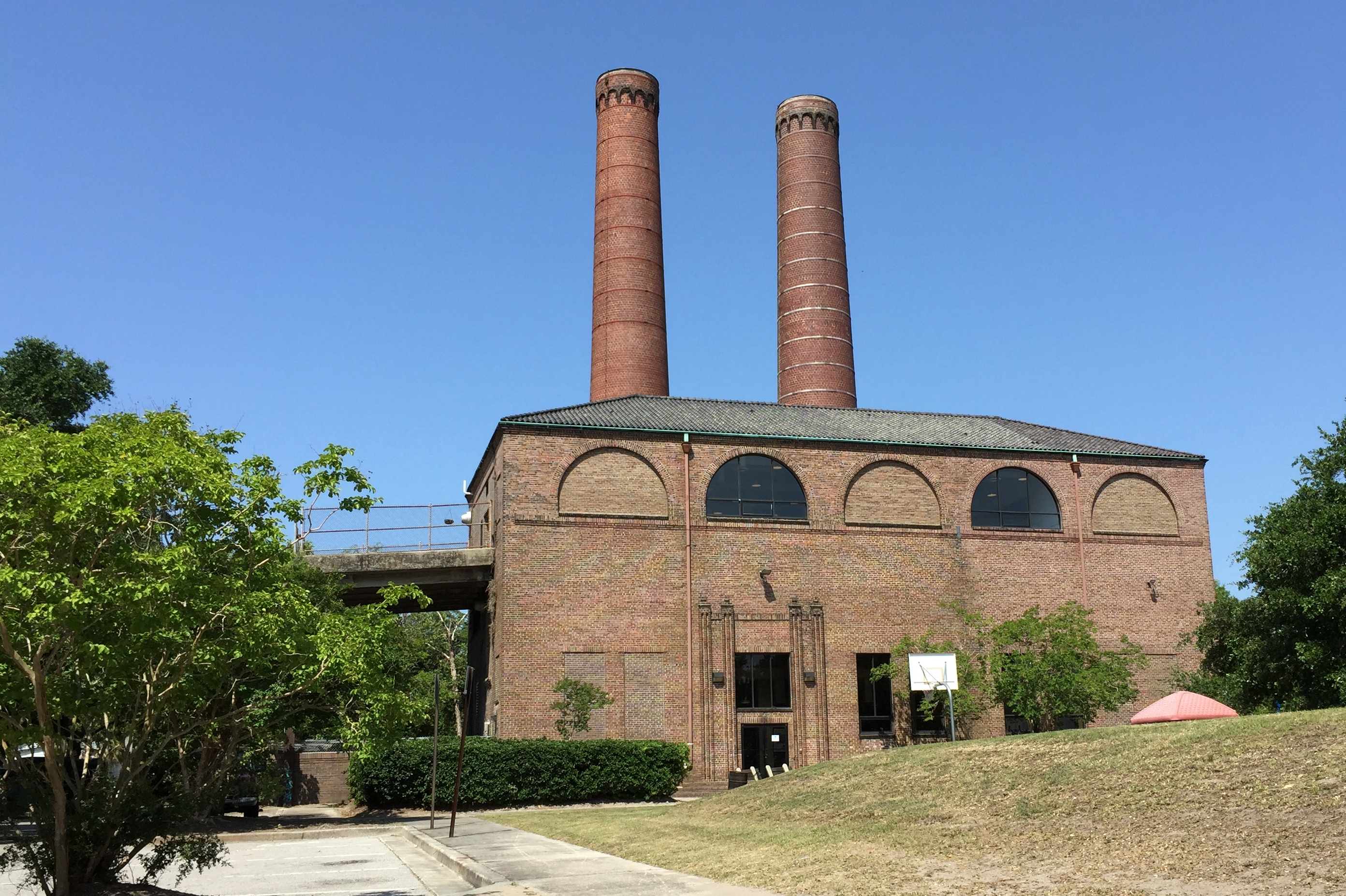
The St. Julian Devine Community Center

In 2015 the Charleston Parks Conservancy announced plans to renovate the St. Julian Devine Community Center, funding is still ongoing. The Conservancy also received a National Endowment for the Arts grant for the installation of artworks at a park in 2017.

The group's headquarters are at 720 Magnolia Rd Suite 25 in Charleston in the Avondale neighborhood.

== Website ==
- Charleston Parks Conservancy website
