= Mitchell Playground =

Park in Charleston, South Carolina, United States

Coordinates: 32.7942°N 79.9485°W

- Interactive map of Mitchell Playground
- Location: 145 Fishburne St., Charleston, South Carolina 29403
- Area: 1.7 acres (0.69 ha)
- Created: 1910
- Operator: City of Charleston

Mitchell Playground is a public park in Charleston, South Carolina bounded by Fishburne St. (north), Perry St. (east), Sheppard St. (south), and Rutledge Ave. (west). It is named for the Julian Mitchell Elementary School to the immediate east of the playground.

== History ==
Mitchell Playground was both the first public playground in Charleston as well as in South Carolina. The park served the upper wards of Charleston predominantly, but it was convenient to the main trolley lines too. The park was a turf field surrounded by a hedge and shade trees with gates into the playground at each corner. Paths crossed diagonally through the park. Equipment included swings, monkey bars, and joggling boards. The playground had live tennis courts, a basketball court, a football field, and other amenities.

Initially, Mitchell Playground did not admit black children. However, later into the era of segregation, Mitchell Playground was devoted exclusively to black children while other parks, such as Hampton Park, were reserved for white children.
