= Vivian Anderson Moultrie Playground =

Playground in Charleston, South Carolina, USA

Coordinates: 32.8116°N 79.9518°W

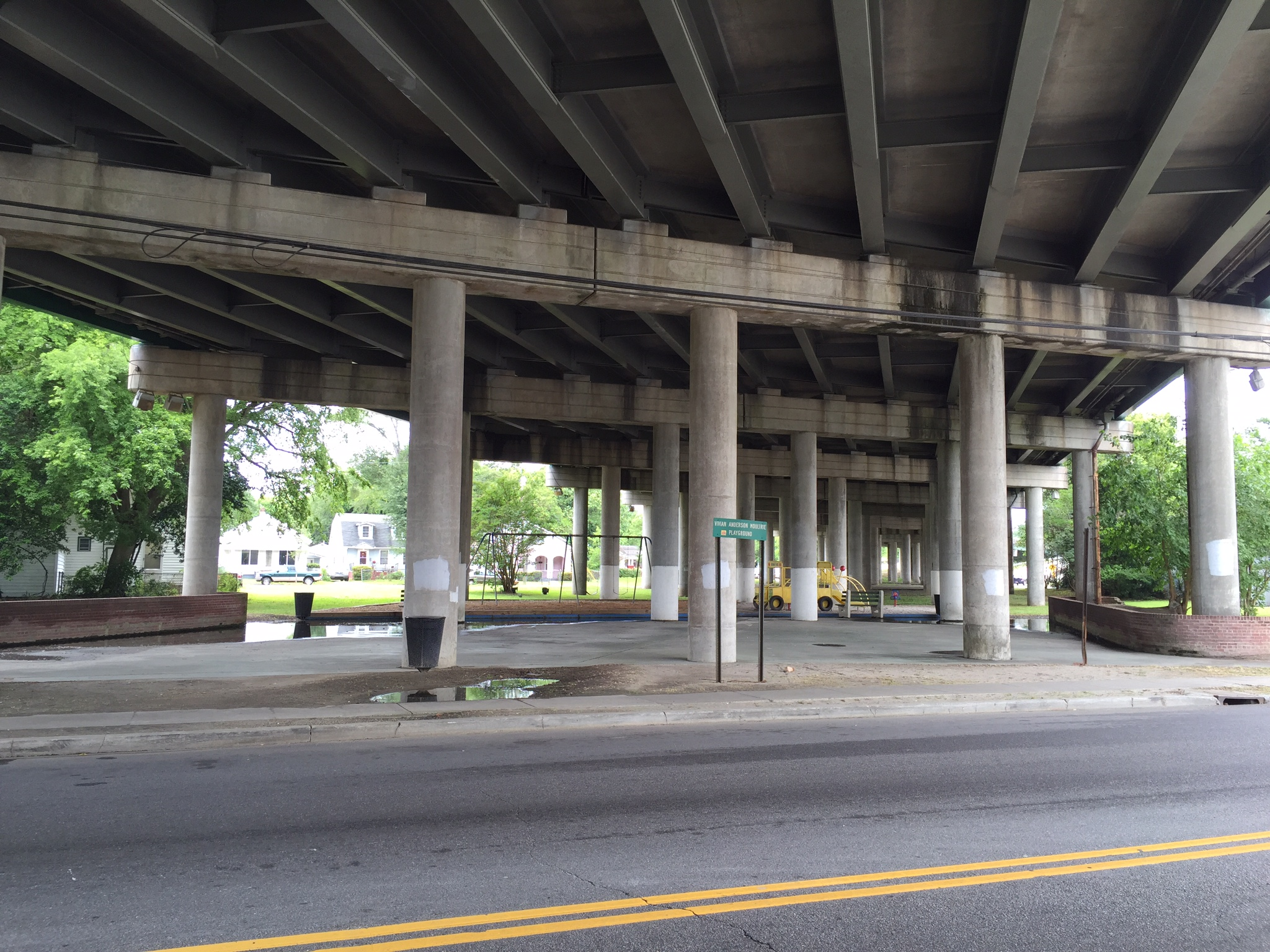
- Interactive map of Vivian Anderson Moultrie Playground
- Location: 1201 King St. (approx.), Charleston, South Carolina
- Created: 1970s
- Operator: City of Charleston

Vivan Anderson Moultrie Playground was established in the early 1970s to mitigate the effects of I-26's routing through the Charleston peninsula in South Carolina, United States. After the elevated interstate was completed, a sandbox and play equipment were installed beneath the roadway. The new recreation area was initially known as Linear Park. In 2000, the City of Charleston upgraded the playground and renamed it in honor of a long-time resident.
