= Mcmahon playground =

Park in Charleston, South Carolina, United States

Coordinates: 32.7981°N 79.9531°W

McMahon Playground
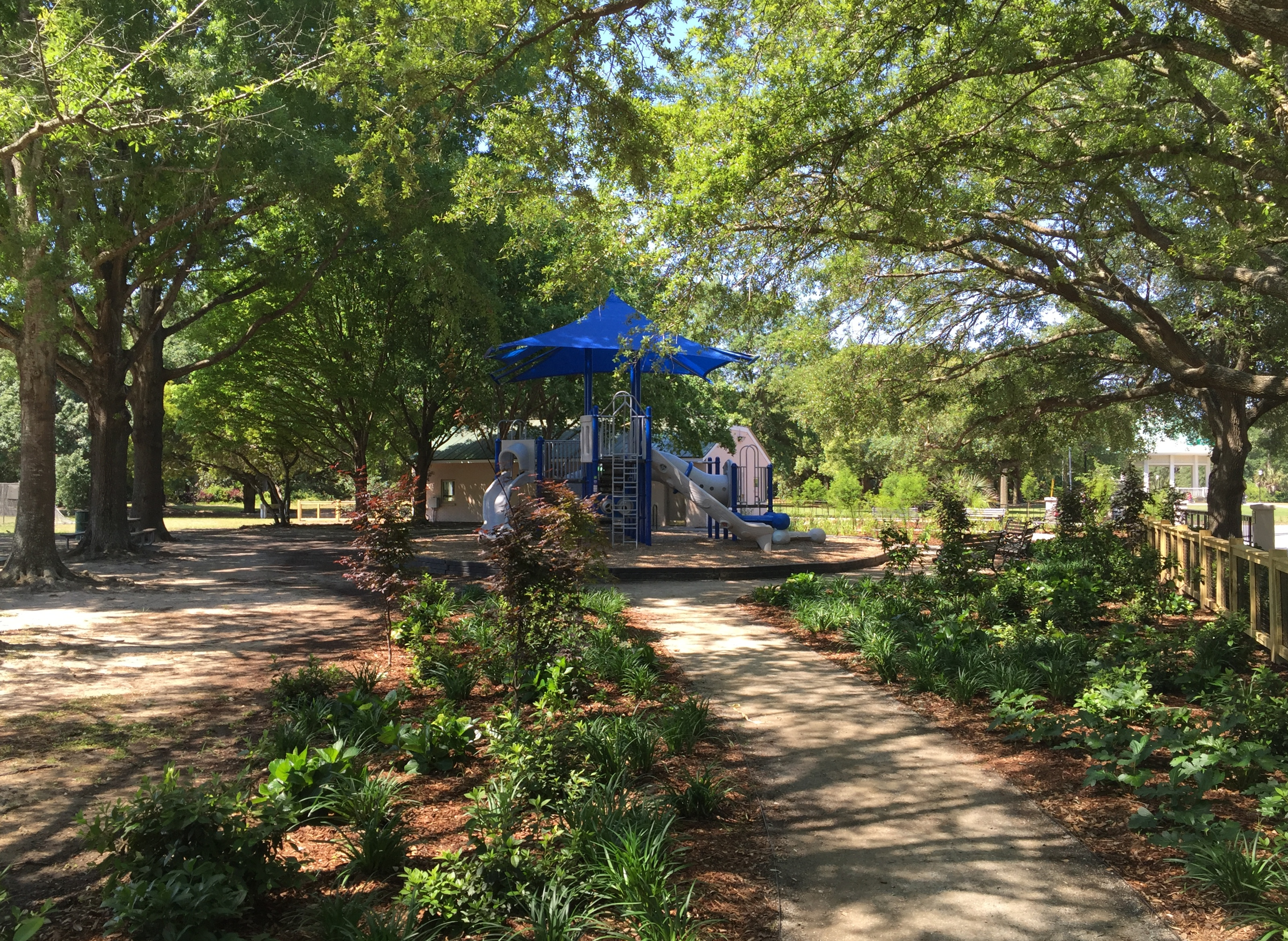
- Interactive map of McMahon Playground
- Area: 1 acre (0.40 ha)
- Operator: City of Charleston

McMahon Playground is a playground located between Hampton Park and Rutledge Ave. in Charleston, South Carolina, USA. The playground is named for Genevieve Kanapaux McMahon. She was, for nearly twenty years, the supervisor of the Hampton Park playground. The playground was named in her honor on October 2, 1999.

In 2015, the Charleston Parks Conservancy undertook a renovation of the park. The project, with a budget of $100,000, included reworking the playground equipment and making extensive landscaping improvements.
