= Hazel Parker Playground =

Public playground in Charleston, South Carolina, U.S.

Coordinates: 32.7742°N 79.9271°W

- Interactive map of Hazel Parker Playground
- Location: 70 East Bay St., Charleston, South Carolina 29401
- Area: 3.3 acres (1.3 ha)
- Operator: City of Charleston

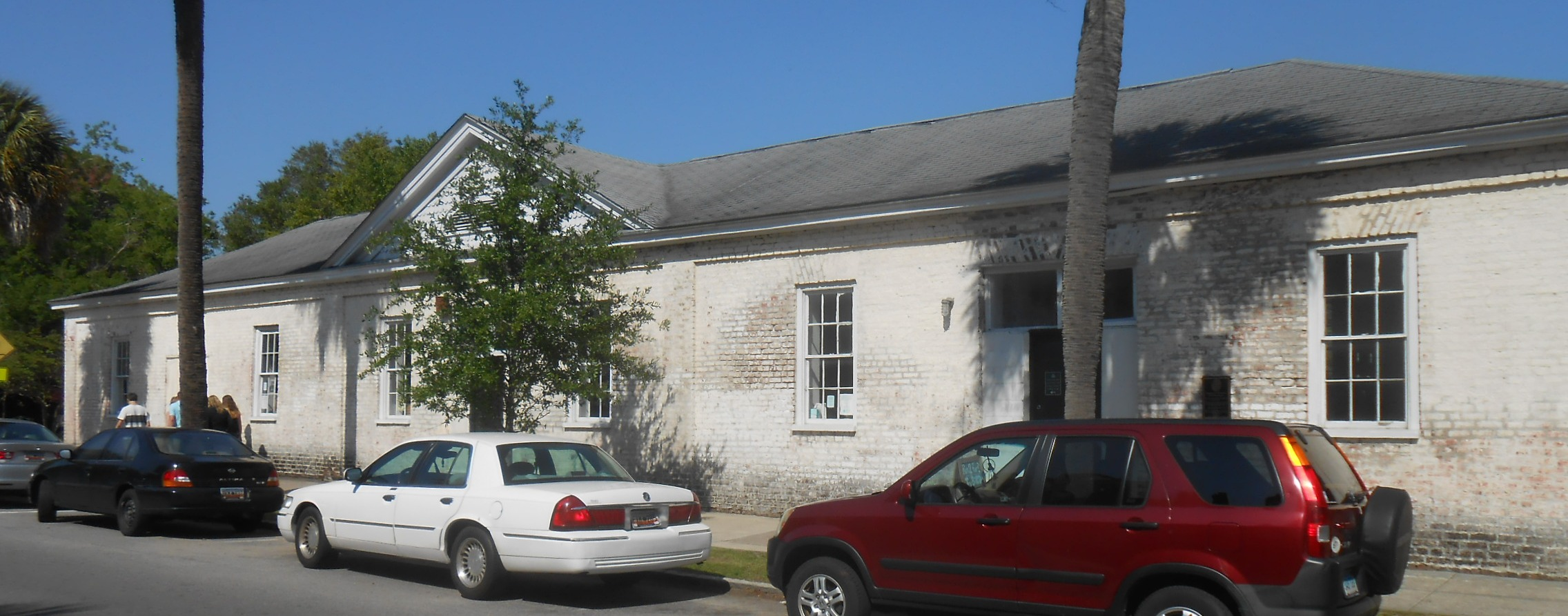
A one-story brick building provides interior activity space at the Hazel Parker Playground at 70 East Bay Street, Charleston, South Carolina.

Hazel Parker Playground is a public park in Charleston, South Carolina named after Hazel V. Parker in 1977. Hazel Parker was the recreation supervisor at the playground starting in 1942. The playground was formerly known as the East Bay Playground.

The land had been owned by the Port Utilities Commission. The park was constructed in 1933 by unemployed workers through a federal relief program.

During World War II, owners of the real estate gave the land as part of the war effort. The U.S. Navy was given access to the property on the condition that the Navy improve the property and make it suitable as a playground.
