= Demetre Park =

Park in Charleston, South Carolina, US

Coordinates: 32.7530341°N 79.9176139°W

Melton Peter Demetre Park
- Interactive map of Melton Peter Demetre Park
- Location: 640 Wampler Drive, Charleston, South Carolina
- Area: 5.0 acres (2.0 ha)
- Created: 2000
- Operator: City of Charleston

Melton Peter Demetre Park is a municipal park in Charleston, South Carolina. Some locals still refer to it by the nickname "Sunrise Park", the park was officially dedicated and named Melton Peter Demetre Park in 2007 after its owner, who donated the land to the City Of Charleston for use as a park.

Melton Demetre owned a parcel of land which provided views across Charleston Harbor to The Battery and surrounding landmarks. During the 1960s, Demetre obtained permits and filled his waterfront lot with dirt, a practice which was later prohibited. In 1970, the United States Army Corps of Engineers ordered Demetre to stop filling the waterfront property, and litigation resulted. Eventually in 1975, a federal judge ruled that the fill dirt could stay but limited the use of the land to Demetre's stated intent of a marina. In 1990, Demetre donated the land to the City of Charleston, transferring the deed to the land on the condition that it be converted into a park with certain agreed upon amenities within ten years, and that the park be dedicated to Demetre when opened. When the ten-year deadline approached in 2000, the city installed a makeshift floating dock without a permit, and did not fulfill other agreed to obligations. Demetre claimed that the work did not satisfy the conditions of the deed, and he sued to have the land returned to him based on the reverter clause in the deed. The lawsuit settled in 2007 in Demetre's favor, with the city agreeing to a timetable for certain improvements including the construction of a 190-foot pier.

The park has a fishing pier, two large sandy waterfront beaches, marshes, a covered picnic area, a large nature preserve pond, fields of green grass and the beginnings of a hiking trail. The 190-foot fishing pier extending into the harbor opened in February 2009. The pier leads to a 20-by-20-foot pier head and 40-foot floating dock. Other projects include steps leading to the beach areas and an automatic gate that opens the parking area from 6 a.m.-8 p.m. daily. The park improvements were built with $450,000 approved by Charleston City Council for the only city administered waterfront park on James Island. In June 2019, it was announced that the park would be closed for the summer months while work began on a project to fix past hurricane damage and make further improvements to the park. The project was projected to cost over $800,000. The views from the park take in the Battery, the Downtown Charleston Peninsula, the Ravenel Bridge, Patriots Point, Sullivan's Island, and Fort Sumter among other areas.
