= Northbridge Park =

Park in South Carolina, United States

Coordinates: 32.834373°N 79.986246°W

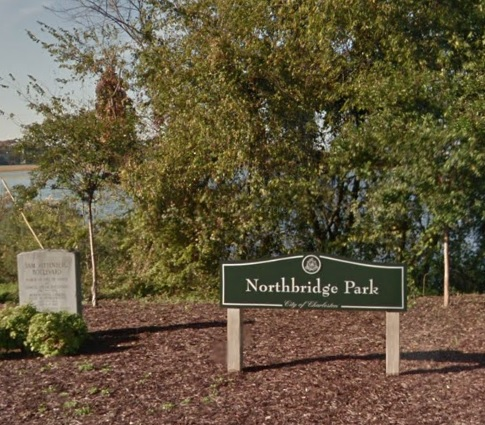
- Interactive map of Northbridge Park
- Location: Sam Rittenberg Boulevard (SC Highway 7 at the base of the North Bridge over the Ashley River), Charleston, South Carolina 29407
- Area: 3.0 acres (1.2 ha)
- Created: 2014
- Operator: City of Charleston
- Parking: 16 spaces

Northbridge Park is a public park in the West Ashley area of Charleston, South Carolina on land owned by the South Carolina Department of Transportation but operated by the City of Charleston. The park is on the south shore at the point Sam Rittenberg Boulevard crosses the Ashley River. The park, which cost about $1.5 million, opened on May 27, 2014, with a pier and dock, a canoe and kayak launch, a picnic area, and 16 parking spaces.
