= Allan Park (Charleston, South Carolina) =

Public park in Charleston, South Carolina, USA

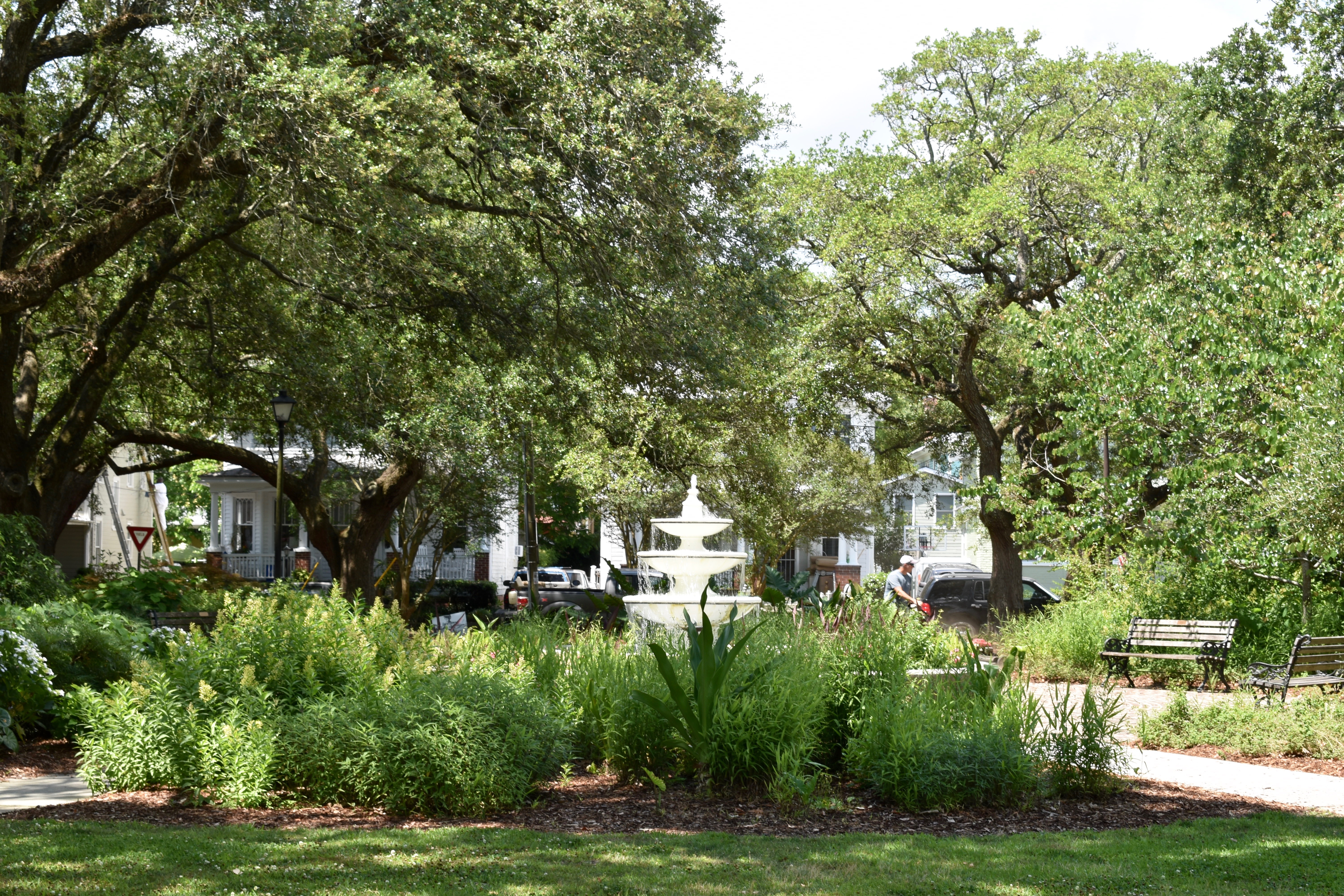
- Interactive map of Allan Park
- Coordinates: 32°47′50″N 79°57′10″W
- Created: 1922
- Operator: City of Charleston

Allan Park is a park in Charleston, South Carolina. The parcel of land was donated to the City of Charleston by Amey Allan, the widow of James Allan and the developer of most of the eastern half of Hampton Park Terrace parks on the peninsula, on March 23, 1920. The park is lined with oak trees which replaced the palmetto trees in the original plans.

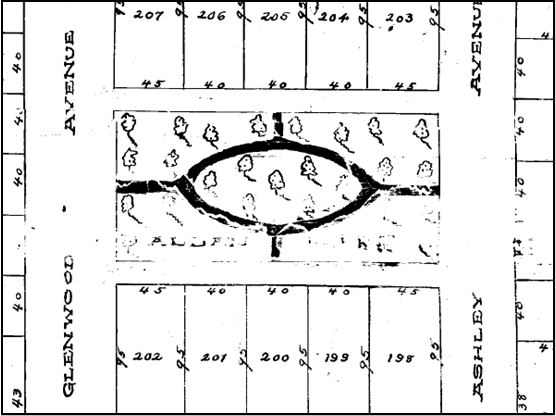
Allan Park was included in the original plans for the development of the southeastern portion of Hampton Park Terrace, recorded in 1912. It is unknown if the landscaping was actually installed before the park's dedication or was merely conceptual.

In contrast to nearby Hampton Park, the city’s largest park on the peninsula, Allan Park is one of the smallest. The parcel of land was donated to the City of Charleston by Mrs. Amey Allan, the widow of James Allan and the developer of most of the eastern half of Hampton Park Terrace. City Council had accepted the gift on March 23, 1920, but it was not recorded until August 16, 1921, and includes a term calling for its reversion to the family if ever not used for a park. The first reference to the park appeared in the 1922 City Year Book in a report from the Parks Commission. That year the following report was made:

The ground out of which this park was formed was given to the City by Mrs. Jas. Allen (sic), for whom it is named, the physical outline of the Park was proposed by the Supervisor, the actual work was done under contract by the Simons & Mayrant Co., at a cost of $780.00. The Light was donated by the Rubin Electrical Co., which has added much to the beauty of this little Park, which is very much appreciated by the residents in the immediate neighborhood, and makes a very nice spot where children play.

No details were given of the layout of the new park other than a short reference to the work being performed: “Concrete walks being laid and a large fountain, with a flower bed in the middle of the park.” Sadly, the enthusiasm for the park does not appear to have converted to care for it. By the following year, the report of the commissioners was dourer:

With much regret I must report that the venture in improving Allen (sic) Park has fallen short of expectations. The Fountain suffered severely, at the hands it is presumed of the children of the neighborhood, the water jets being twisted off and destroyed. This will necessitate filling the basin in with soil. Two concrete benches were placed in this Park, the balance of the benches there repaired. Twelve Palmetto trees were planted, the grass was cut and the grounds kept up.

By 1924, the only reference to the park was this: “Here the grass was kept in good condition, and the fountain, which had become objectionable with stagnant water, was filled with earth for planting.”

At some point, the palmetto trees were removed, and oak trees were installed. The focus of the park remained the raised flower bed, the original fountain. Allan Park began being used more frequently in the 1990s. During Spoleto, the Charleston Symphony would erect a large stage and tent and perform a concert for many neighbors who brought picnic blankets to the park. Then, in the 1990s, the neighborhood joined in encouraging the replacement of the fountain in Allan Park. Three designs were offered from the City with an unofficial vote taken during one of the concerts. The option finally selected was a series of three, plain, cast-concrete bowls flowing into the basin. During the first year, the City maintained the raised beds surrounding the fountain with colorful flowers, but care lagged. The fountain was installed in 2000, but it stopped working in 2002 and sat idle. The city repaired and modified the fountain in 2004.

Allan Park began being used more frequently in the 1990s and the nearby neighborhood encouraged the replacement of the fountain in Allan Park. The new fountain was installed in 2000 but it had a myriad of issues and sat idle for two years until it was repaired and modified in 2004.

The neighborhood association for Hampton Park Terrace undertook raising money for a refurbishing of Allan Park, in concert with a donation from a member of the Allan family, and the work was performed over three days in May 2012 by more than 50 volunteers.

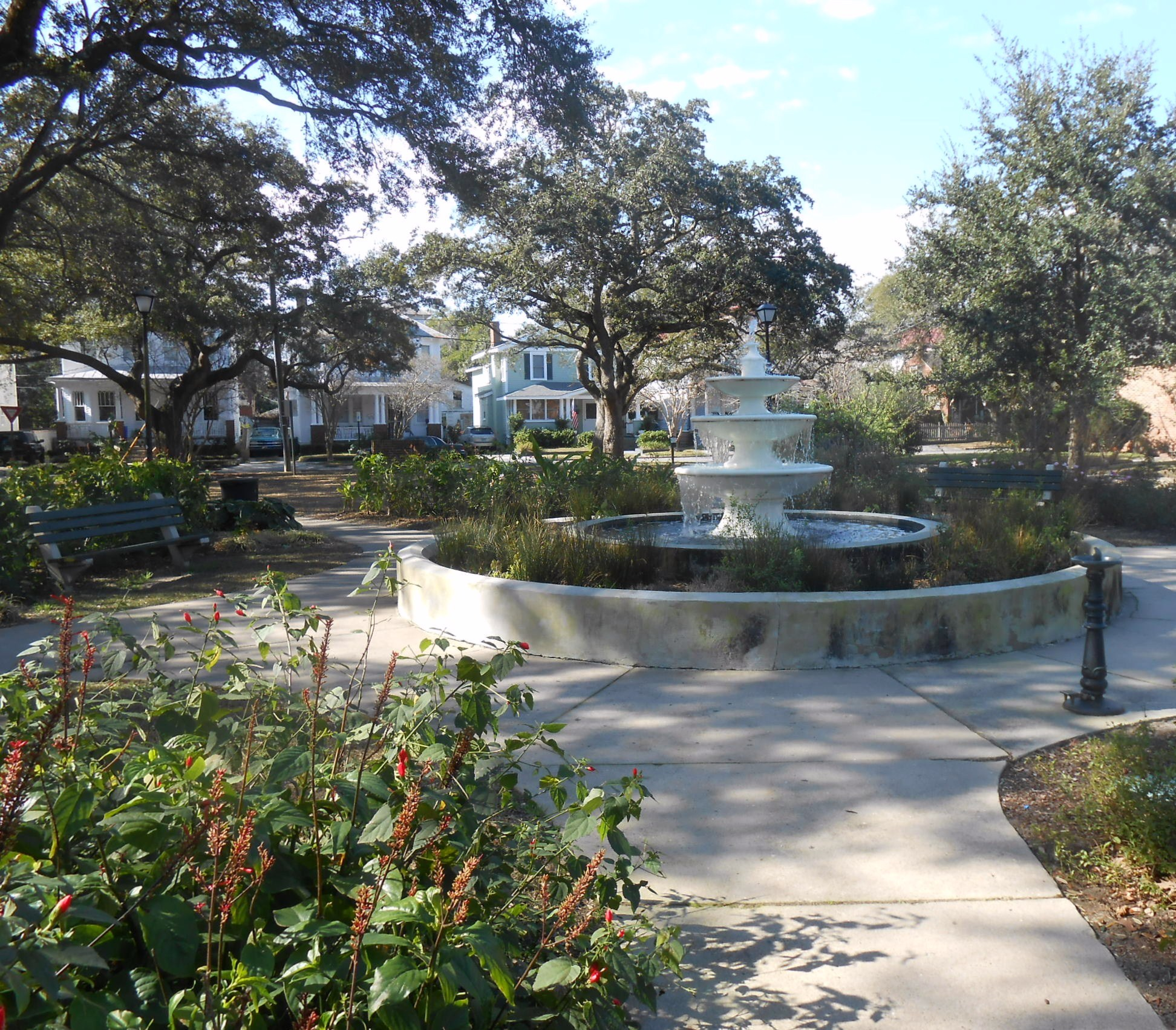
A fountain was returned in the center of Allan Park in 2002.
