= Martin Park =

Park in Charleston, South Carolina, United States

- Interactive map of Martin Park
- Location: 155 Jackson St., Charleston, South Carolina 29401
- Coordinates: 32.799732°N 79.938829°W
- Area: 3.62 acres (1.46 ha)
- Operator: City of Charleston

Martin Park is a public park in Charleston, South Carolina. It is bounded by Lee (south), Jackson (north), Hanover (west), and America (east) Streets. The park includes a softball field, a playground, a basketball court, tennis courts, community center and a large swimming pool.

The pool, known as the Martin Luther King Jr. Pool, was added in 1973. The pool had initially been planned for a nearby park at Hampstead Square, but the ground was deemed unsuitable. The Olympic sized pool opened to the public in June 1974 and is the only public 50-meter pool in the region. It is one of two public pools in the city of Charleston that are open all year.
