= Theodora Park =

Park in Charleston, South Carolina, US

Coordinates: 32.785897°N 79.931429°W

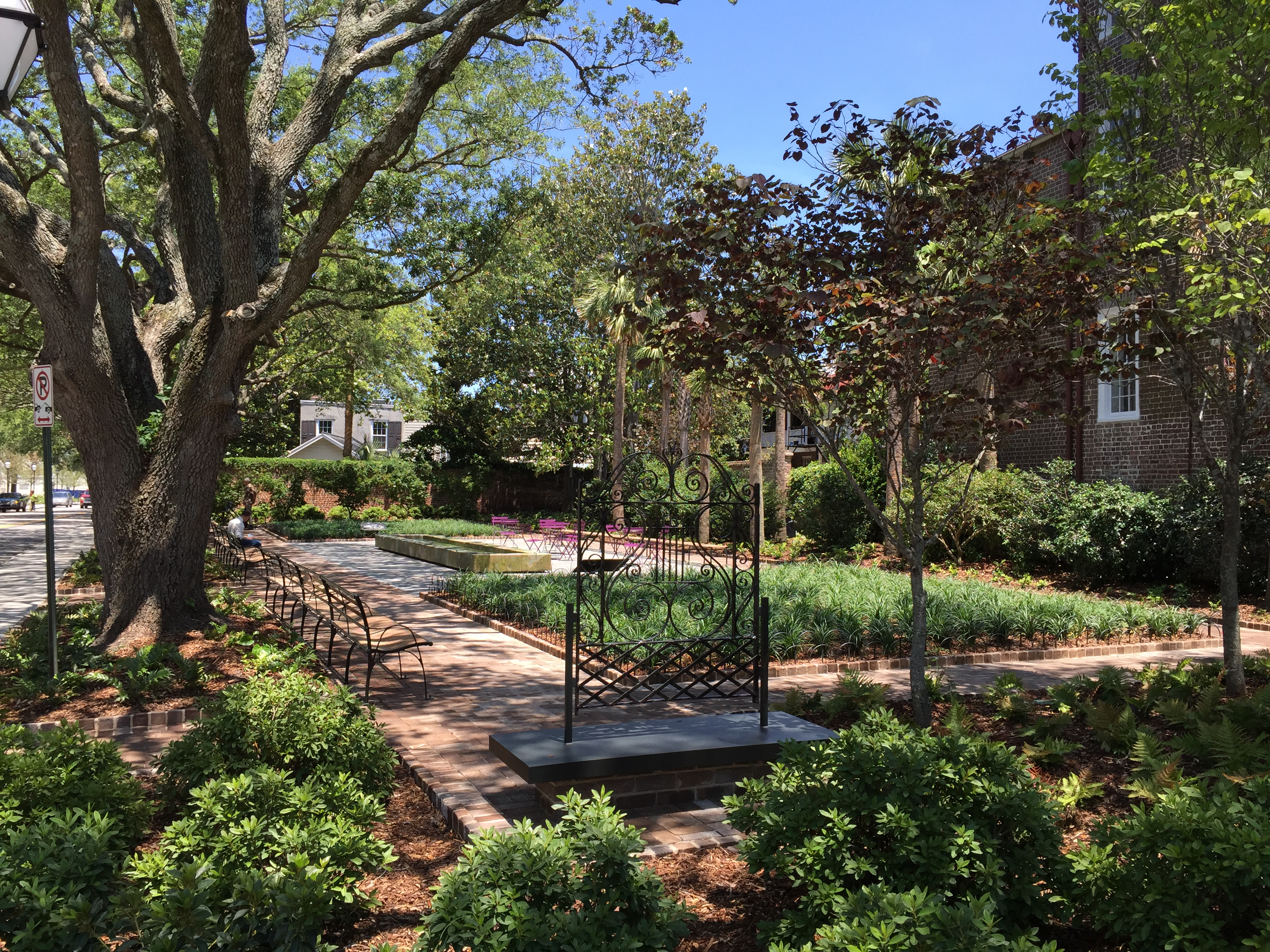
- Interactive map of Theodora Park
- Location: 84 Anson Street, Charleston, South Carolina
- Created: 2014-2015
- Operator: City of Charleston
- Parking: 0

Theodora Park is a small public park in Charleston, South Carolina operated by the City of Charleston. The park was masterminded by David Rawle, public relations and marketing firm founder, who lives nearby in the historic Ansonborough neighborhood. The park, named for his mother, is one of Charleston's most unusual pocket parks.

Previously, a playground known as the Ansonborough Tot Lot occupied the location, but it was underused; there were few children in the neighborhood, and a newer playground opened not far away. The design for the new park was inspired by Paley Park in New York City on 53rd Street.

The centerpiece of the park is a 32-foot-long fountain pool with handmade ceramic tiles by the noted artist Paul Heroux. The park also features a gate made by Charleston blacksmith Philip Simmons. The gate is presented as a stand-alone piece of art.

Sheila Wertimer was the landscape architect for the project and the Charleston Parks Conservancy helps maintain the park.

The New York Times called Theodora Park "a beautifully tranquil public garden", and The Post and Courier described it as "a new gem . . . a model for the future".

The park was officially opened to the public on Saturday, June 6, 2015.
