= Hampton Park Terrace =

Historic house in South Carolina, United States

- Hampton Park Terrace Historic District
- U.S. National Register of Historic Places
- U.S. Historic district
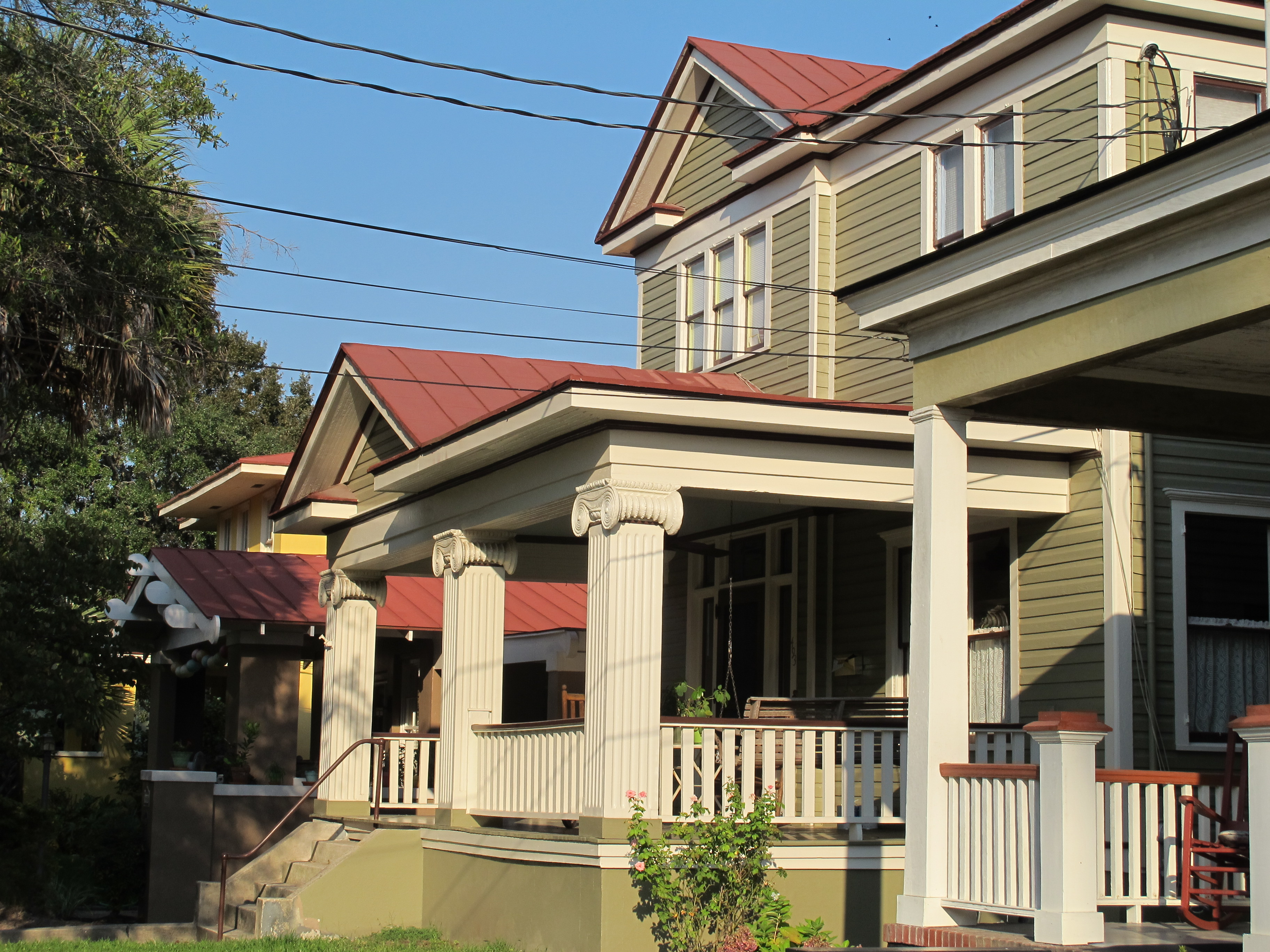
- Houses along Huger St. produce a consistent streetscape.

- Location within South Carolina Location within the United States
- Location: Roughly bounded by Hagood, and Rutledge Aves., and Moultrie, and Congress Sts., Charleston, South Carolina
- Coordinates: 32°47′47″N 79°57′17″W
- Area: 31 acres (13 ha)
- Built: 1912
- Architectural style: Late 19th And Early 20th Century American Movements, Late 19th And 20th Century Revivals
- NRHP reference No.: 97001186
- Added to NRHP: September 26, 1997

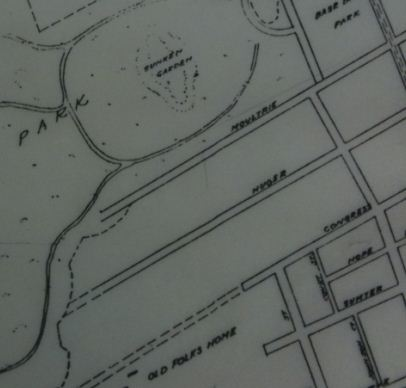
This portion of a 1912 street map shows the area of Charleston that would become Hampton Park Terrace just before its cross streets were laid out.

Hampton Park Terrace is the name both of a neighborhood and a National Register district located in peninsular Charleston, South Carolina. The neighborhood is bounded on the west by The Citadel, on the north by Hampton Park, on the east by Rutledge Ave., and on the south by Congress St. In addition, the one block of Parkwood Ave. south of Congress St. is considered, by some, to be included. The National Register district, on the other hand, is composed of the same area with two exceptions: (1) the northeasternmost block is excluded and (2) an extra block of President St. is included.

== History ==
The land upon which the neighborhood is built was rural land until approximately 1900. At about that time, a few streets began being laid out in the northern end of the city. A few small houses were constructed at that time, but most of the land remained undeveloped. In 1912, three large sections of the neighborhood were platted. Those sections roughly correspond to the northwest quadrant, the southwest quadrant, and the southeast quadrant. They were developed by, respectively, the Charleston Building & Investment Co., Hampton Park Terrace Inc., and the Allan family. The final quadrant to the northeast was sporadically developed through the 1930s by the Navy Yard Building & Investment Co.

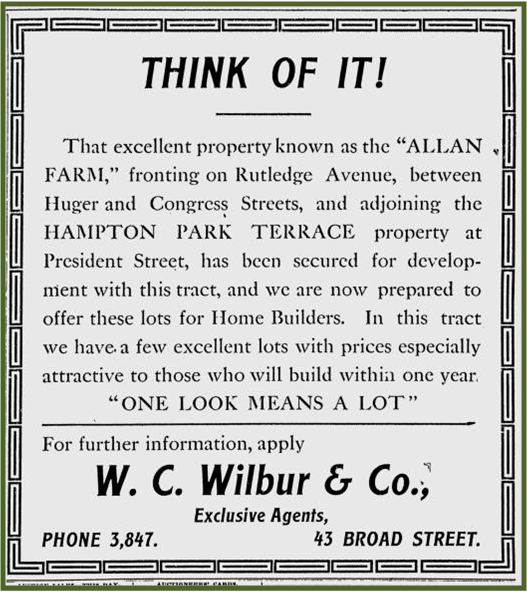
This ad from 1912 announced the start of sales in the southeastern or Allan Farm portion of Hampton Park Terrace.

The neighborhood was, at the time, on the very edge of developed Charleston. At first, skeptics claimed that the development would fail, but within a month of the start of selling lots, more than 100 of the 251 original lots had been sold. The development was amid truck farming sites, but it benefitted from its location near the Ashley River and Hampton Park. A newspaper account at the time predicted that its success would start a move to suburban living in Charleston instead of in the lower peninsula because of these advantages: "No more desirable location for a home could be imagined-close to the river, away from the noise and bustle of the city, on the Rutledge avenue [trolley] car line and close to the King street car line, bordering Hampton Park, beautiful now and to be doubly beautiful when plans now being worked out are completed, within sight of the Ashley River with its fresh salt breezes, and the whole area high and dry, sixteen feet above low water mark, within four blocks of the Mitchell School, the biggest and best of the schools of the city system."

The residents of Hampton Park Terrace celebrated the neighborhood's 100th anniversary in March 2012. The event included a performance by The Citadel's Regimental Band and Pipes and the unveiling of a state historical marker.

== National Register Status ==
Most of the housing in the neighborhood was constructed between 1912 and 1925. The architecture of the neighborhood follows national trends of the period and represents a distinct break from the local tradition of Charleston's other historic areas. Nevertheless, because of its largely intact concentration of early 20th century buildings, the neighborhood (other than the northeasternmost portion) was added to the National Register on September 26, 1997. The National Register designation included those blocks that were laid out and whose restrictive covenants were created by one of four related development companies. As a result, the northeast corner of Hampton Park Terrace was not included in the historic district although it is part of the neighborhood.

Since the designation, several houses have been restored including one which was given a special award by the Historic Charleston Foundation for the quality of the work at 463 Huger St. In 2009, the Preservation Society of Charleston held its first outreach tour of historic houses and highlighted Hampton Park Terrace.

== Gallery of Hampton Park Terrace houses ==
The Hampton Park Terrace National Register district includes historic structures on the following streets:

- Ashley Ave. (north of Congress St. to Huger St.)
- Congress St. (west of Rutledge Ave. to President St. (north side) and west of President St. (both sides))
- Elmwood Ave. (all)
- Glenwood Ave. (all)
- Hagood Ave. (north of Congress St. to Moultrie St. (east side))
- Huger St. (west of Rutledge Ave. to Ashley Ave. (south side) and west of Ashley Ave. (both sides))
- Kenilworth Ave. (all)
- Moultrie St. (west of Ashley Ave.)
- North Allan Park (all)
- Parkwood Ave. (all)
- President St. (north of Sumter St. to Congress St. (west side) and north of Congress St. (both sides))
- Rutledge Ave. (north of Congress St. to Huger St. (west side))
- South Allan Park (all)
- Sumter St. (west of President St. (north side))
- Sutherland Ave. (all)
- Sutherland Ct. (all)
- Wesson Ave. (all)

Unless otherwise indicated, the following table shows images of all of the buildings in the district (contributing and non-contributing) in their current condition; the current images do not necessarily reflect the appearance and condition of the structures at the time the National Register district was formed.

Rating	Image	Address	Year	Form	Style	Comments
Contributing		357 Ashley Ave.	1921	Foursquare		
Contributing		360 Ashley Ave.	1919	Foursquare		
Non-contributing		361 Ashley Ave.	1919	Lateral-gable		Brick veneer added before district created; original windows torn out after district created
Contributing		362 Ashley Ave.	1919	Front-gable		Twin to 4 Elmwood Ave. and 551 Huger St.
Contributing		364 Ashley Ave.	1922	Foursquare		
Contributing		366 Ashley Ave.	1919	Bungalow		
Contributing		368 Ashley Ave.	1920	Front-gable		
Contributing		369 Ashley Ave.	1919	Front-gable		Mirror twin to 324 President St.
Contributing		176 Congress St.	1919	Foursquare		
Contributing		180 Congress St.	1919	Foursquare		
Contributing		182 Congress St.	1920	Foursquare		Near twin to 475 Huger St., 494 Huger St., and 625 Rutledge Ave.
Contributing		184 Congress St.	1920	Foursquare		
Contributing		188 Congress St.	1921	Bungalow		
Contributing		204 Congress St.	1922	Foursquare variant		
Contributing		212 Congress St.	1921	Foursquare		
Contributing		216 Congress St.	1921	Bungalow		Shown here in January 2007, the original, red brick exterior was painted in 2008:
Contributing		218 Congress St.	1917	Foursquare		
Contributing		220 Congress St.	1917	Front-gable		
Contributing		230 Congress St.	1920	Foursquare		
Contributing		232 Congress St.	1920	Front-gable		Built by George Trescott; twin to 236 Congress St., 1 South Allan Park, 5 South Allan Park, 368 Ashley Ave., and 299 President St.
Contributing		236 Congress St.	1920	Front-gable		Built by George Trescott; twin to 232 Congress St., 1 South Allan Park, 5 South Allan Park, 368 Ashley Ave., and 299 President St.
Contributing		238 Congress St.	1920	Front-gable		
Non-contributing		247 Congress St.	1930	Corner store		Harold's Cabin Grocery
Non-contributing		249 Congress St.	1910	Charleston single house		
Contributing		248 Congress St.	1919	Lateral-gable	Craftsman influence	
Contributing		251 Congress St.	1936	Bungalow influence		Built for Marion H. Drews (Chas. Building Permit #3032)
Contributing		252 Congress St.	1931	Other	Minimal traditional	
Contributing		253 Congress St.	1930	Foursquare		
Contributing		254 Congress St.	1931	Other	Minimal traditional	Shown here in 2007 before its original windows were torn out:
Contributing		255 Congress St.	1925	Front-gable		
Contributing		257 Congress St.	1926	Foursquare		
Contributing		258 Congress St.	1921	Lateral-gable		
Contributing		270 Congress St.	1915	Front-gable		An example of a Sears catalog house known as "The Roanoke"
Contributing		274 Congress St.	1920	Foursquare		
Contributing		276 Congress St.	1919	Bungalow		
Non-contributing		278 Congress St.	2009	Front-gable		The property was a vacant lot before the house was built.
Contributing		286 Congress St.	1915	Front-gable		
Contributing		288 Congress St.	1915	Bungalow		
Contributing		292 Congress St.	1922	Bungalow influence		
Contributing		294 Congress St.	1915	Bungalow	Queen Anne influence	
Contributing		296 Congress St.	1931	Bungalow influence		
Contributing		304 Congress St.	1919	Front-gable		
Contributing		306 Congress St.	1916	Front-gable		
Contributing		310 Congress St.	1920	Foursquare		
Contributing		312 Congress St.	1920	Foursquare		The original one-story porch had a deck added in about 2010.
Contributing		314 Congress St.	1923	Foursquare variant		
Non-contributing		1 Elmwood Ave.	1920	Foursquare		Added brick veneer
Contributing		2 Elmwood Ave.	1916	Foursquare		
Contributing		3 Elmwood Ave.	1915	Foursquare		
Contributing		4 Elmwood Ave.	1920	Front-gable		Twin to 362 Ashley Ave. and 551 Huger St.; subsequent renovation reopened porch but removed original windows
Contributing		5 Elmwood Ave.	1916	Bungalow		Twin of 17 Kenilworth Ave. and 341 President St.
Contributing		6 Elmwood Ave.	1914	Bungalow		Before being restored in 2013, the house (shown here in 2011) was covered in vinyl siding:
Contributing		7 Elmwood Ave.	1917	Bungalow	Craftsman	
Contributing		8 Elmwood Ave.	1917	Front-gable		A second floor was added to the front porch in 2012.
Contributing		9 Elmwood Ave.	1915	Front-gable		
Contributing		10 Elmwood Ave.	1917	Foursquare		Home of U.S. Representatives Thomas S. McMillan and Clara G. McMillan from 1917 to 1922
Non-contributing		13 Elmwood Ave.	1916	Lateral-gable		
Contributing		14 Elmwood Ave.	1916	Lateral-gable		
Contributing		16 Elmwood Ave.	1915	Foursquare		
Contributing		18 Elmwood Ave.	1922	Foursquare		
Contributing		1 Glenwood Ave.	1919	Foursquare		
Contributing		3 Glenwood Ave.	1917	Foursquare		
Contributing		4 Glenwood Ave.	1921	Lateral-gable		
Contributing		5 Glenwood Ave.	1916	Foursquare		Twin to 331 President St.
Contributing		7 Glenwood Ave.	1919	Front-gable		
Contributing		9 Glenwood Ave.	1916	Foursquare		
Contributing		74 Hagood Ave.	1938	Lateral-gable	Colonial Revival influence	
Non-contributing		76 Hagood Ave.	1922	Bungalow		Twin to 78 Hagood Ave.; alterations and brick veneer added
Contributing		78 Hagood Ave.	1922	Bungalow		
Contributing		80 Hagood Ave.	1917	Bungalow		
Non-contributing		427 Huger St.	2022	Contemporary		
Contributing		429 Huger St.	1913	Foursquare		
Contributing		439 Huger St.	1922	Front-gable		
Contributing		441 Huger St.	1914	Front-gable with Queen Anne influence		
Contributing		443 Huger St.	1913	Foursquare		Shown here in 2012 just before its vinyl siding was removed during a restoration:
Contributing		447 Huger St.	1921	Foursquare		
Contributing		451 Huger St.	1920	Foursquare variant		
Contributing		460 Huger St.	1912	Foursquare		
Contributing		462 Huger St.	1912	Bungalow influence		
Contributing		463 Huger St.	1921	Lateral-gable	Prairie	Shown here in 2003, the house received an award from the Preservation Society of Charleston for its restoration in 2011:
Contributing		464 Huger St.	1923	Foursquare		
Contributing		468 Huger St.	1914	Foursquare		Original windows removed during subsequent remodelling
Non-contributing		470 Huger St.	1917	Cottage		
Contributing		471 Huger St.	1938	Other	Tudor Revival	
Non-contributing		472 Huger St.	1951	Other	Ranch	
Contributing		473 Huger St.	1920	Foursquare		
Contributing		475 Huger St.	1919	Lateral-gable		Near twin to 494 Huger St., 625 Rutledge Ave., and 182 Congress St.
Contributing		477 Huger St.	1915	Foursquare		
Contributing		478 Huger St.	1937	Lateral-gable	Colonial Revival	The house was designed by its first owners, the Werles of New Jersey, using Winnsboro granite.
Contributing		489 Huger St.	1920	Other	Prairie	Mirror image twin to 6 Wesson Ave.
Non-contributing		490 Huger St.	1914-1917	Freedman's cottage		The house was used as a commercial structure for most of the 20th century, including as period as a dance school.
Contributing		491 Huger St.	1920	Bungalow	Craftsman	
Contributing		493 Huger St.	1917	Foursquare	Queen Anne influence	
Contributing		494 Huger St.	1918	Foursquare		Built by George T. Trescott; near twin to 475 Huger St., 625 Rutledge Ave., and 182 Congress St.
Contributing		496 Huger St.	1915	Front-gable		
Contributing		497 Huger St.	1915	Foursquare	Queen Anne influence	Near twin of 513 Huger St., 10 Kenilworth Ave., and 335 President St.
Contributing		500 Huger St.	1914	Foursquare	Queen Anne influence	
Contributing		501 Huger St.	1914	Foursquare		Childhood home of Akim Anastopoulo. The brick column in the photo (c. 1932) marked an entrance to the neighborhood but was removed at an unknown date.
Contributing		507 Huger St.	1914	Foursquare		
Contributing		510 Huger St.	1917	Foursquare		Home of Samuel Rittenberg from 1919 to 1932
Contributing		512 Huger St.	1912	Foursquare		
Contributing		513 Huger St.	1914 (?)	Foursquare		Near twin to 10 Kenilworth Ave. and 331 President St.
Contributing		515 Huger St.	1916	Foursquare		
Contributing		517 Huger St.	1914	Foursquare		
Contributing		518 Huger St.	1912	Foursquare		
Contributing		530 Huger St.	1916	Foursquare	Queen Anne influence	
Contributing		531 Huger St.	1921	Foursquare		
Contributing		532 Huger St.	1919	Lateral-gable	Prairie	Shown here in 2006, the unique, suspended roof over the front door was replaced with a much larger porch:
Contributing		533 Huger St.	1914	Foursquare		
Contributing		535 Huger St.	1939	Bungalow influence		
Non-contributing		541 Huger St.	1921	Prairie		
Contributing		542 Huger St.	1919	Foursquare		
Contributing		545 Huger St.	1915	Foursquare		
Contributing		549 Huger St.	1929	Lateral-gable	Dutch Colonial	Aladdin house
Contributing		548 Huger St.	1922	Foursquare		
Contributing		550 Huger St.	1921	Bungalow		Mirrorimage twin of 565 Huger St. but with later front-porch enclosure
Contributing		551 Huger St.	1919	Front-gable		Twin of 362 Ashley Ave. and 4 Elmwood Ave.
Contributing		554 Huger St.	1921	Foursquare		
Contributing		555 Huger St.	1916	Foursquare		
Contributing		565 Huger St.	1922	Bungalow		Mirror-image twin of 550 Huger St. but covered in later brick-patterned siding
Non-contributing		567 Huger St.	1922	Lateral-gable	Craftsman influence	Near twin of 330 President St. and 14 Kenilworth Ave.
Contributing		573 Huger St.	1919	Foursquare	Craftsman influence	Home of Mayor Thomas Stoney
Non-contributing		1 Kenilworth Ave.	1920	Lateral-gable		Brick veneer added
Contributing		3 Kenilworth Ave.	1916	Prairie	Prairie	
Contributing		4 Kenilworth Ave.	1916	Foursquare		
Contributing		5 Kenilworth Ave.	1917	Foursquare variant		
Contributing		6 Kenilworth Ave.	1915	Foursquare variant		
Contributing		10 Kenilworth Ave.	1914	Foursquare	Queen Anne influence	Near twin of 497 Huger St., 513 Huger St., and 335 President St.
Contributing		11 Kenilworth Ave.	1919	Other	Bungalow influence	
Contributing		13 Kenilworth Ave.	1915	Other	Bungalow influence	
Contributing		14 Kenilworth Ave.	1920	Lateral-gable	Craftsman influence	Near twin to 330 President St. and 567 Huger St.
Contributing		15 Kenilworth Ave.	1919	Foursquare		
Contributing		16 Kenilworth Ave.	1917	Foursquare		
Contributing		17 Kenilworth Ave.	1915	Bungalow		Twin to 5 Elmwood Ave. and 341 President St.
Contributing		18 Kenilworth Ave.	1916	Foursquare	Queen Anne influence	
Contributing		20 Kenilworth Ave.	1920	Lateral-gable	Prairie influence	
Contributing		105 Moultrie St.	1915	Foursquare		
Contributing		107 Moultrie St.	1927	Foursquare	Craftsman influence	
Contributing		115 Moultrie St.	1920	Foursquare		
Contributing		117 Moultrie St.	1920	Bungalow	Craftsman	
Contributing		121 Moultrie St.	1937	Lateral-gable	Colonial Revival	Designed by Stephen Thomas for Edwin Pearlstine (Chas. building permit #3271)
Contributing		123 Moultrie St.	1937	Other	Colonial Revival	Built for Milton Pearlstine (Chas. building permit #3222)
Non-contributing		137 Moultrie St.	1955	Church	Georgian	Designed by Harold Tatum
Non-contributing		143 Moultrie St.	1913	Foursquare		Brick veneer added
Contributing		145 Moultrie St.	1935	Bungalow	Colonial Revival	Designed by Stephen Thomas for Mr. Isadore Solomon (Chas. building permit #1943)
Contributing		151 Moultrie St.	1916	Foursquare		Twin to 362 President St.; original windows were torn out in 1997
Contributing		153 Moultrie St.	1922	Foursquare		
Contributing		157 Moultrie St.	1916	Foursquare		
Contributing		161 Moultrie St.	1914	Foursquare		
Contributing		163 Moultrie St.	1921	Front-gable		
Contributing		167 Moultrie St.	1923	Foursquare		
Contributing		171 Moultrie St.	1923	Other	Prairie	Faculty House of The Citadel, The Military College of South Carolina; home of U.S. Representatives Thomas S. McMillan and Clara G. McMillan
Contributing		2 North Allan Park	1919	Foursquare		Shown here in 1913 before being restored:
Contributing		6 North Allan Park	1937	Bungalow influence		
Non-contributing		8 North Allan Park	1950	Ranch		Steel casement windows were removed on the south and west elevations following a fire.
Contributing		4 Parkwood Ave.	1921	Foursquare		Built by George Trescott; original windows were torn out in 2012 remodeling
Contributing		6 Parkwood Ave.	1920	Foursquare		
Contributing		10 Parkwood Ave.	1918	Lateral-gable	Craftsman bungalow influence	
Contributing		12 Parkwood Ave.	1920	Foursquare		
Contributing		14 Parkwood Ave.	1917	Foursquare		Shown here in 1917 before a room was added above the front porch:
Non-contributing		16 Parkwood Ave.		Other		
Contributing		23 Parkwood Ave.	1917	Lateral-gable	Colonial Revival influence	
Contributing		24 Parkwood Ave.	1931	Lateral-gable	Spanish Colonial	Shown here in 2004 before a renovation removed the tile roof and the decorative metalwork on the front stoop:
Contributing		26 Parkwood Ave.	1917	Foursquare		A room built over what had been a one-story porch, shown here in 2006, led to the collapse of the addition and the porch in 2008.
Contributing		27 Parkwood Ave.	1914	Foursquare		
Contributing		29 Parkwood Ave.	1922	Foursquare		
Contributing		30 Parkwood Ave.	1914	Foursquare	Queen Anne influence	Shown here in 2006, the house subsequently had its original windows torn out:
Contributing		31 Parkwood Ave.	1916	Front-gable		Shown here before a 2010 restoration, its work was recognized with a 2012 Carolopolis Award:
Contributing		32 Parkwood Ave.	1919	Foursquare	Queen Anne influence	Shown here in 2012 before its artificial siding was removed in 2022.:
Contributing		34 Parkwood Ave.	1917	Front-gable		Shown here in 1922, the house has had its porch enclosed, vinyl siding added, and windows replaced:
Contributing		35 Parkwood Ave.	1916	Bungalow		
Contributing		39 Parkwood Ave.	1917	Lateral-gable	Tudor Revival	
Non-contributing		47 Parkwood Ave.	1951	Ranch		Designed by Augustus Constantine
Contributing		48 Parkwood Ave.	1916	Lateral-gable	Craftsman influence	
Contributing		49 Parkwood Ave.	1916	Foursquare	Queen Anne influence	
Non-contributing		52 Parkwood Ave.	1914	Foursquare		
Contributing		53 Parkwood Ave.	1914	Foursquare		
Non-contributing		54 Parkwood Ave.	1913	Foursquare		
Contributing		56 Parkwood Ave.	1922	Lateral-gable		
Contributing		287 President St.	1920	Front-gable		
Contributing		291 President St.	1919	Bungalow		
Contributing		293 President St.	1921	Front-gable		
Contributing		295 President St.	1920	Bungalow		
Contributing		299 President St.	1919	Front-gable		Shown here in August 2007, the house has since had its windows torn out, its eaves enclosed, and its porch columns changed:
Contributing		301 President St.	1921	Bungalow		
Contributing		303 President St.	1921	Bungalow		
Contributing		305 President St.	1925	Bungalow influence		
Contributing		307 President St.	1910	Freedman's cottage		
Contributing		324 President St.	1919	Front-gable		Twin to 364 Ashley Ave.; built by George Trescott; shown here before a large addition to the north (left in photo) facade in 2010:
Contributing		329 President St.	1914	Bungalow		
Contributing		330 President St.	1921	Lateral-gable	Craftsman influence	Near twin to 567 Huger St. and 14 Kenilworth Ave.
Contributing		331 President St.	1915	Foursquare		Twin to 5 Glenwood Ave.
Contributing		332 President St.	1917	Foursquare		A middle porch support was added in 2012 and the corner columns were covered.
Contributing		335 President St.	1913	Foursquare		Near twin of 513 Huger St. and 10 Kenilworth Ave.
Contributing		336 President St.	1914	Foursquare		
Contributing		337 President St.	1918	Foursquare		
Contributing		338 President St.	1917	Foursquare		Childhood home of Sen. Ernest F. Hollings
Contributing		340 President St.	1917	Foursquare		Shown here in April 2004, the house has since had its original windows torn out, its front porch converted into a deck, and its brickwork repointed with cement:
Contributing		341 President St.	1916	Bungalow		Twin to 5 Elmwood Ave. and 17 Kenilworth Ave.
Contributing		359 President St.	1928	Lateral-gable		
Non-contributing		361 President St.	1914	Other		
Contributing		362 President St.	1916	Foursquare		Twin to 151 Moultrie St. until 2001 work removed some original windows and altered porch column arrangement
Contributing		363 President St.	1921	Foursquare		
Contributing		364 President St.	1915	Foursquare		Home of civil rights leader Septima Clark
Contributing		365 President St.	1921	Foursquare		Built by F.J.H. Haesloop
Contributing		367 President St.	1914	Foursquare variant		
Contributing		368 President St.	1917	Front-gable		Home of Claudia Tharin, founder of Florence Crittendon Home of Charleston. Before the house was restored in 2013, it had been covered in vinyl siding:
Contributing		605 Rutledge Ave.	1922	Foursquare		
Contributing		607 Rutledge Ave.	1922	Bungalow		
Contributing		609 Rutledge Ave.	1920	Front-gable	Craftsman influence	
Contributing		611 Rutledge Ave.	1920	Front-gable		
Contributing		619 Rutledge Ave.	1920	Foursquare		
Contributing		623 Rutledge Ave.	1924	Bungalow		Original windows were later torn out.
Contributing		625 Rutledge Ave.	1919	Foursquare		Near twin to 475 Huger St., 494 Huger St., and 182 Congress St.; the house's restoration in 2012 included removing vinyl siding and restoring original windows
Non-contributing		627 Rutledge Ave.	1990	Commercial		
Contributing		1 South Allan Park	1919	Front-gable		
Contributing		3 South Allan Park	1919	Bungalow		
Contributing		5 South Allan Park	1920	Front-gable		Twin to 1 South Allan Park, 232 Congress St., 236 Congress St., 368 Ashley Ave., and 299 President St.
Contributing		444 Sumter St.	1916	Bungalow influence		
Contributing		2 Sutherland Ave.	1916	Lateral-gable		
Non-contributing		1 Sutherland Ave.	1995	Front-gable		
Contributing		3 Sutherland Ave.	1915	Foursquare		Home of Mayor Thomas P. Stoney from 1915 to 1929
Contributing		4 Sutherland Ave.	1917	Front-gable		
Contributing		5 Sutherland Ave.	1916	Foursquare		
Contributing		6 Sutherland Ave.	1931	Bungalow		
Contributing		7 Sutherland Ave.	1973			
Contributing		8 Sutherland Ave.	1920	Foursquare		
Contributing		10 Sutherland Ave.	1913	Foursquare		
Contributing		11 Sutherland Ave.	1913	Front-gable		
Contributing		12 Sutherland Ave.	1914	Front-gable	Queen Anne influence	
Contributing		14 Sutherland Ave.	1913	Lateral gable	Craftsman influence	Shown here in April, later in 2011, the house had its windows torn out; all its walls, ceilings, and floors removed; its chimneys removed; new openings created; its oriel window removed; and its stoop with wrought ironwork removed:
Contributing		1 Sutherland Ct.	1910	Freedman's cottage		
Non-contributing		3 Sutherland Ct.	after 1942	Other		
Non-contributing		5 Sutherland Ct.	1938	Colonial		Shown here before brick veneer added to east (right in photo) facade and stoop enlargement:
Non-contributing		6 Sutherland Ct.	1887-1902	Freedman's cottage	Victorian	
Contributing		1 Wesson Ave.	1916	Foursquare		
Contributing		2 Wesson Ave.	1920	Foursquare		
Contributing		3 Wesson Ave.	1915	Foursquare	Queen Anne influence	
Contributing		4 Wesson Ave.	1917	Foursquare		In 2016, an unsympathetic renovation resulted in the loss of the historic house and its replacement with a new house, vaguely inspired by the original.
Contributing		5 Wesson Ave.	1915	Foursquare		
Contributing		6 Wesson Ave.	1920	Other	Prairie	Mirror image twin to 489 Huger St.
Contributing		7 Wesson Ave.	1914	Foursquare		
Contributing		8 Wesson Ave.	1918	Foursquare		
Contributing		9 Wesson Ave.	1915	Foursquare		
Contributing		10 Wesson Ave.	1919	Foursquare		
Contributing		11 Wesson Ave.	1922	Lateral-gable		Built by George T. Trescott
