= Etiwan Park =

Park in South Carolina, United States

Coordinates: 32.8560°N 79.9253°W

- Interactive map of Etiwan Park
- Location: 453 Seven Farms Drive, Charleston, South Carolina 29492
- Area: 6.6 acres (2.7 ha)
- Created: 1996
- Operator: City of Charleston

Etiwan Park is a public park on Daniel Island in Charleston, South Carolina. The city spent $100,000 on the first phase of the park's development starting in late 1995. Work continued, and the city spent $325,000 in the fall of 1998.
