= Bees Landing Recreation Center =

Public Park

Coordinates: 32.8318°N 80.0954°W

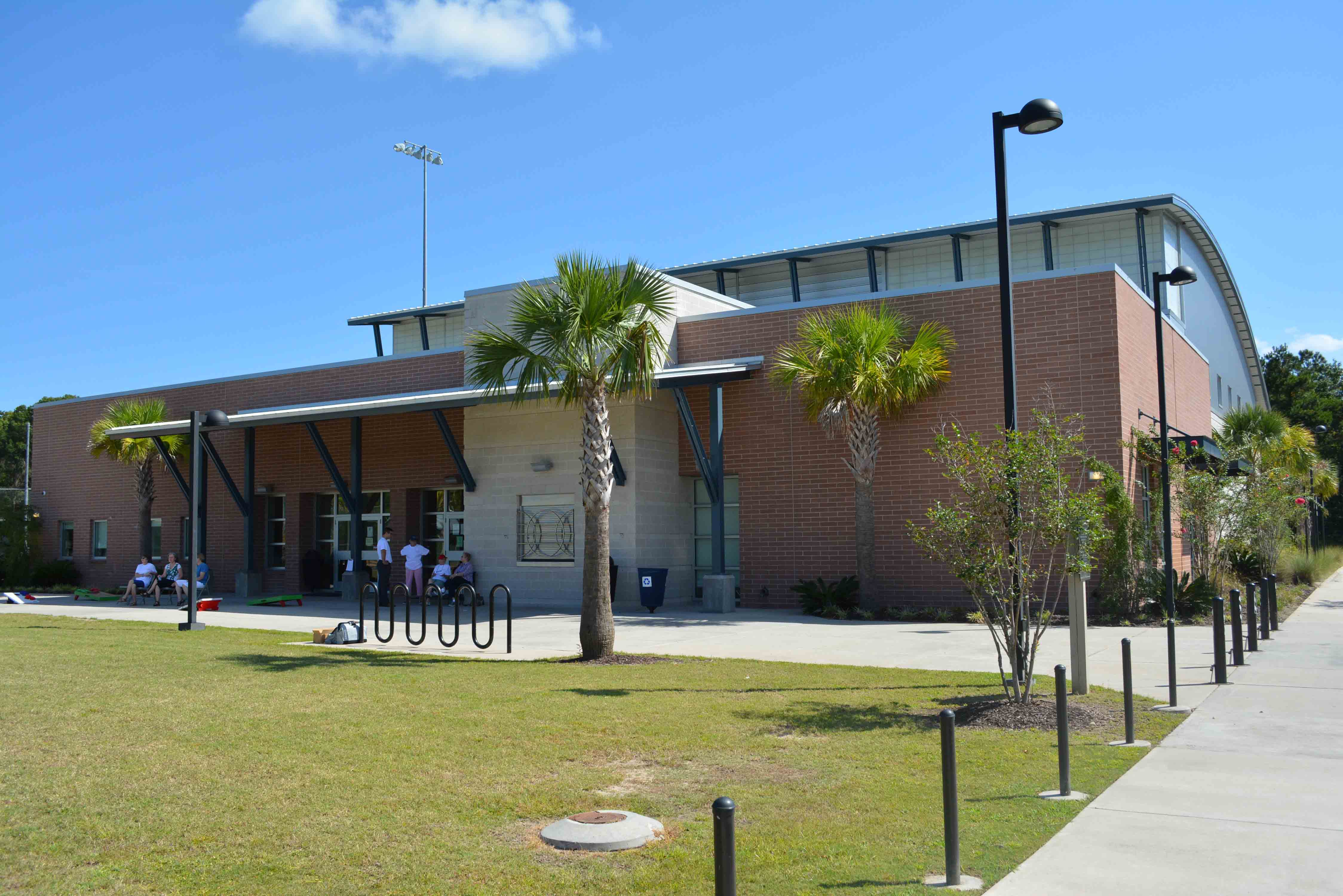
- Bees Landing Recreation Center
- Interactive map of Bees Landing Recreation Center
- Location: 1580 Ashley Gardens Blvd Charleston SC 29414
- Area: 25 acres (10 ha)
- Created: 2010
- Operator: City of Charleston
- Parking: 242 spaces

Bees Landing Recreation Center is a public park west of the Ashley in Charleston, South Carolina. Seventeen of the twenty-five acres are high ground surrounded by wetlands. The city had envisioned creating a park in West Ashley since the mid-1990s and had budgeted $2 million to acquire the property. The developer of the surrounding community, known as Grand Oaks Plantation, donated the property to the city for a park, and the city hired a consultant to develop plans.

Following a public meeting on ideal parts for the park, the city unveiled a master plan in September 2005 showing a gymnasium, a skate park, a dog park, a playground, picnic areas, an athletic field for soccer and football, nature trails, a basketball court, a concession stand, a basketball court, two tennis courts, two baseball/softball fields, and 242 parking spaces.

The park was opened in 2010. The tennis courts were named for former Mayor Arthur B. Shirmer who was not only a member of City Council and Mayor of Charleston, but an avid tennis player.
