= Hampstead Mall =

Park in Charleston, South Carolina

- Interactive map of Hampstead Mall
- Location: Columbus St. and America St., Charleston, South Carolina 29401, United States
- Coordinates: 32.796181°N 79.936248°W
- Area: 3.23 acres (1.31 ha)
- Created: 1769
- Operator: City of Charleston

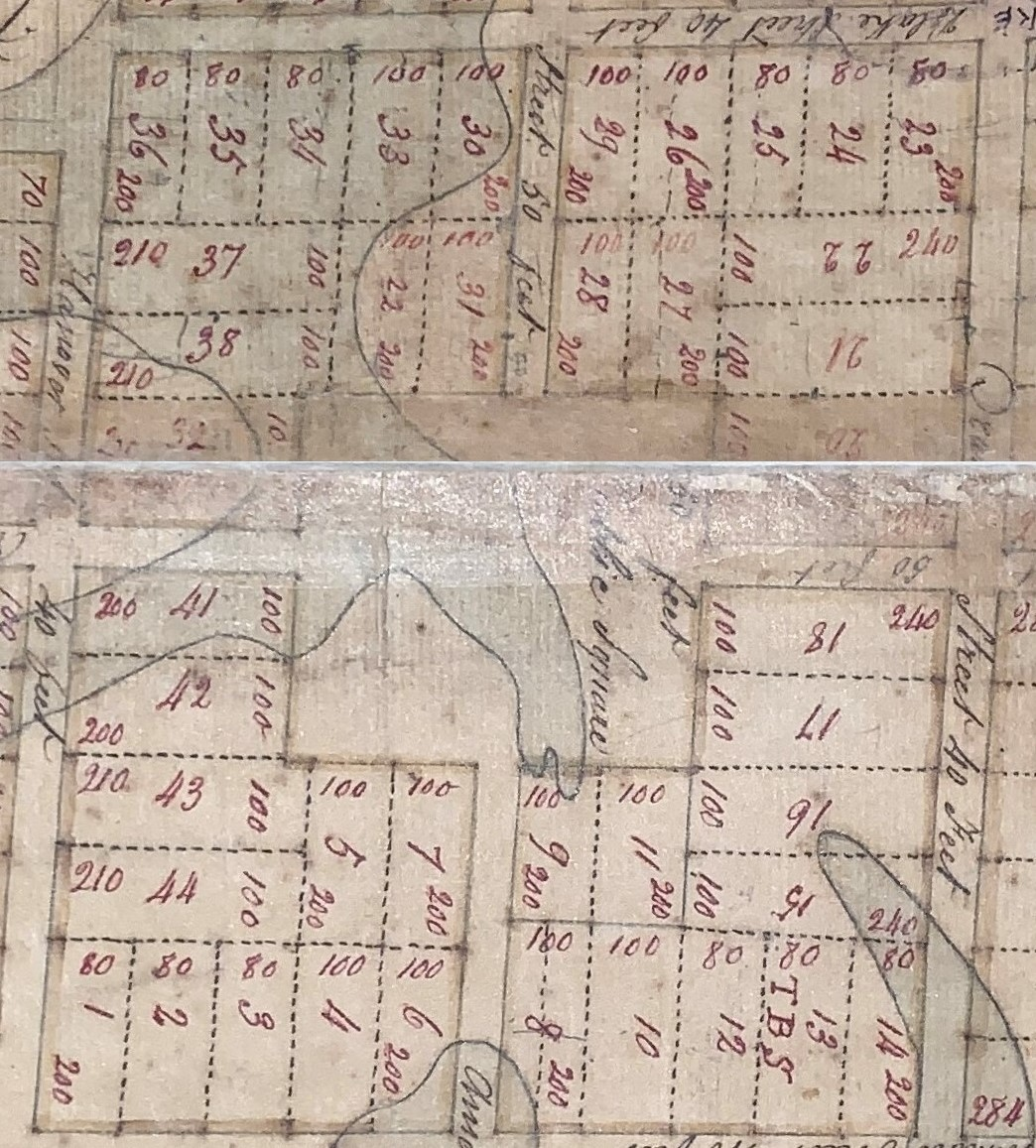
Hampstead Mall was shown in a plat filed in 1801.

Hampstead Mall is a public park in Charleston, South Carolina, of 140,625 square feet (3.23 acres) in the Hampstead Village neighborhood at the intersection of Columbus and America Streets.

The square was mentioned by Henry Laurens, who owned and subdivided the entire Hampstead Village neighborhood, as early as 1769 in advertisements for lots in his newly laid out neighborhood. He reserved the “large square . . . in the center of the town for such public uses and purposes, as shall be agreed upon by the first twenty-one purchasers of the lots, or a majority of them.”

According to early plats, Hampstead Mall was laid out at a low-lying area which had previously been marsh or creeks. By the mid-19th century, the area was still susceptible to flooding. In 1852, City Council voted to advertise for someone to level the ground in the mall.

Throughout the later 19th century, City Council undertook various improvements. In 1855, City Council voted to plant trees in the park and add a fence similar to the one surrounding Marion Square.

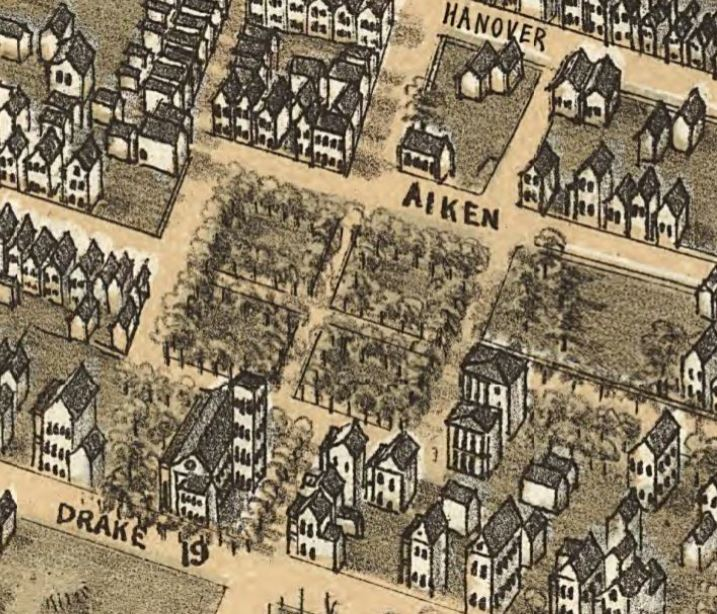
Hampstead Mall - 1872 (oriented with west to the top)

During the Civil War, however, the park was used for housing troops, and the condition of the park did not immediately rebound. After the war, the property was used as a common pasture. Columus St. and America St. ran through the park at right angles (as wide promenades, but not continuations of the streets), dividing it into four quadrants by 1867.

The "Up-Town" part of the peninsula (above Calhoun St.) had a few public green spaces, but one newspaper editorialized that in the future, much larger parks could be developed in the area of Gadsden Green along the Ashley River and that Hampstead Mall could be joined to a future park at the site of the Half-Moon Battery along the Cooper River.

City Council planned improvements to all of the city park in 1867. A drive was begun to raise money for improvements to the park from city residents in 1868; the work would include fencing with pedestrian gates and shell paths. Work was being done in June 1868. A substantial fence was added. (In 1896, the fence was removed.)

The extension of Hampstead Mall was never completed, but by 1870, the area was an enclosed pleasure ground for the neighborhood residents who could not easily travel the two miles to the Battery to enjoy walks.

The first transportation intrusion into the park occurred in 1897 when a right-of-way was granted to the Electric Railroad to run a line along Columbus St.

A bandstand was built in 1901. The bandstand was moved in 1905 because it was in the way of the addition of the railway in 1905. Electric lights replaced gas ones in 1902.

In 1905, eight shade trees on both sides of Columbus St. were removed to improve access along the street between Meeting St. and the planned Union Station on East Bay St. The matter was disputed at City Council, and a committee was eventually created to investigate the matter. The special committee's members took different positions on how to avoid the problems expected from running the rail line through the park including the risk of scaring horses and endangering children. When the matter finally came back to City Council, the body voted to sacrifice 11 more oaks to the reworking of Columbus St. but requested the Parks Commission to consider other beautification of the park.

The northwest quadrant was given to the Playground Commission for the use as a playground in 1913. The playground is named the Philip Simmons Park at Mall Playground at 68 Columbus St.

The City extended the roadway of America St. through the park in 1956 in an effort to speed traffic heading north–south on the peninsula.

In 1960, in recognition of the changing demographics of the neighborhood, the City devoted Hampstead Mall to the use of Black residents.

At a meeting of City Council on July 18, 1961, City Council approved the execution of a transfer of the northeast quadrant (and the adjacent streets to the south and east) to the Charleston County School District. If the property stopped being used "for public school purposes," then the land would revert to the city. (Minutes of Council Meetings)

In 1968, the South Carolina Medical College and the Office of Economic Opportunity had plans to build a comprehensive medical center on Hampstead Mall. The land's title was complicated by its dedication for public use; the planners and City lawyers believed that a use other than a public mall would result in the reversion of the property to the original grantor's heirs.

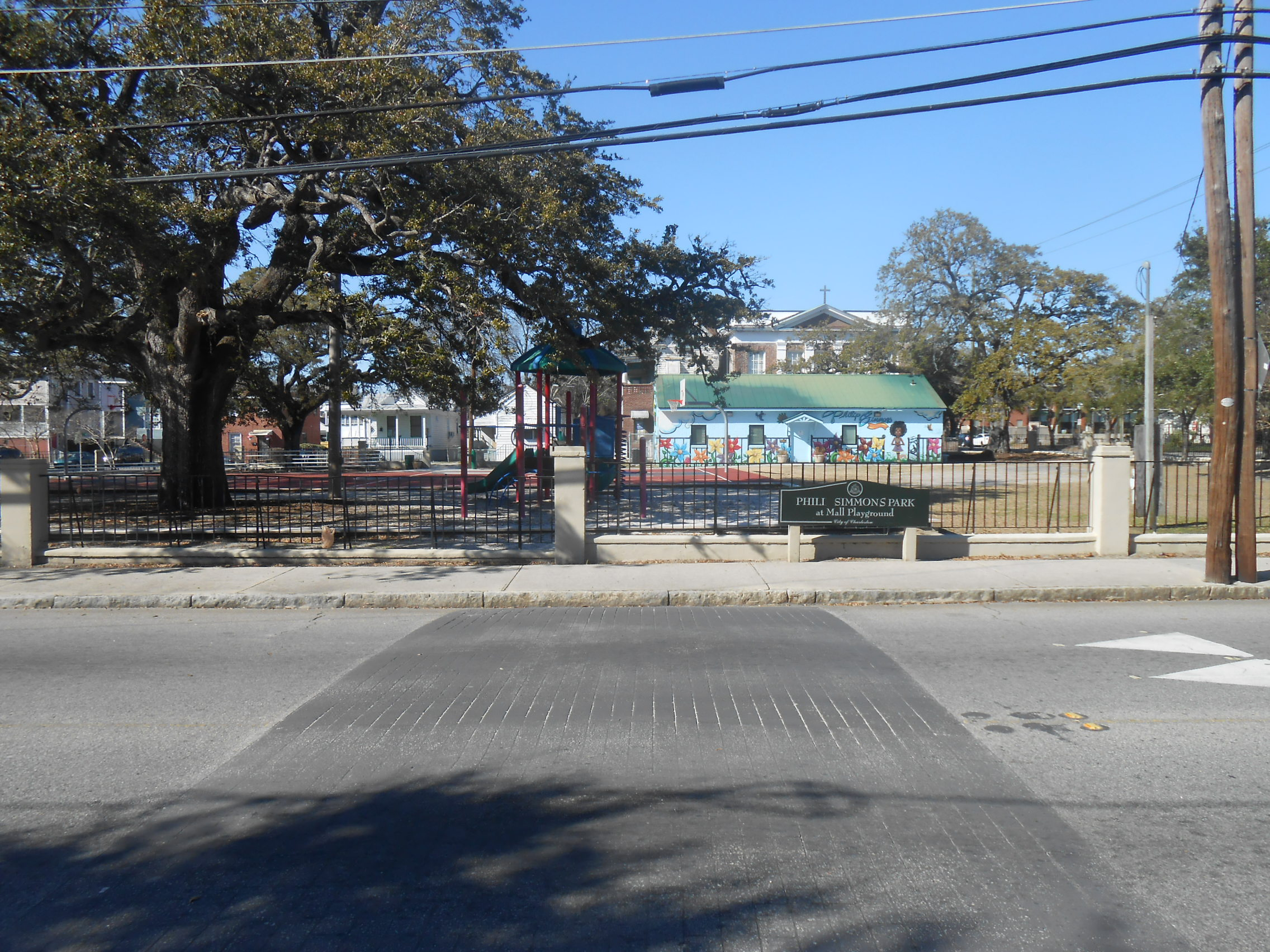
Simmons Park - 68 Columbus
