= St. Julian Devine =

American politician

Personal details
- Born: St. Julian Devine; July 5, 1911; Berkeley County, South Carolina
- Died: April 27, 2000 (aged 88); Charleston, South Carolina, U.S.
- Political party: Democratic
- Spouse: Priscilla Theresa Walton
- Children: 10

St. Julian Devine (July 5, 1911 – April 27, 2000) was an American politician from Charleston, South Carolina. Devine served on the Charleston City Council from 1967 to 1975, making him the first African American member on the council since Reconstruction. He also served as Mayor Pro Tem in 1975.

== Biography ==
Devine moved to Charleston as a child. His father, Paul Devine, was a political activist during Reconstruction. In 1924, St. Julian Devine joined the Marcus Garvey movement, a movement seeking to promote freedom for African Americans. He would go on to own several businesses including a moving company. Devine was readily active in civic life in the African American community of Charleston, participating in organizations such as the local NAACP chapter.

In 1967, Devine ran for a seat on the city council. He received the endorsement of Mayor J. Palmer Gaillard Jr. who had previously promised to endorse an African American candidate. Devine's campaign was assisted by a young Jim Clyburn who came up with the slogan "Devine for Ward Nine." Clyburn credited the Devine campaign as the reason he got into elective politics.

== St. Julian Devine Community Center ==
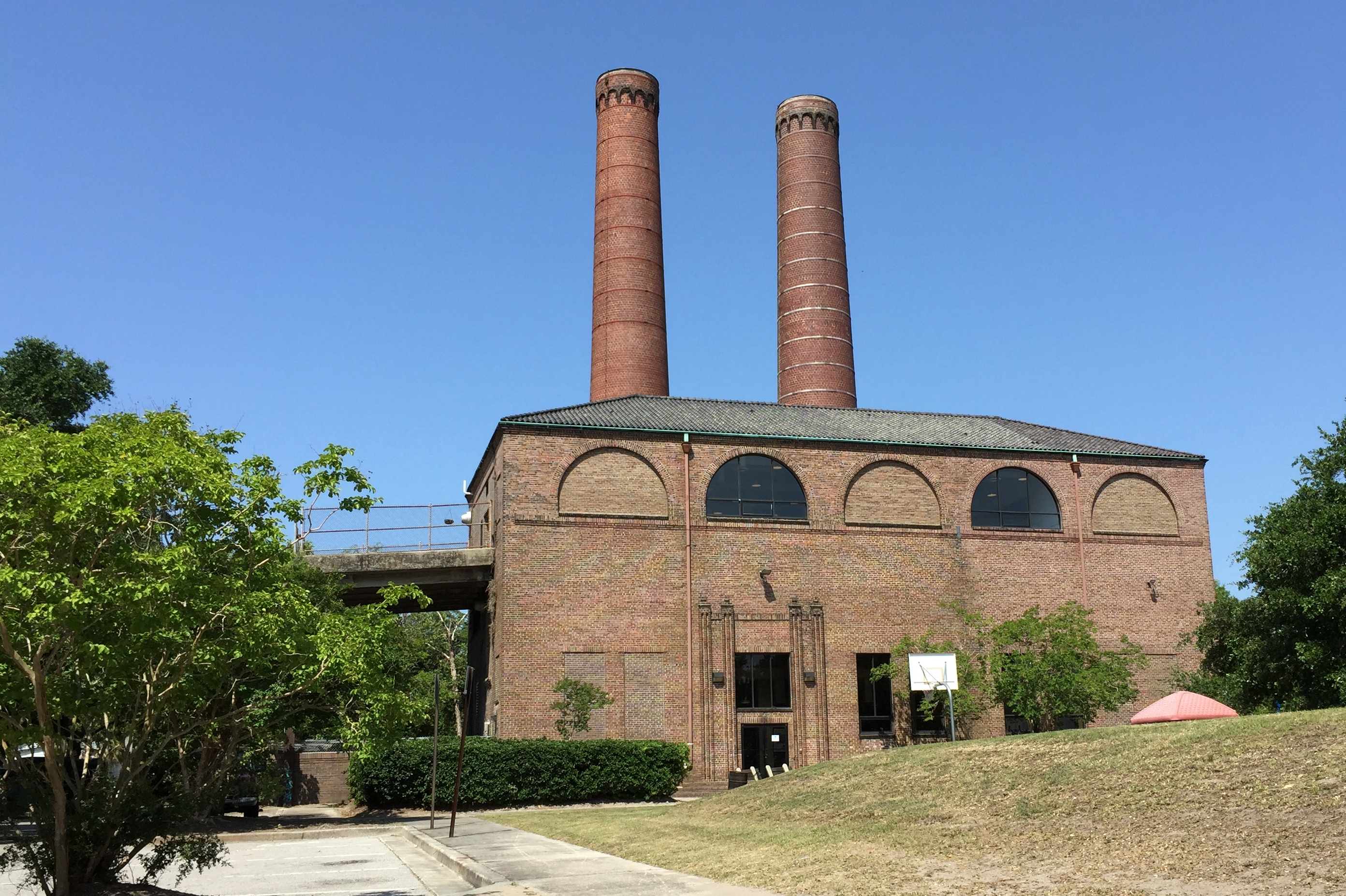
The St. Julian Devine Community Center.

The City of Charleston's old trash incinerator was converted into the St. Julian Devine Community Center which now serves the local neighborhood. In 2015, the Charleston Parks Conservancy announced plans to renovate the park. In August 2020, the city of Charleston announced plans to demolish the remaining smoke stacks from the trash incinerator, citing a report which stated that they were unstable. The city reversed course the next month and budgeted $700,000 to restore the smokestacks out of an expected cost of $3 million. The first phase of the preservation efforts was completed in late 2021. Renovations are ongoing.
