= 1816 South Carolina gubernatorial election =

- December 5, 1816
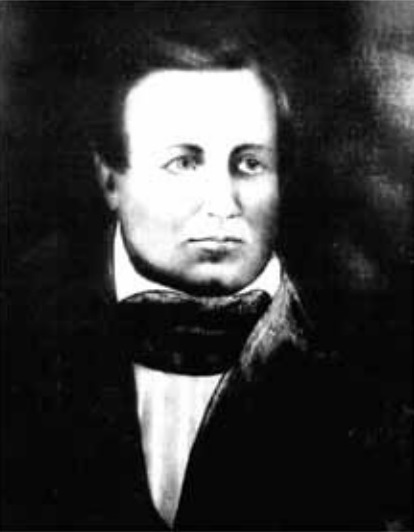

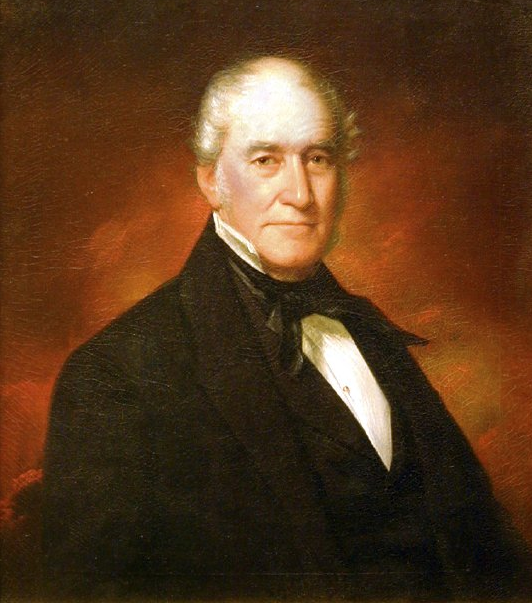
Nominee	Andrew Pickens	Thomas Bennett Jr.
Party	Democratic-Republican	Democratic-Republican
Popular vote	87	72
Percentage	54.72%	45.28%
Governor before election
David Rogerson Williams
Democratic-Republican
Elected Governor
Andrew Pickens
Democratic-Republican

The 1816 South Carolina gubernatorial election was held on December 5, 1816, in order to elect the Governor of South Carolina. Democratic-Republican candidate Andrew Pickens was elected by the South Carolina General Assembly against fellow Democratic-Republican candidate and incumbent Speaker of the South Carolina House of Representatives Thomas Bennett Jr.

== General election ==
On election day, December 5, 1816, Democratic-Republican candidate Andrew Pickens was elected by the South Carolina General Assembly by a margin of 15 votes against his opponent fellow Democratic-Republican candidate Thomas Bennett Jr., thereby retaining Democratic-Republican control over the office of Governor. Pickens was sworn in as the 46th Governor of South Carolina on January 3, 1817.

=== Results ===
South Carolina gubernatorial election, 1816
Party	Candidate	Votes	%
Democratic-Republican	Andrew Pickens	87	54.72%
Democratic-Republican	Thomas Bennett Jr.	72	45.28%
Total votes		159	100.00%
Democratic-Republican hold			
