= Robert Y. Hayne =

American politician (1791–1839)

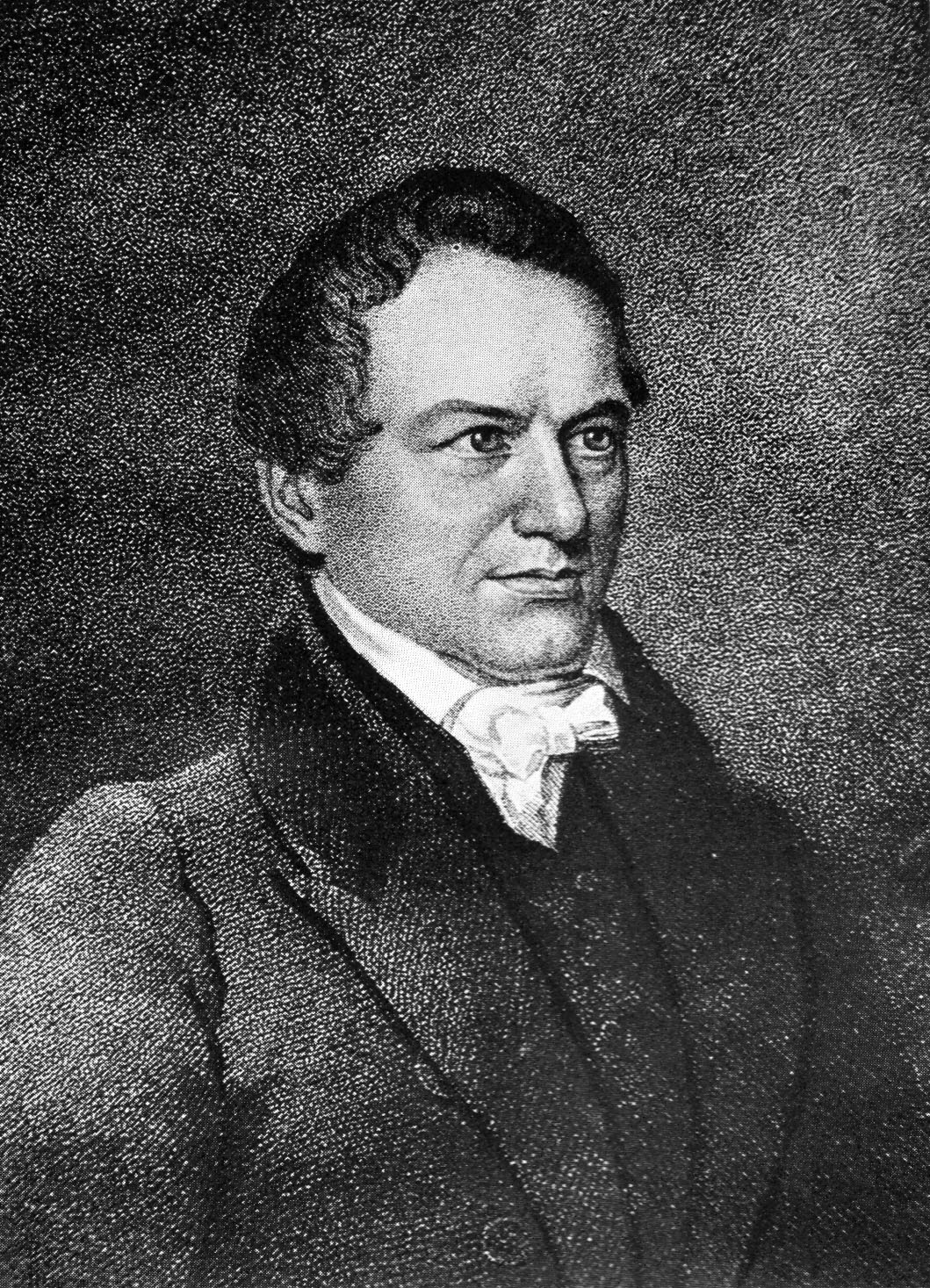

32nd Intendant of Charleston, South Carolina
- In office September 5, 1836 – September 4, 1837
- Preceded by: Edward W. North
- Succeeded by: Henry Laurens Pinckney as Mayor

54th Governor of South Carolina
- In office December 13, 1832 – December 11, 1834
- Lieutenant: Charles Cotesworth Pinckney
- Preceded by: James Hamilton Jr.
- Succeeded by: George McDuffie

United States Senator from South Carolina
- In office March 4, 1823 – December 13, 1832
- Preceded by: William Smith
- Succeeded by: John C. Calhoun

Chairman of the Senate Committee on Naval Affairs
- In office 1825–1832
- Preceded by: James Lloyd
- Succeeded by: George M. Dallas

5th Attorney General of South Carolina
- In office December 18, 1818 – December 7, 1822
- Governor: John Geddes; Thomas Bennett Jr.
- Preceded by: John Smythe Richardson Sr.
- Succeeded by: James L. Petigru

16th Speaker of the South Carolina House of Representatives
- In office November 23, 1818 – December 18, 1818
- Governor: Andrew Pickens; John Geddes
- Preceded by: Thomas Bennett Jr.
- Succeeded by: Patrick Noble

Member of the South Carolina House of Representatives from St. Philip's and St. Michael's Parish
- In office November 28, 1814 – December 18, 1818

Personal details
- Born: Robert Young Hayne; November 10, 1791 St. Pauls Parish, Hollywood, South Carolina, US
- Died: September 24, 1839 (aged 47) Asheville, North Carolina, US
- Party: Democratic
- Spouse(s): Frances Henrietta Pinckney; Rebecca Mott Alston
- Profession: Attorney, Soldier

Military service
- Allegiance: United States of America
- Branch/service: United States Army; South Carolina militia
- Rank: Captain; Quartermaster General
- Unit: 3rd South Carolina Regiment
- Battles/wars: War of 1812

Robert Young Hayne (November 10, 1791 – September 24, 1839) was an American politician. He served in the United States Senate from 1823 to 1832, as the 54th governor of South Carolina 1832–1834, and as the mayor of Charleston 1836–1837. As Senator and Governor, he was a leading figure in the Nullification Crisis and, along with John C. Calhoun and James Hamilton Jr., a vocal proponent of the doctrines of states' rights, compact theory, and nullification; his 1830 debate in the Senate with Daniel Webster is considered a defining episode in the constitutional crisis which precipitated the American Civil War.

== Early and family life ==
Robert Y. Hayne was born on November 10, 1791, to Elizabeth Peronneau and her husband William Hayne, who owned plantations farmed by enslaved labor in St. Paul Parish, Hollywood, Colleton District, South Carolina. Among his siblings, Robert Hayne had an older brother, Arthur Peronneau Hayne, and was uncle to the poet Paul Hamilton Hayne (1830-1886). Hayne received a private education suitable for his class, then studied law in the office of Langdon Cheves in Charleston.

On November 3, 1813, he married Frances Henrietta Pinckney (1790–1818), daughter of prominent lawyer and former governor Charles Pinckney. They had a daughter, Frances Henrietta Pinckney Sharpe (1818–1875). Hayne would later give his daughter Frances a plantation in Tamassee, South Carolina, when she married the local Pendleton, South Carolina, court clerk, Elam Sharpe, shortly before Hayne's unexpected death in 1839.

In 1820, after his first wife's death from childbirth complications, Hayne married Rebecca Brewton Allston. Her father, William Alston, gave her a lot on lower King Street, where Hayne built a house (today's 4 Ladson Street). Robert and Rebecca Hayne had two sons: William Alston Hayne (1821-1901) and Arthur P. Hayne (1822-1888).

== Lawyer, officer, planter, railroad president ==
Hayne was admitted to the bar in 1812 and practiced law in Charleston. During the War of 1812 against Great Britain, he was a Lieutenant in the Charleston Cadet Infantry. He rose to Captain in the Third South Carolina Regiment. Hayne later served as the Quartermaster General of the state militia. By 1836, he had risen in the state militia ranks to major general.

In the 1820 census, Hayne enslaved 118 people in Georgetown, South Carolina (half of them engaged in agriculture), another 50 enslaved people in Colleton County, South Carolina, and 19 more in Charleston, South Carolina. In the 1830 census, he enslaved 17 people in Charleston. Hayne was mentioned in American Slavery As It Is, an abolitionist book published in 1839. He is given as an example of slavers who disregard marriages of enslaved African Americans. The book reprinted a signed advertisement Hayne placed in a newspaper that sought help capturing an escaped man. Hayne's advertisement suggested that the fugitive may be heading to a neighboring county where the enslaved man's wife and children live.

Hayne actively promoted South Carolina's industrial development, including the South Carolina Canal and Railroad Company, which in 1835 expanded westward toward the Appalachian Mountains under Hayne's plan to link Charleston's port to Memphis, Tennessee, and the Mississippi River. Hayne was president of the Louisville, Cincinnati and Charleston Railroad until his death and was succeeded as its president by James Gadsden. The LCCR bought the SCCRC's stock in 1839. The two railroads merged in 1844 but never completed the track as expected, only finishing about 60 miles to Columbia, South Carolina, in addition to connections to Camden, South Carolina, in 1848 and Atlanta, Georgia, in 1853.

== Political career ==
A Democrat, Hayne was elected to the South Carolina House of Representatives and served from 1814 to 1818, including as Speaker of the House in 1818. Hayne was Attorney General of South Carolina from 1818 to 1822. During his tenure, the trial of Denmark Vesey occurred in Charleston after a purported slave rebellion was thwarted. Governor Thomas Bennett, unsupportive of the city-appointed court handling the trial, asked Hayne for his legal opinion. Hayne advised Bennett that the "Magna Charta and Habeas Corpus and indeed all the provisions of our Constitution in favour of Liberty, are intended for freemen only" and that the Governor of South Carolina could not examine "judicial errors."

In 1822, South Carolina's legislature elected Hayne to the United States Senate. He was reelected in 1828 and served from March 4, 1823, to December 13, 1832. From 1825 to 1832, he chaired the Senate Committee on Naval Affairs. Martin Van Buren, a contemporary of Hayne's in the Senate, commented on how Hayne's demeanor there evolved from one of self-confident outspokenness at first to one of outward modesty more in line with the senatorial culture of respect for seniority:

He entered at once into the debates and without the slightest embarrassment spoke fluently, intelligibly, sometimes forcibly but often without the slightest effect. Whilst he was himself treated with proper respect, motions, arguments and opinions which he deemed very conclusive, were sometimes disposed of in a summary and unceremonious way not [at] all consistent with the weight to which he deemed them entitled. * * * * No one informed him of the cause, but he did not fail to discover it himself, or to take promptly the steps to remedy the evil. From originating propositions himself he became obviously desirous to follow the lead of others — instead of the usual confident and ex-cathedra way of advancing his opinions they were now expressed with diffidence in moderate terms with well conceived expressions of deference to those of the elder and more experienced members of the Senate. The change was observed and appreciated.

In 1832, under James Hamilton Jr. as governor, Hayne served as Chairman of South Carolina's nullification convention. Hamilton and Hayne argued that states could "nullify" federal laws with which they disagreed. Eighty percent of its 162 delegates voted to nullify federal tariffs of 1828 and 1832 and for the Ordinance of Nullification. A temporary compromise was reached between the federal government and South Carolina in 1833.

Hayne resigned from the Senate to accept election by the legislature as Governor of South Carolina in 1832, serving one term into 1834. He was succeeded in the senate by John C. Calhoun, who resigned his post as Vice President of the United States to take the seat. From 1836 to 1837, he served as Mayor of Charleston, South Carolina.

== Death and legacy ==
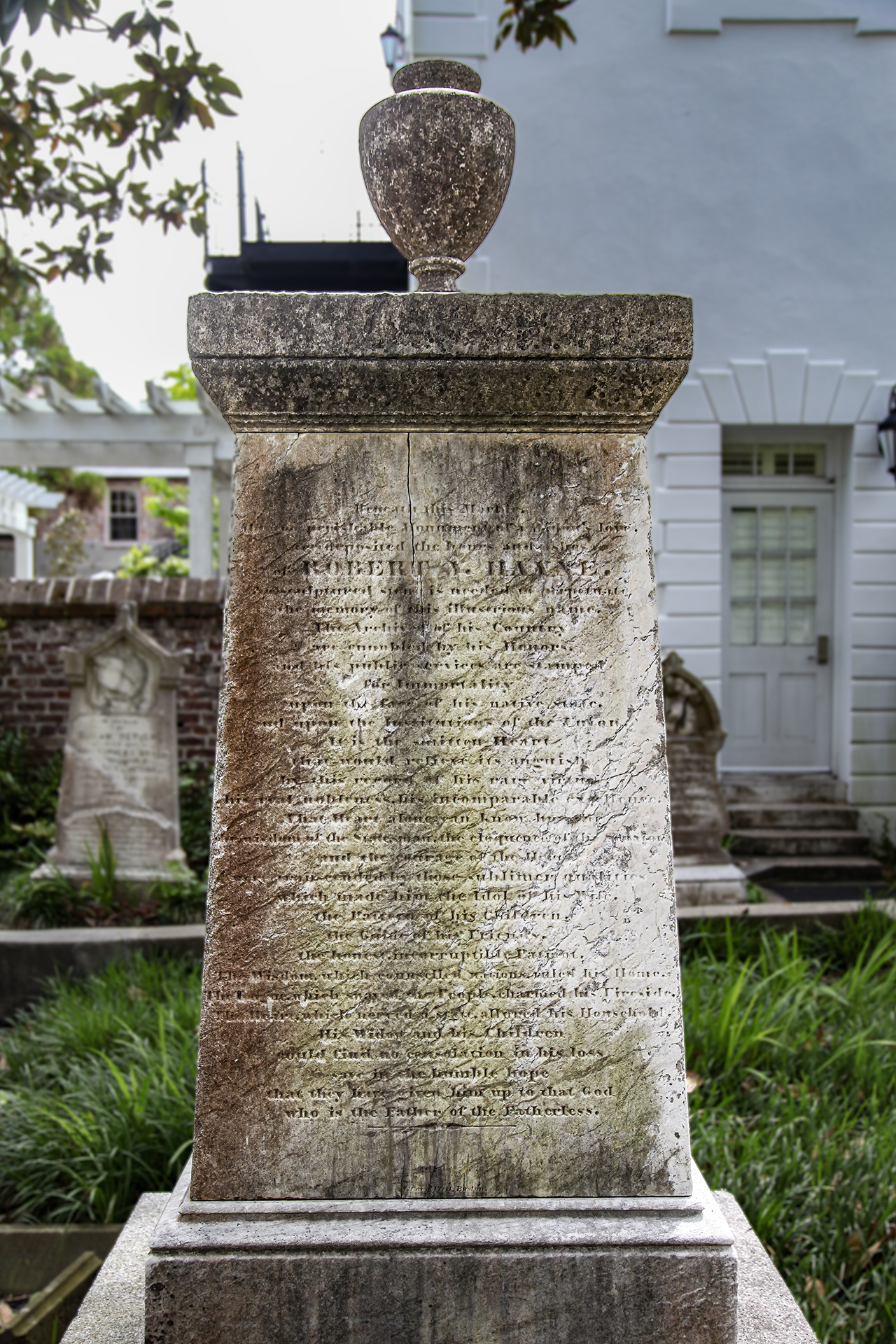
Robert Y. Hayne's grave, St. Michael's Church, Charleston, SC

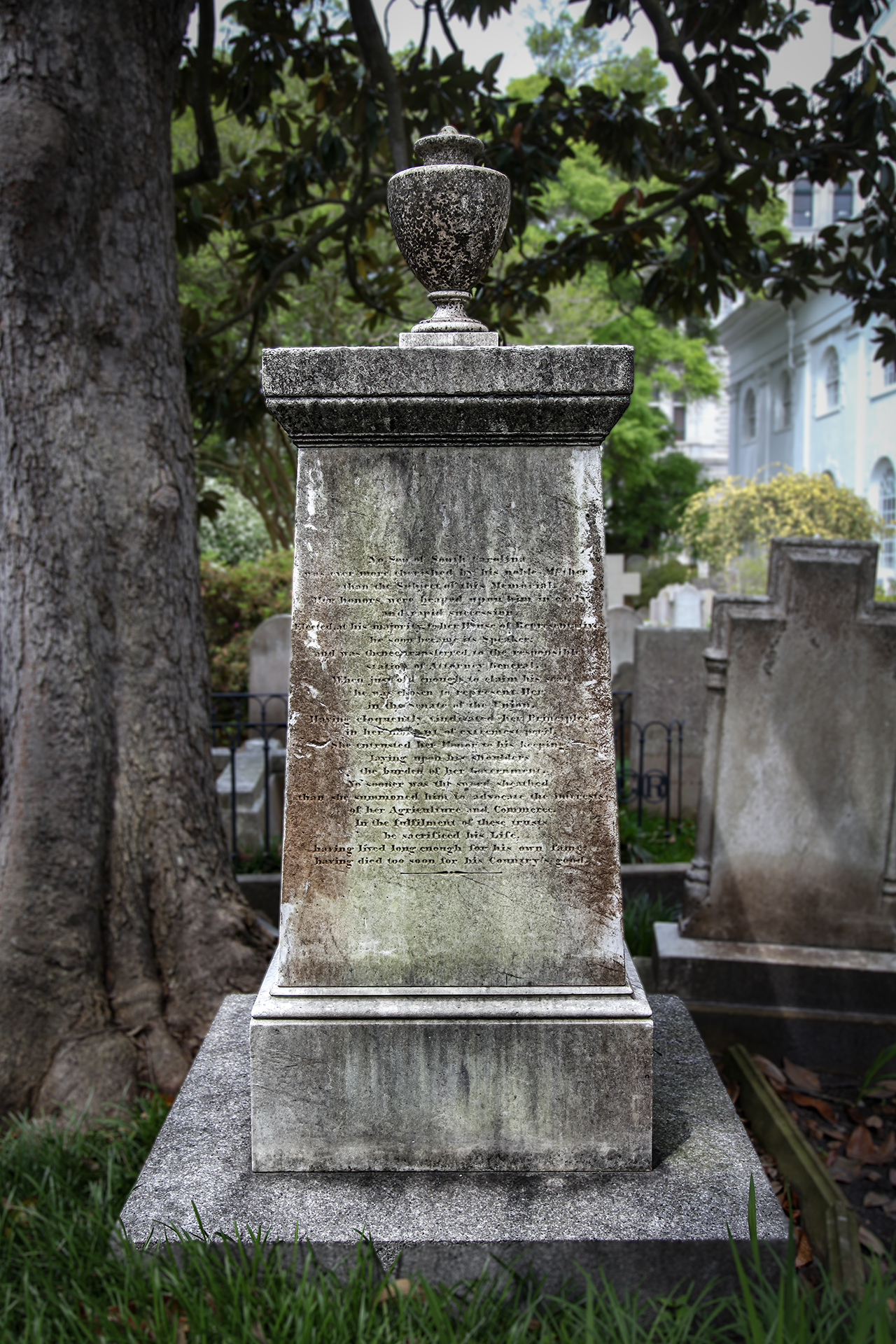
Reverse side of Robert Y Hayne's Gravestone at Saint Michael's Church, Charleston, SC

Hayne died in Asheville, North Carolina, on September 24, 1839. He is buried at St. Michael's Church cemetery in Charleston.

His transcontinental railroad dreams never materialized. His son-in-law, Capt. Elam Sharpe Jr. fought for the Confederacy against the United States in the American Civil War as a member of the First South Carolina Cavalry, Hampton's Legion, surviving the war. However, he and his family sold their plantations and invested the proceeds in Confederate bonds. After the war, the family's finances were dire, and Sharpe moved to Tennessee, then Dallas, Texas, where he became a Presbyterian minister.

Hayne's descendants sold the Ladson Street house in 1863, but it still exists today, albeit moved and renovated in 1890.

Hayne's nephew, Paul Hamilton Hayne, was a poet and South Carolina's poet laureate who moved to Georgia after the Civil War. In 1878, he published a biography of Hayne.

The World War II Liberty ship SS Robert Y. Hayne was named in his honor.

== Political views ==
Hayne was an ardent free-trader and an uncompromising advocate of states' rights. He consistently argued that slavery was a domestic institution and should be dealt with only by the individual states. He opposed the federal government's plan to send delegates to the Panama Congress, which was organized by Simón Bolívar to develop a united North and South American policy towards Spain, including the end of slavery in Spain's former colonies. (After achieving independence, Mexico abolished slavery in 1824.) Objecting to any federal effort to curtail slavery, Hayne said, "The moment the federal government shall make the unhallowed attempt to interfere with the domestic concerns of the states; those states will consider themselves driven from the Union."

He opposed 1824, 1828, and 1832 protectionist federal tariff bills. In 1828, in response to the changing economic landscape in Massachusetts (there was a shift from farming towards mass production in factories), Daniel Webster backed a bill to increase tariffs on imported goods, a measure that southern politicians opposed. Hayne spoke in opposition to the bill, Webster responded, and the ensuing series of back-and-forth Senate speeches became known as the Webster-Hayne debate.

The debate arose over the "Foot resolution," introduced on December 29, 1829 by Senator Samuel A. Foot of Connecticut. Foot's proposal called for a federal government study into restricting the sale of public lands to those lands already surveyed and available for sale, preventing states from conducting further land sales. Whether the federal government had the authority to take this action called into question the relationship between the powers of the federal government and the governments of the individual states.

Hayne contended that the United States Constitution was only a compact among the states and that any state could nullify any federal law which it considered to be in contradiction.

Webster argued for the supremacy of the federal government and the Constitution and against nullification and secession. He concluded his Second Reply to Hayne with the memorable phrases, "Liberty and union, now and forever, one and inseparable."

Legal offices
| Preceded by John Smythe Richardson | Attorney General of South Carolina; 1818–1822 | Succeeded by James L. Petigru |
U.S. Senate
| Preceded by William Smith | U.S. senator (Class 2) from South Carolina; 1823–1832; Served alongside: John Gaillard, William Harper, William Smith, Stephen Decatur Miller | Succeeded by John C. Calhoun |
Political offices
| Preceded by James Hamilton Jr. | Governor of South Carolina; 1832–1834 | Succeeded by George McDuffie |
