= Charles Cochran =

Charles Cochran may refer to:

- Charles F. Cochran (1846–1906), U.S. representative from Missouri
- Charles B. Cochran (1872–1951), British theatrical manager
- Charles Cochran (South Carolina politician) (1766–1833), intendant (mayor) of Charleston, South Carolina
- Charles Cochran (cricketer) (1800–1885), English cricketer
