= Governor Pickens =

Governor Pickens may refer to:

- Andrew Pickens (governor) (1779–1838), 46th Governor of South Carolina
- Francis Wilkinson Pickens (1805/1807–1869), 69th Governor of South Carolina
- Israel Pickens (1780–1827), 3rd Governor of Alabama
