= Thomas Roper =

Thomas Roper may refer to:

- Thomas Roper (MP) (1534–1598/34-98), MP for New Shoreham, Sussex and Newport, Cornwall, England
- Thomas Roper, 1st Viscount Baltinglass (died 1638), Viscount Baltinglass
- Thomas Roper, 2nd Viscount Baltinglass (d. c. 1670)
- Thomas Roper (mayor) (1760–1829), mayor of Charleston, South Carolina
- Tom Roper (1945–2023), Australian politician
- Tom Roper, character in Born to the Saddle
