= Daniel Stevens =

Daniel, Dan or Danny Stevens may refer to:

- Daniel Bartlett Stevens (1837–1924), Wisconsin politician
- Daniel D. Stevens (1839–1916), US Navy sailor during the American Civil War
- Dan Stevens (born 1982), British actor
- Dan Stevens (musician) (born 1978), American punk rock musician
- E. Dan Stevens (born 1943), member of the Michigan House of Representatives
- Dan Stevens (Minnesota politician) (born 1950), member of the Minnesota State Senate
- Danny Stevens (Australian footballer) (born 1976), Australian rules footballer
- Danny Stevens (footballer, born 1986), English footballer
- Daniel Stevens (politician) (1746–1835), intendant (mayor) of Charleston, South Carolina
- Danny Stevens (character), a character from the American science fiction web television series For All Mankind
