= SS Robert Y. Hayne =

Liberty ship of WWII

History

United States
- Name: Robert Y. Hayne
- Namesake: Robert Y. Hayne
- Owner: War Shipping Administration (WSA)
- Operator: Agwilines Inc.
- Ordered: as type (EC2-S-C1) hull, MC hull 1198
- Builder: St. Johns River Shipbuilding Company, Jacksonville, Florida
- Cost: $2,195,834
- Yard number: 6
- Way number: 6
- Laid down: 2 November 1942
- Launched: 30 May 1943
- Sponsored by: Mrs. James C. Merrill, Jr.
- Completed: 20 July 1943
- Identification: Call sign: KIVW
- Fate: Sold for commercial use, 19 May 1947, withdrawn from fleet, 23 May 1947

Italy
- Name: Citta Di Savona
- Owner: Societa Saicen
- Fate: Sold, 1958

Liberia
- Name: Centreport
- Owner: T.J. Verrando and Co.
- Operator: Lloyd Arfrica, LTD.
- Fate: Sold for scrapping, 1971

General characteristics
- Class & type: Liberty ship; type EC2-S-C1, standard
- Tonnage: 10,865 LT DWT; 7,176 GRT
- Displacement: 3,380 long tons (3,434 t) (light); 14,245 long tons (14,474 t) (max)
- Length: 441 feet 6 inches (135 m) oa; 416 feet (127 m) pp; 427 feet (130 m) lwl
- Beam: 57 feet (17 m)
- Draft: 27 ft 9.25 in (8.4646 m)
- Installed power: 2 × Oil fired 450 °F (232 °C) boilers, operating at 220 psi (1,500 kPa); 2,500 hp (1,900 kW)
- Propulsion: 1 × triple-expansion steam engine, (manufactured by General Machinery Corp., Hamilton, Ohio); 1 × screw propeller
- Speed: 11.5 knots (21.3 km/h; 13.2 mph)
- Capacity: 562,608 cubic feet (15,931 m^{3}) (grain); 499,573 cubic feet (14,146 m^{3}) (bale)
- Complement: 38–62 USMM; 21–40 USNAG
- Armament: Varied by ship; Bow-mounted 3-inch (76 mm)/50-caliber gun; Stern-mounted 4-inch (102 mm)/50-caliber gun; 2–8 × single 20-millimeter (0.79 in) Oerlikon anti-aircraft (AA) cannons and/or, 2–8 × 37-millimeter (1.46 in) M1 AA guns

SS Robert Y. Hayne was a Liberty ship built in the United States during World War II. She was named after Robert Y. Hayne, an American lawyer, planter and politician. He served in the United States Senate from 1823 to 1832, as Governor of South Carolina 1832–1834, and as Mayor of Charleston, South Carolina 1836–1837.

== Construction ==
Robert Y. Hayne was laid down on 2 November 1942, under a Maritime Commission (MARCOM) contract, MC hull 1198, by the St. Johns River Shipbuilding Company, Jacksonville, Florida; she was sponsored by Mrs. James C. Merrill Jr., the wife of a Merrill-Stevens Drydock & Repair Co. official, she was launched on 30 May 1943.

== History ==
She was allocated to Agwilines Inc., on 20 July 1943. On 30 May 1946, she was placed in the Hudson River Reserve Fleet, Jones Point, New York. She was sold for commercial use, on 19 May 1947, to Italy, and renamed Citta Di Savona. She was withdrawn from the fleet, 6 June 1947.

== Bibliography ==
- "St. John's River Shipbuilding, Jacksonville FL". www.ShipbuildingHistory.com. 16 October 2010.
- Maritime Administration. "Robert Y. Hayne". Ship History Database Vessel Status Card. U.S. Department of Transportation, Maritime Administration.
- Davies, James (May 2004). "Specifications (As-Built)" (PDF). p. 23.
- "SS Robert Y. Hayne".
