= E. Edward Wehman Jr. =

American politician

56th Mayor of Charleston
- In office June 13, 1944 – 1947
- Preceded by: Henry Whilden Lockwood
- Succeeded by: William McG. Morrison

Personal details
- Born: December 27, 1891
- Died: May 1, 1964 (aged 72)
- Spouse: Helen Stone Tilley

E. Edward Wehman Jr. was the fifty-sixth mayor of Charleston, South Carolina, completing the term of Henry Whilden Lockwood and not running for reelection. He was born on December 27, 1891, in Charleston, South Carolina to E.E. and Bertha T. Wehman. He attended West Point in 1911 and 1912 and received a bachelor of science degree from the University of South Carolina. When Dwight D. Eisenhower, a classmate of Wehman's at West Point, was elected president, Wehman served as one of the eight electors from South Carolina.

Wehman was elected 16-7 from among the member of Charleston City Council to complete the unfinished term of Henry Whilden Lockwood. He did not seek reelection following more than three years in office and instead returned to his insurance business.

Wehman died on May 1, 1964.

Political offices
Preceded by Henry Whilden Lockwood	Mayor of Charleston, South Carolina; 1944–1947	Succeeded by William McG. Morrison
