= James Hamilton Jr. =

Governor of South Carolina (1786–1857)

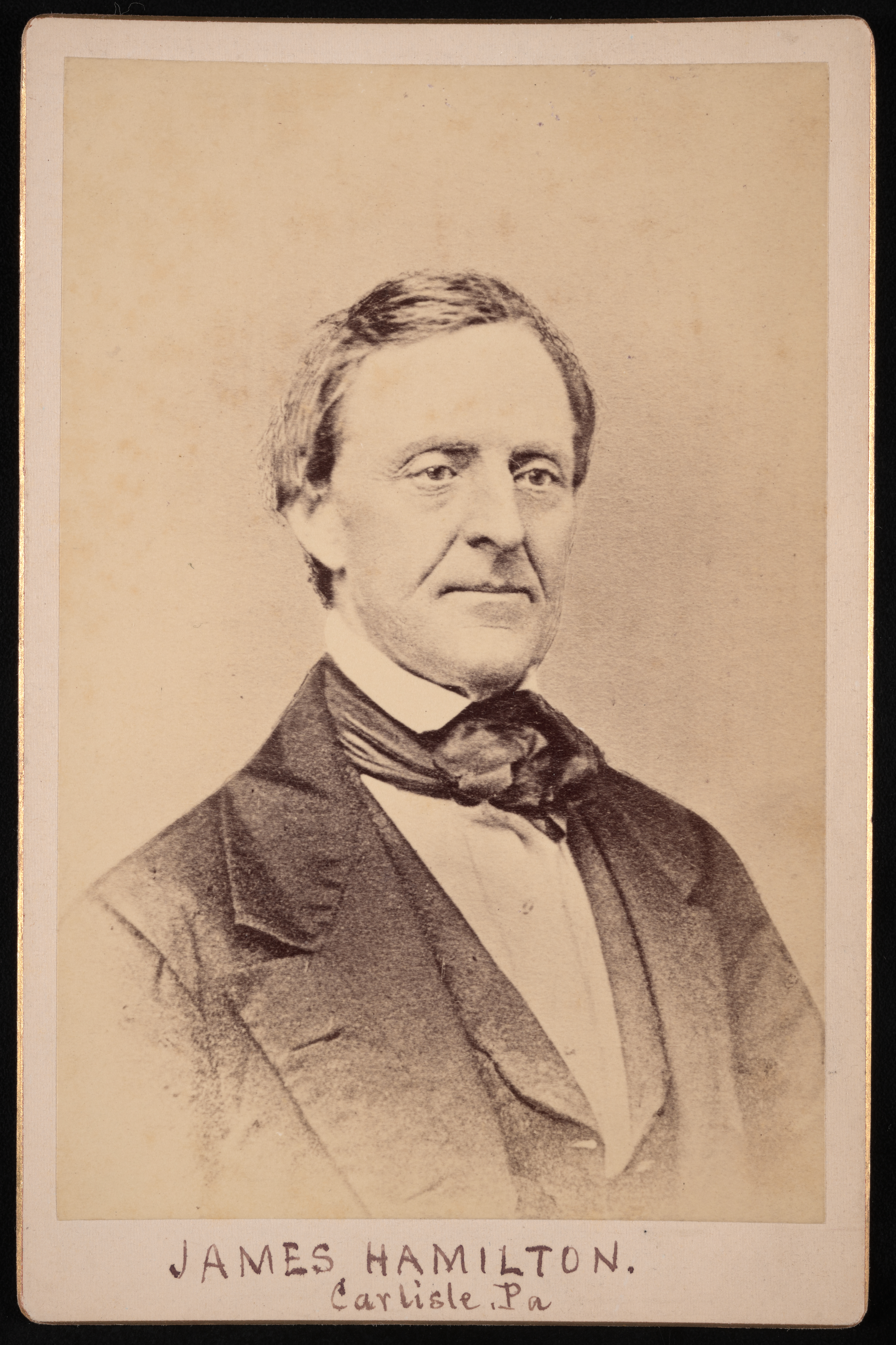

53rd Governor of South Carolina
- In office December 9, 1830 – December 10, 1832
- Lieutenant: Patrick Noble
- Preceded by: Stephen Decatur Miller
- Succeeded by: Robert Y. Hayne

Member of the U.S. House of Representatives from South Carolina's 2nd district
- In office December 13, 1822 – March 3, 1829
- Preceded by: William Lowndes
- Succeeded by: Robert Woodward Barnwell

25th Mayor of Charleston
- In office 1821–1822
- Preceded by: Elias Horry
- Succeeded by: John Geddes

Member of the South Carolina Senate from St. Philip's and St. Michael's Parish
- In office November 28, 1836 – November 26, 1838

Member of the South Carolina House of Representatives from St. Philip's and St. Michael's Parish
- In office November 27, 1820 – November 25, 1822

Personal details
- Born: May 8, 1786 Charleston, South Carolina, U.S.
- Died: November 15, 1857 (aged 71) Gulf of Mexico, off the coast of Avery Island, Louisiana
- Party: States' Rights Democrat
- Other political affiliations: Nullifier Party

James Hamilton Jr. (May 8, 1786 – November 15, 1857) was an American lawyer and politician. He represented South Carolina in the U.S. Congress (1822–1829) and served as its 53rd governor of South Carolina (1830–1832). Prior to that, Hamilton achieved widespread recognition and public approval for his actions as Intendant (mayor) of the city of Charleston, South Carolina in 1822, during the period when plans for a slave rising were revealed. As governor, he led the state during the Nullification Crisis of 1832, at the peak of his power.

Hamilton organized a city militia in June 1822 to arrest suspects, including the purported free black leader Denmark Vesey, supported the City Council in commissioning a Court of Magistrates and Freeholders, and defended their actions, including ordering the execution of Vesey and 34 other blacks, and deporting of tens of others. He helped shape the public perception of the Court proceedings and the reasons for the revolt, as well as gaining legislation in 1822 for more controls on slaves and free people of color. Because of problems with crippling debt after 1839, Hamilton's reputation suffered.

== Early life and career ==
James Hamilton was born on May 8, 1786, in Charleston, South Carolina, to James and Elizabeth (Lynch) Hamilton, both of the Lowcountry planter elite; his mother was the daughter of Congressman Thomas Lynch and sister of Thomas Lynch Jr.

His parents sent him to preparatory schools in New England; he studied in Newport, Rhode Island, and Dedham, Massachusetts, before returning to Charleston. In the city he read law under prominent attorneys Daniel Huger and William Drayton. Hamilton passed the bar and went into practice in Drayton's office; he later was in partnership with James L. Petigru.

== Marriage and family ==
On November 15, 1813, Hamilton married Elizabeth Mathews Heyward, daughter of wealthy low country South Carolina planter Daniel Heyward and Ann SarahTrezevant; her paternal grandfather was Thomas Heyward Jr., a South Carolinian who served in the Continental Congress and signed the Declaration of Independence. She brought three plantations and approximately 200 slaves to the marriage. The couple had eleven children, ten males and one female.

== Political career ==
Hamilton entered politics in the state. He was elected in 1818 to the South Carolina state House of Representatives, serving from 1819 until early 1822.

That year Hamilton was elected as Intendant, or mayor, of the city of Charleston. He was serving when plans were revealed in the spring to white officials of a slave "rising," reportedly led by Denmark Vesey, a free black carpenter and former slave, who was a leader of the large AME African-American Church. Hamilton quickly organized a militia to defend the city and round up and arrest slave suspects. Its forces roamed the city and its environs for weeks.

With Hamilton's leadership, the City Council commissioned a Court of Magistrates and Freeholders to review the cases, hear testimony, and determine guilt and punishment. They conducted their proceedings in secret, beginning in the middle of June. Suspects were arrested throughout the city. On July 1, the court published its initial findings related to the first 30 suspects: declaring Denmark Vesey and five slaves guilty of conspiracy and condemning them to death. They were executed on July 2 by hanging. In total, most during the next weeks, the courts examined a total of 131 men, convicted a total of 67 men of conspiracy and hanged 35 (including Vesey and others of the first group), through July 1822. A total of 31 men were transported, 27 reviewed and acquitted, and 38 questioned and released.

The court proceedings were controversial, criticized by United States Supreme Court Justice William Johnson and South Carolina Governor Thomas Bennett Jr. for their secrecy and lack of due process, as defendants were not allowed to confront accusers and witnesses were promised secrecy. But, Hamilton captured the public opinion of the events, publishing a 46-page article in August, taking credit for the city's actions in preventing a huge uprising and bloodbath. He also shaped the Court's official Report of its proceedings, published in October. Historian Lacy K. Ford has said, "the balance of the evidence clearly points to the exaggeration of the plot and the misappropriation of its lessons by Hamilton, the Court, and their allies for their own political advantage." Robert Tinkler, biographer of Hamilton, thinks he was ruthless about pursuing suspects because he believed the plot was real.

Hamilton built his political career on these events. In the fall, he lobbied the legislature to gain his agenda of increasing controls on slaves and free blacks in the state. He opposed the increasing paternalism in slave treatment which was based on Christian teachings. Hamilton was successful in gaining passage of state laws to achieve his goals, including the Seaman's Act of 1822, which required free black sailors to be imprisoned when their ships were in port in Charleston, to prevent their coming into contact with slaves in the city. As this violated international treaties, the law caused conflict with the federal government. Hamilton upheld the state's right to make such a law, but it was declared unconstitutional. Hamilton gained increased restrictions on free blacks, with a state law that prohibited them from returning to the state to live if they left for any reason, and controls on slave worship and gatherings. He ordered the congregation of the AME Church to be dispersed, and the building destroyed. The minister Morris Brown thanked Hamilton for helping him escape the state; historian Robert L. Paquette credits Hamilton with helping contain white vigilantism.

When South Carolina Congressman William Lowndes resigned from the U.S. Congress in May 1822, Hamilton was well known and had much public support. He was appointed to complete Lowndes' term, starting his congressional career on December 13, 1822, while still serving as mayor. He was elected to the U.S. House of Representatives in 1824 to a full term, and re-elected in 1826 and 1828, serving until 1829. He had led opposition to the administration of John Quincy Adams and opposed the Tariff Acts of 1824 and 1828. Increasingly at odds with the national government, Hamilton declined to be nominated for another term and returned to his home state to prepare for confrontation.

Hamilton was elected by the state legislature as Governor of South Carolina in 1830, and built up the States' Rights and Free Trade Party. He led the state during the Nullification Crisis of 1832, when more than 80% of the state convention's 162 delegates voted to nullify the federal tariffs of 1828 and 1832. After Robert Y. Hayne was elected by the legislature to governor, he commissioned Hamilton as a brigadier general in the state's militia. Hamilton prepared for possibly defending the state against federal forces on nullification.

Interested in supporting the expansion of slavery in western territories, Hamilton personally lent $216,000 to the young Republic of Texas in the 1830s. Subsequent to that, he made a number of poor business decisions, aggravated by the Panic of 1837, and leaving him deeply in debt for hundreds of thousands of dollars by 1839 – a condition often shared by other planters. Perhaps because his condition reminded them unpleasantly of their own, Hamilton's struggles with debt and poor decision-making caused a steep decline over the next twenty years in his reputation among the planter class in South Carolina. At the time of his death in 1857, he received no recognition from his home state.

He was appointed as loan commissioner for Texas by President Mirabeau Lamar and traveled to Europe to try to secure much-needed credit for the new republic. He did succeed in negotiating some commercial treaties. He also gained diplomatic recognition for Texas from Great Britain and the Netherlands. After being replaced in 1842, Hamilton struggled over several years to try to obtain federal reimbursement for his personal loan to Texas.

Hamilton moved with his family to Texas in 1855, nearly ten years after the republic had been annexed and made a U.S. state. In 1857, while Hamilton was returning by the steamboat Opelousas to Texas from Washington, D.C., his ship was hit by the Galveston and exploded on fire; it sank within half an hour off Avery Island, Louisiana, in the Gulf of Mexico. Twenty people died from the Opelousas, including Hamilton after he gave up his seat in a lifeboat to a woman and her child.

== Legacy ==
- Hamilton helped gain approval by the South Carolina legislature to authorize and appropriate $100,000 for an armory and defensive installation in Charleston against slave revolts; what became known as the Citadel was completed in the city in 1829.
- Hamilton was the first governor of South Carolina to have his photograph taken.
- Hamilton County, Texas is named in his honor.

U.S. House of Representatives
Preceded by William Lowndes	Member of the U.S. House of Representatives from South Carolina's 2nd congressional district 1822–1829	Succeeded by Robert Woodward Barnwell
Political offices
Preceded by Elias Horry	Mayor of Charleston, South Carolina; 1821–1822	Succeeded by John Geddes
Preceded by Stephen Decatur Miller	Governor of South Carolina; 1830–1832	Succeeded by Robert Y. Hayne
