= Jacob F. Mintzing =

Mayor of Charleston

33rd Mayor of Charleston
- In office 1840 – March 14, 1842
- Preceded by: Henry Laurens Pinckney
- Succeeded by: John Schnierle

Personal details
- Died: March 14, 1842
- Party: Democrat

Jacob F. Mintzing was the thirty-third mayor of Charleston, South Carolina, serving from 1840 until his death in office on March 14, 1842, from stomach cancer.

Mintzing was reelected as mayor of Charleston on September 6, 1841.

Preceded by Henry Laurens Pinckney	Mayor of Charleston, South Carolina; 1840–1842	Succeeded by John Schnierle
