= Joseph Johnson (South Carolina mayor) =

American physician, mayor of Charleston

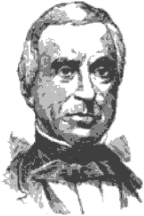

27th Mayor of Charleston
- In office 1825–1827
- Preceded by: Samuel Prioleau
- Succeeded by: John Gadsden

Personal details
- Born: June 15, 1776 Mount Pleasant, South Carolina
- Died: October 6, 1862 (aged 86) Pineville, South Carolina
- Party: Whig
- Spouse: Catherine Hannah Bonneau
- Profession: Physician

Joseph Johnson (1776–1862) was the twenty-seventh mayor of Charleston, South Carolina, serving two terms from 1825 to 1827. He was re-elected to his second term on September 4, 1826. He also was the president of the Branch Bank of the United States from 1818 until its close and authored a work titled "Traditions of South Carolina." Johnson died on October 6, 1862, in Pineville, South Carolina. In his youth he operated the leading drug store in Charleston.

Preceded by Samuel Prioleau	Mayor of Charleston, South Carolina; 1825–1827	Succeeded by John Gadsden
