= Elias Horry =

American politician

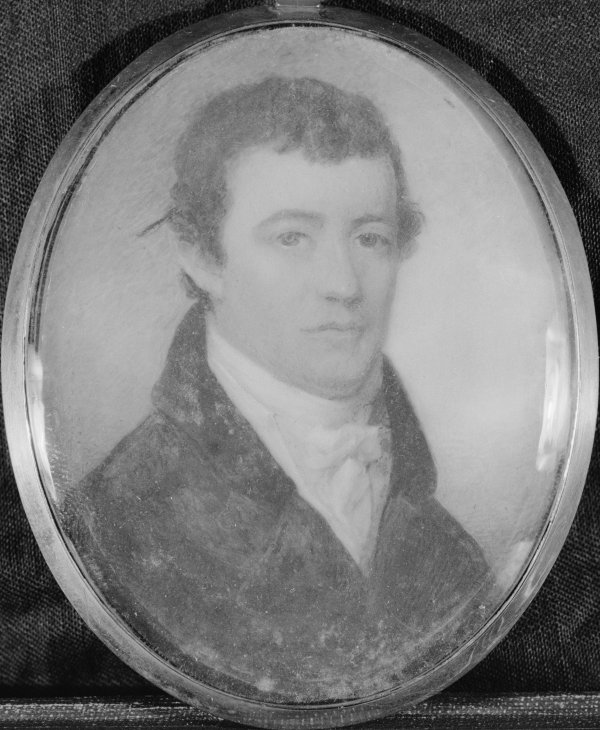

22nd Mayor of Charleston
- In office 1815–1817
- Preceded by: Thomas Rhett Smith
- Succeeded by: John Geddes
- In office 1820–1821
- Preceded by: Daniel Stevens
- Succeeded by: James Hamilton Jr.

Member of the South Carolina House of Representatives from St. James, Santee Parish
- In office 1794 – 1804

Member of the South Carolina House of Representatives from Charleston
- In office 1830 – 1833

President of the South Carolina Canal and Railroad Company
- In office 1831-1843
- Succeeded by: Railroad merged

Personal details
- Born: June 21, 1773 Charleston, South Carolina
- Died: September 17, 1834 (aged 61) Charleston, South Carolina
- Spouse(s): Harriet Vanderhorst (m. 1797) Mary R. Shubrick (m. 1817)
- Children: 7
- Profession: Lawyer, planter, businessman

Elias Horry (1773 – September 17, 1834) was a lawyer, politician, businessman and plantation owner who twice served in the South Carolina General Assembly as well as the intendant (mayor) of Charleston, South Carolina, serving two terms from 1815 to 1817 and 1820 to 1821.

== Early and family life ==
Horry was born in 1773 and received a private education suitable for his class. He joined Charles Cotesworth Pinckney's office as a law student.

He married twice. In 1797 he married Harriet Vanderhorst, who bore three sons and two daughters before her death: Thomas Lynch Horry (1806–1871); Harriet Vanderhorst Horry Frost (1807–1890); Ann Branford Horry (1812–1824) and Elias Horry (1815–1817). The widower then married Mary R. Shubrick in 1817, who bore Alicia Mary Horry (1820–1826); Elias Horry (1822–1839); and Richard Shubrick Horry (1823–1824).

== Career ==
In 1793, Horry was admitted to the South Carolina bar. He represented St. James, Santee, in the South Carolina General Assembly from 1794 to 1804.

Horry was elected warden (city council member) in September 1813 before becoming the interim intendant (mayor) on March 30, 1815, after Thomas Rhett Smith resigned. On September 18, 1815, he was elected to a full term and then re-elected September 16, 1816, defeating Daniel Stevens. After four terms by two other mayors, Horry returned to the position, after having been elected on September 4, 1820, for one more term.

Many years later, he again served in the South Carolina House of Representatives, representing the Charleston area from 1830 to 1833.

Horry owned several plantations which he operated using enslaved labor, including: The Bluff, Wattahan, Milldam, Jutland, Camp Main, Camp Island, Newland, Midland and Millbrook plantations (Santee River) in Georgetown District and St. James, Santee, Parish.

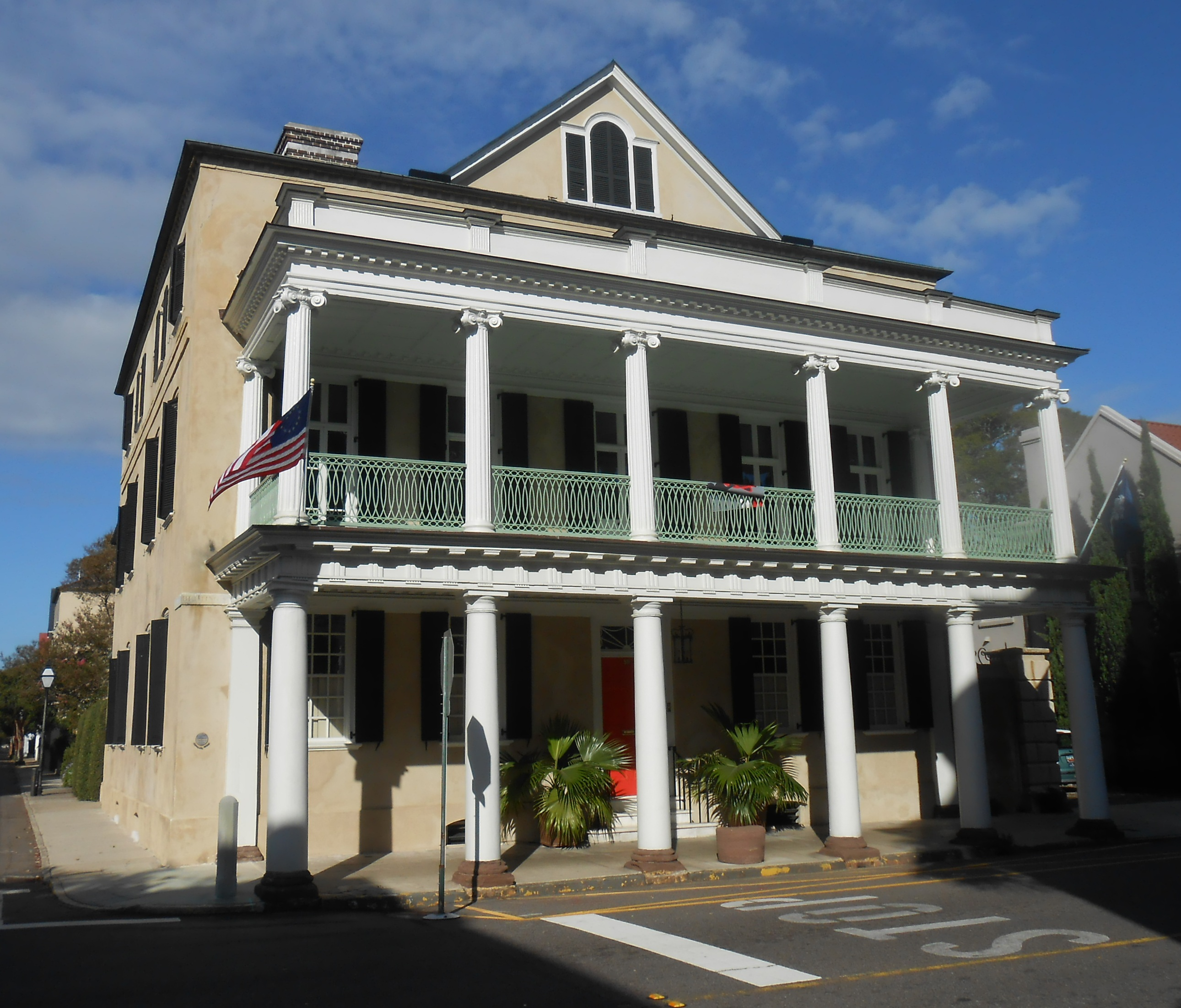
Elias Horry inherited the Branford-Horry House at 59 Meeting St., Charleston, South Carolina from his father, Thomas Horry, and added the front portico.

Horry became president of the South Carolina Canal and Railroad Company in 1831.

== Death and legacy ==
Horry died on September 17, 1834. He is buried at the Cathedral of St. Luke and St. Paul in Charleston, South Carolina. The Branford-Horry House in which he was raised and later lived in Charleston was placed on the National Register of Historic Places in 1970, and remains in private ownership.

Preceded by Thomas Rhett Smith	Mayor of Charleston, South Carolina; 1815–1817	Succeeded by John Geddes
Preceded by Daniel Stevens	Mayor of Charleston, South Carolina; 1820–1821	Succeeded by James Hamilton Jr.
