= Benjamin Boyd (mayor) =

American politician

17th Mayor of Charleston
- In office 1808–1808
- Preceded by: John Dawson Jr.
- Succeeded by: William Rouse

Benjamin Boyd was the seventeenth intendent (mayor) of Charleston, South Carolina, serving one term in 1808. He was elected on July 22, 1808, to complete the term of John Dawson Jr., who had resigned. Boyd was the shortest serving mayor of Charleston; a regular election was held on September 12, 1808, at which his successor, William Rouse, was elected.

| Preceded by John Dawson Jr. | Mayor of Charleston, South Carolina; 1808 | Succeeded by William Rouse |
