= Thomas Leger Hutchinson =

American politician

35th Mayor of Charleston
- In office 1846–1850
- Preceded by: John Schnierle
- Succeeded by: John Schnierle
- In office 1852–1855
- Preceded by: John Schnierle
- Succeeded by: William Porcher Miles

Personal details
- Born: February 17, 1812
- Died: August 18, 1883 (aged 71)
- Spouse(s): Lydia Julia Macauley (m. 1833); Catherine (Douglas) Hussey (m. 1869)
- Education: Harvard Law School (1832)
- Profession: Lawyer, rice planter

Thomas Leger Hutchinson (1812–1883) was an American lawyer, rice planter, and politician who served as the 35th intendant (mayor) of Charleston, South Carolina. He served twice, defeating John Schnierle in 1846, being defeated by John Schnierle in 1850, and then beating John Schnierle again in 1852.

Hutchinson was first elected intendant on September 7, 1846, succeeding John Schnierle. Hutchinson won successive terms on September 6, 1847; September 4, 1848; and September 3, 1849. In September 1850, however, he lost to John Schnierle. After two years out of the mayorship, Hutchinson was again elected on September 1, 1852, and won a final term the next year on November 2, 1853. He represented the Charleston area (St. Philip's and St. Michael's parishes) in the South Carolina General Assembly in the 1862–1863 session.

Hutchinson was born on February 17, 1812. He attended Harvard Law School starting in April 1830 and left in 1832. He died on August 18, 1883, and is buried in the Huguenot Church cemetery.

Preceded by John Schnierle	Mayor of Charleston, South Carolina; 1846–1850	Succeeded by John Schnierle
Preceded by John Schnierle	Mayor of Charleston, South Carolina; 1852–1855	Succeeded by William Porcher Miles
