= Henry Whilden Lockwood =

American politician

55th Mayor of Charleston
- In office 1938 – June 5, 1944
- Preceded by: Burnet R. Maybank
- Succeeded by: E. Edward Wehman, Jr.

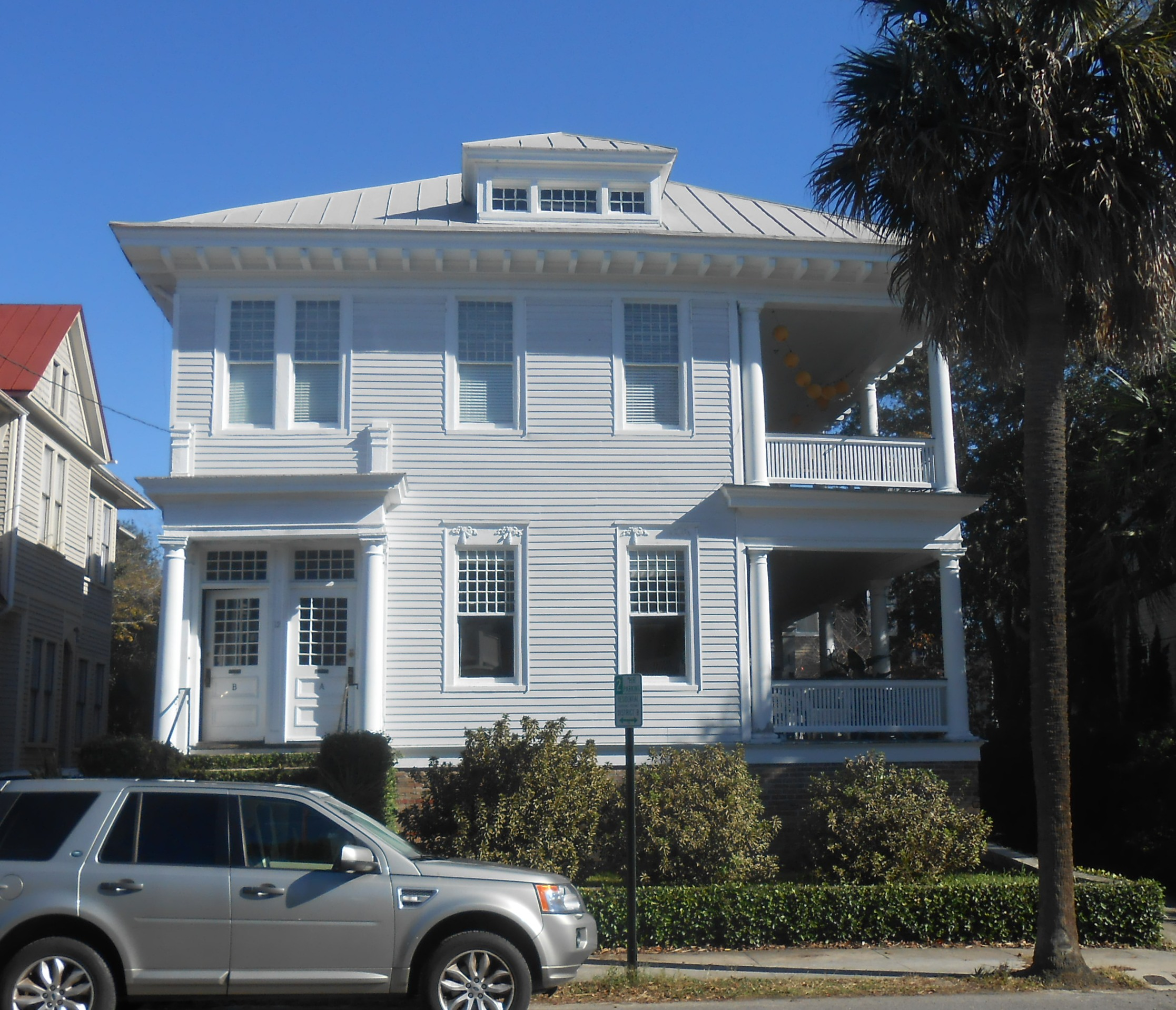
Mayor Lockwood lived at 12-B Rutledge Ave. during his time in office.

Henry Whilden Lockwood was the fifty-fifth mayor of Charleston, South Carolina, serving between 1938 and 1944.

After completing the term of his predecessor, Lockwood was elected without opposition on December 12, 1939. He was sworn in on December 18, 1939. As mayor, he lobbied his predecessor to continue funding for the construction of a municipal incinerator. Federal authorities continued to delay the construction, however. Lockwood initially supported the demolition of a historic wall at the old Charleston jail until several leaders, including Governor Maybank, expressed support for preserving the structure.

Lockwood was born on August 24, 1891, to Robert Henry Lockwood and Ella Ann Whilden Lockwood. Lockwood died in office on June 5, 1944.

Lockwood lived in a second floor apartment at 12-B Rutledge Ave.

Political offices
Preceded by Burnet R. Maybank	Mayor of Charleston, South Carolina; 1938–1944	Succeeded by E. Edward Wehman Jr.
