= Gov. Thomas Bennett House =

Historic house in South Carolina, United States

- U.S. National Register of Historic Places
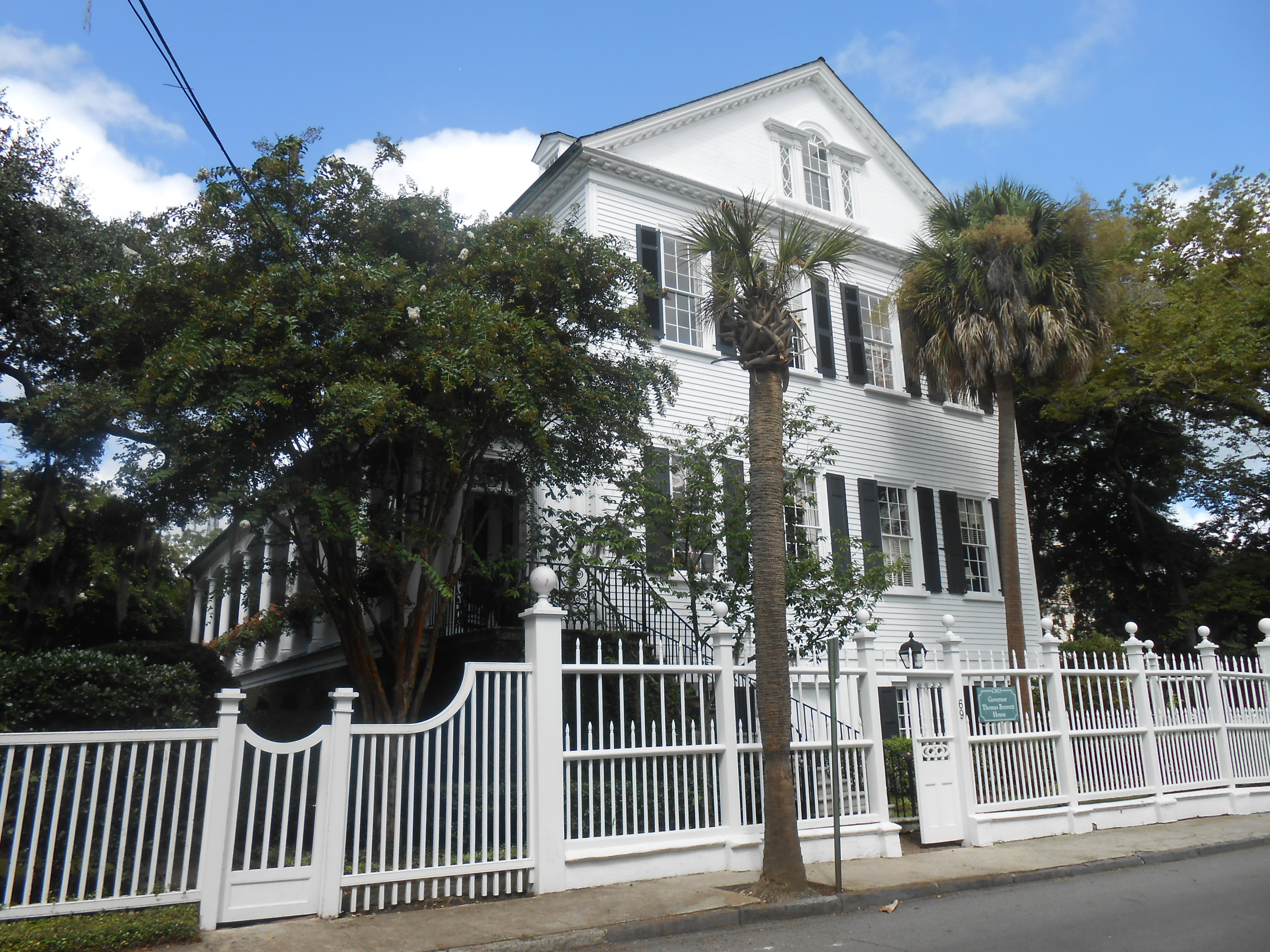

- Location within South Carolina Location within the United States
- Location: 69 Barre St., Charleston, South Carolina
- Coordinates: 32°46′53″N 79°56′50″W
- Area: 1 acre (0.40 ha)
- Built: 1825
- NRHP reference No.: 78002496
- Added to NRHP: January 31, 1978

The Gov. Thomas Bennett House is a National Register property located at 69 Barre St. in Charleston, South Carolina. It was built in approximately 1825 on land which had once belonged to architect and builder Thomas Bennett, Sr. (1754-1814). It was named to the National Register of Historic Places in 1978.

== History ==
Thomas Bennett, Sr.'s son, Thomas Bennett, Jr. (1781-1865), took over his father's lumber and milling business but was also active in state and local politics. He was superintendent of Charleston, South Carolina; a member of the South Carolina House of Representatives (and was its speaker from 1814 to 1818); a member of the South Carolina Senate; and governor of the state. After his term as governor, Thomas Bennett, Jr. undertook the construction of this notable house on land which originally overlooked the rice and saw mills which he owned.

== Architecture ==
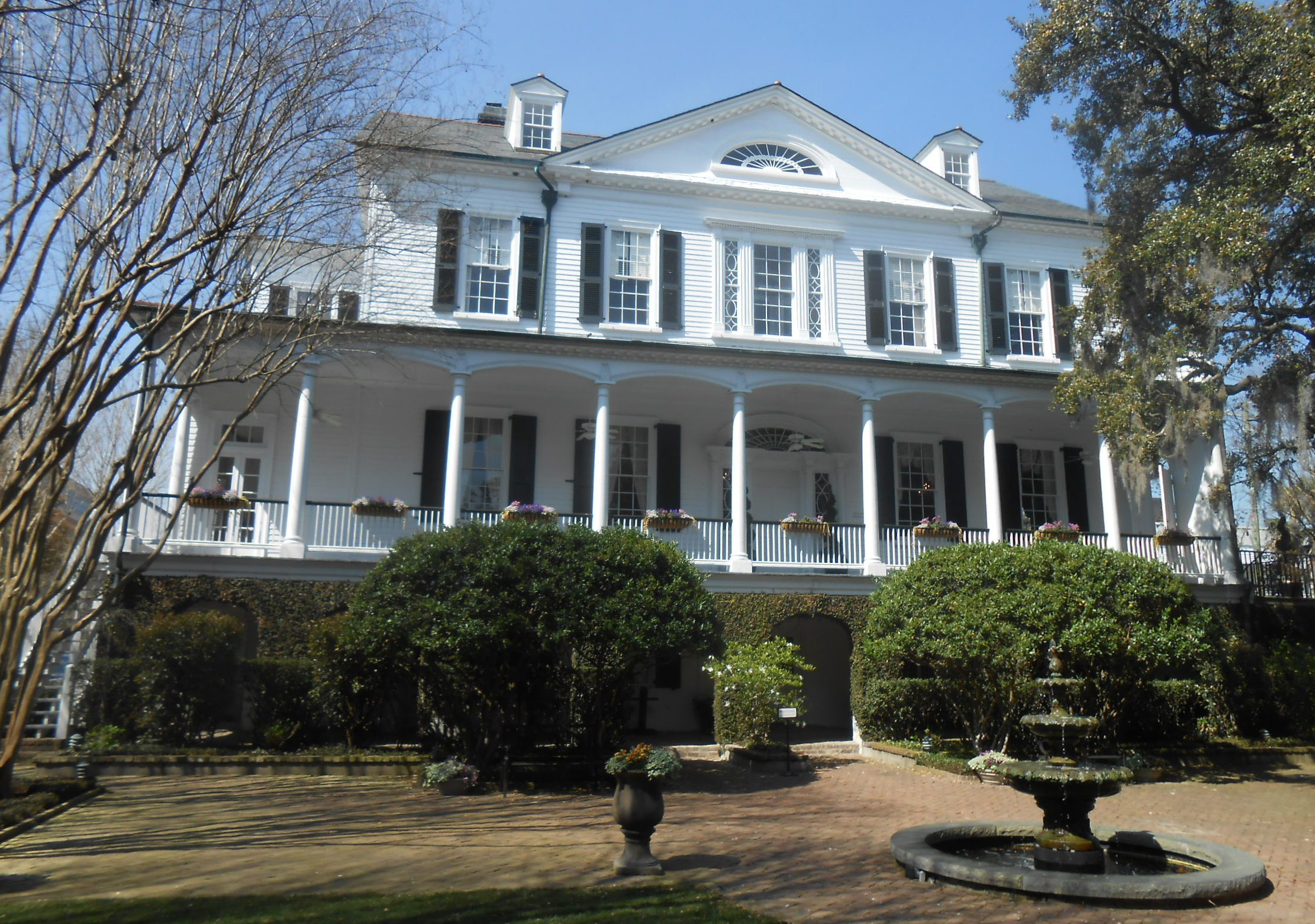
The woodwork around the main entrance and along the piazzas on the south side are notable.

The interior is notable for its Regency details. There is a cantilevered stair; the only other cantilevered staircase in Charleston is at the Nathaniel Russell House at 51 Meeting St. The house's floorplan is a basic double house.

== Sources ==
Robert Stockton, Information for Guides of Historic Charleston, South Carolina 98-99 (1985).
