= Thomas Rhett Smith =

American Politician

21st Mayor of Charleston
- In office 1813 – March 1815
- Preceded by: Thomas Bennett Jr.
- Succeeded by: Elias Horry

Personal details
- Born: 1768
- Died: March 28, 1829 (aged 60–61)
- Party: Federalist
- Spouse: Anne Rebecca Skirving (m. 1795)
- Children: Anne Hutchinson Smith Elliott
- Education: Cambridge University

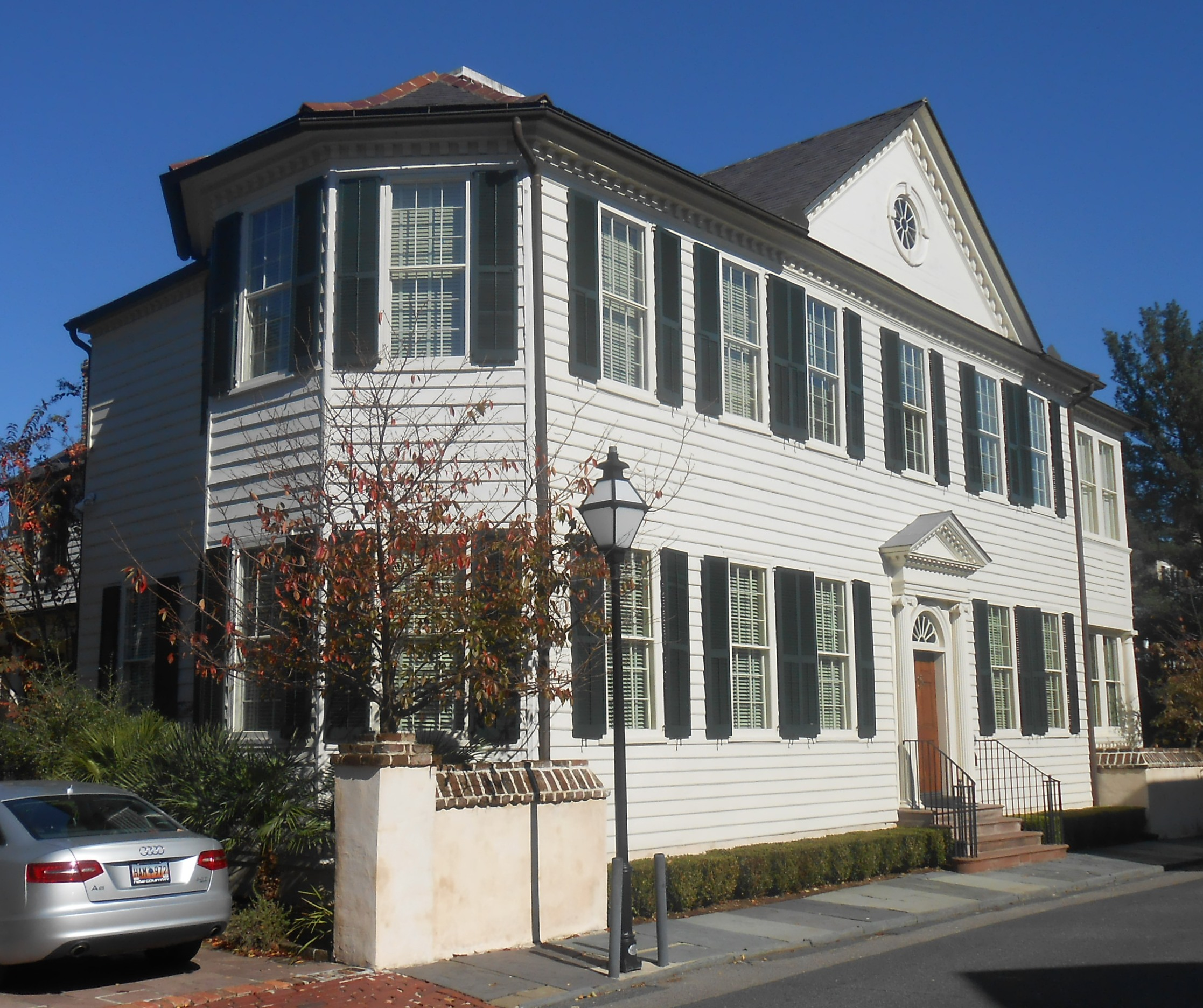
Thomas Rhett Smith acquired the John Drayton House at 2 Ladson St., Charleston in 1813 and occupied it during his time as mayor of the city.

Thomas Rhett Smith was the twenty-first intendant (mayor) of Charleston, South Carolina, serving from 1813 to March 1815.

Smith was born in 1768 to Roger Smith and Mary Rutledge. He served in the South Carolina House of Representatives for St. James and Goose Creek Parish during four session, 1792–1799. In September 1796, he was elected to be a warden (city council member) for Charleston and was re-elected in September 1797. In 1800–1801, he served another term, representing the Charleston area.

Smith was elected intendant on September 20, 1813, by a vote of 465 (Smith) to 318 (Democrat Thomas Bennett Jr.) and was re-elected on September 19, 1814. He did not complete his second term; he resigned in March 1815 and was replaced by Elias Horry.

Preceded by Thomas Bennett Jr.	Mayor of Charleston, South Carolina; 1813–1815	Succeeded by Elias Horry
