= William Rouse =

American politician

18th Mayor of Charleston
- In office 1808–1810
- Preceded by: Benjamin Boyd
- Succeeded by: Thomas H. McCalla

Personal details
- Spouse: Mary Martha Stuart
- Profession: Tanner and leather worker

William Rouse was the eighteenth intendant (mayor) of Charleston, South Carolina, serving two consecutive terms from 1808 to 1810.

Rouse was born in about 1756 in Yorkshire, England to Eli Rouse and Martha Asquith. After Revolutionary War service in Virginia, Georgia, and South Carolina, he settled in Charleston in 1783. He was commissioned as an officer in the state militia in 1794 and promoted to major on July 13, 1807, and then lieutenant colonel on July 4, 1808.

He was elected intendant on September 12, 1808, and re-elected September 21, 1809.

He died on June 15, 1829.

He represented St. Philip's and St. Michael's parishes (i.e., the Charleston area) in the South Carolina General Assembly five times (1806–1809 and 1820–1835) and also in the South Carolina Senate (1812–1815).

Preceded by Benjamin Boyd	Mayor of Charleston, South Carolina; 1808	Succeeded by Thomas H. McCalla
