= John Dawson Jr. =

American politician

16th Mayor of Charleston
- In office 1806–1808
- Preceded by: Charles Cochran
- Succeeded by: Benjamin Boyd

Personal details
- Born: July 8, 1765 Charleston, South Carolina, British America
- Died: June 3, 1823 (aged 57) Charleston, South Carolina, U.S.
- Spouse: Mary Shubrick Huger (m. 1789)
- Children: 3
- Profession: Merchant, planter

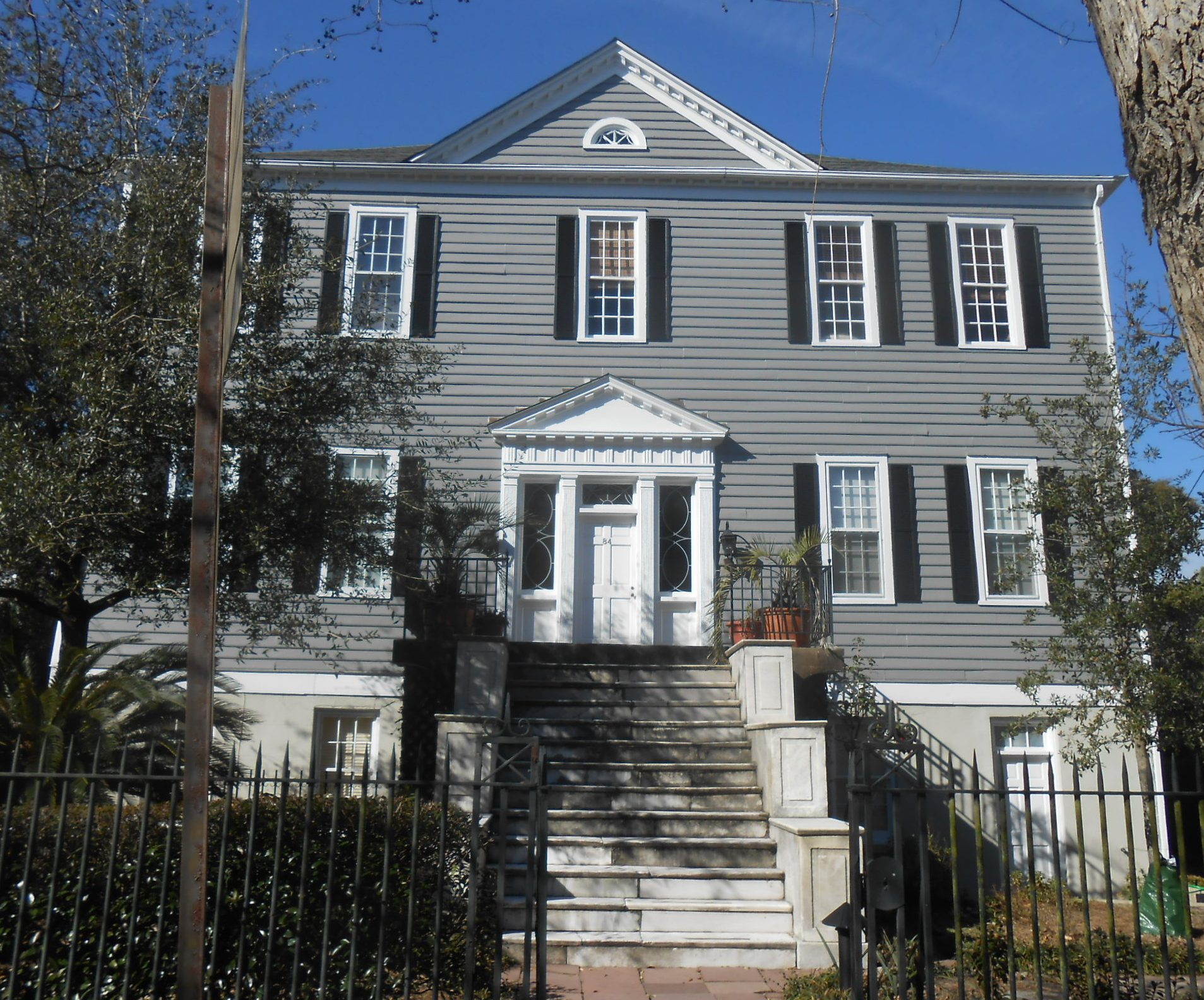
While serving as intendant of Charleston, Dawson lived at 84 Bull Street, Charleston, South Carolina.

John Dawson Jr. (July 8, 1765 – June 3, 1823) was the sixteenth intendant (mayor) of Charleston, South Carolina, serving two terms from 1806 to 1808.

== Early life ==
Dawson was born on July 8, 1765, to John Dawson and Joanna Broughton Monck.

== Career ==
He was elected intendant on September 15, 1806, and then re-elected September 14, 1807. He resigned and was replaced by Benjamin Boyd in July 1808. He simultaneously represented the Charleston area in the South Carolina House of Representatives from 1800 to 1808.

== Personal life ==
In 1789, he married Mary Shubrick Huger, the daughter of Colonel John Huger, who served as the 6th mayor of Charleston. Huger was a member of the Commons House of Assembly and a member of the Council of Safety, the group that organized revolutionary movements in Charleston, and his estate, known as the Hagan Plantation, comprised almost 5,000 acres. Together, they were the parents of:

- Charlotte Motte Dawson (1789–1857)
- Mary Anne Dawson (1796–1860)
- Lawrence Edwin Dawson (1799–1848)

He died on June 3, 1823, and is buried at the Cathedral Church of St. Luke and St. Paul, Charleston, South Carolina.

| Preceded by Charles Cochran | Mayor of Charleston, South Carolina; 1806–1808 | Succeeded by Benjamin Boyd |
