= Thomas Winstanley (mayor) =

American politician

18th Mayor of Charleston
- In office 1804–1805
- Preceded by: John Drayton
- Succeeded by: Charles Cochran

Personal details
- Born: 1755
- Died: November 4, 1832 (aged 76–77)

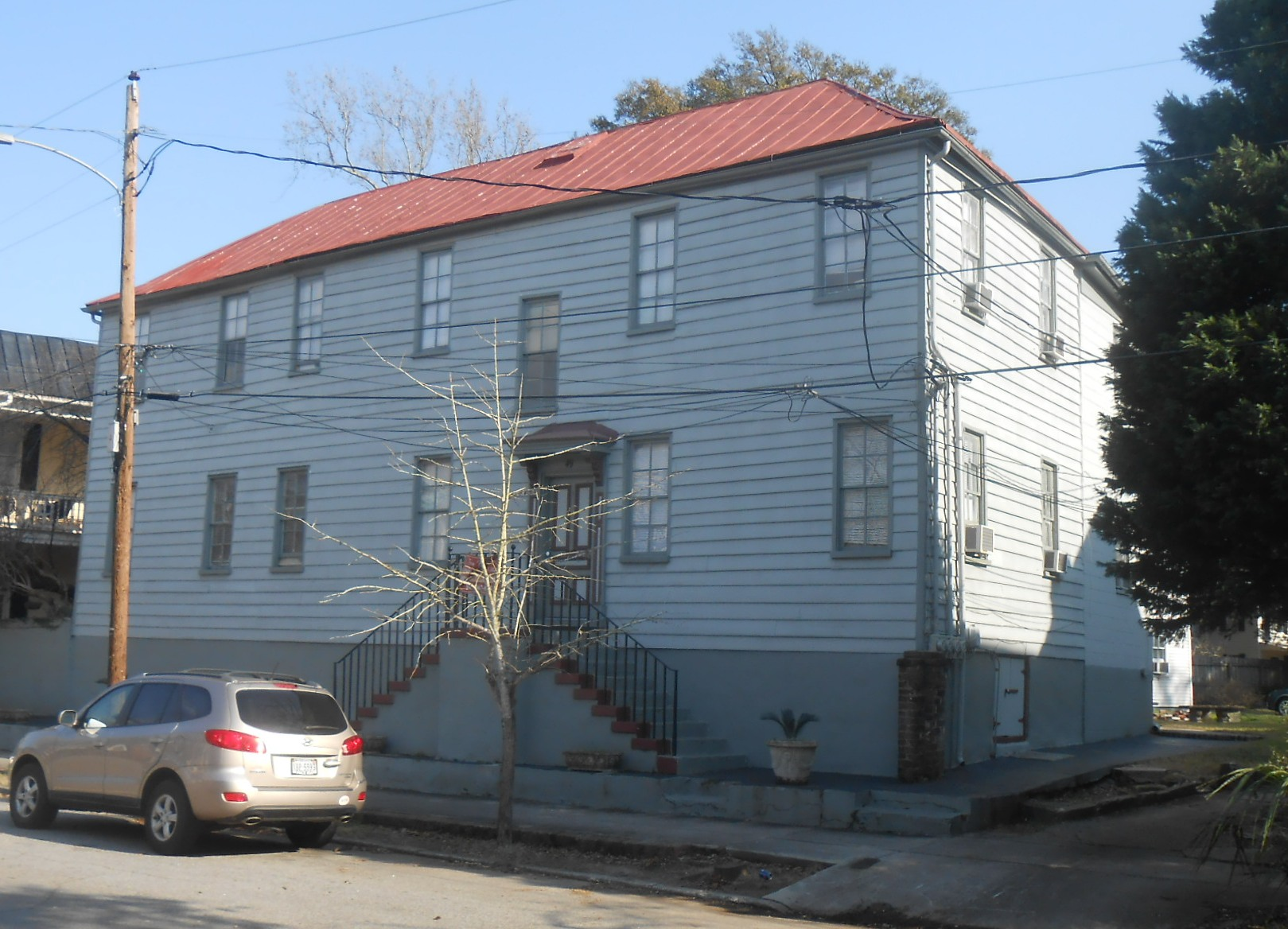
Thomas Winstanley lived at 49 Chapel St., Charleston, South Carolina while serving as intendant of the city.

Thomas Winstanley was the eighteenth intendant (mayor) of Charleston, South Carolina, serving one term between 1804 and 1805. He had been elected as a warden (city council member) for Charleston on September 23, 1801. On October 5, 1803, he was elected intendant pro tem during the absence of the intendant.

Winstanley died on November 4, 1832.

Preceded by John Drayton	Mayor of Charleston, South Carolina; 1804–1805	Succeeded by Charles Cochran
