= Charles Macbeth =

American politician

37th Mayor of Charleston
- In office 1857–1865
- Preceded by: William Porcher Miles
- Succeeded by: Peter Charles Gaillard

Personal details
- Born: January 24, 1805 Charleston, South Carolina
- Died: November 30, 1881 (aged 76) Pinopolis, South Carolina
- Profession: Lawyer

Charles Macbeth (1805-1881) was the thirty-seventh mayor of Charleston, South Carolina, serving three full terms and a partial term between 1857 and 1865. He was born on January 24, 1805, in Charleston, South Carolina, and he died on November 30, 1881, in Pinopolis, South Carolina. From 1830 to 1865, he was part of a Charleston law practice.

On February 17, 1865, Macbeth informed the Northern forces that the city had been evacuated, but he remained to preserve order. When he learned of plans by Confederate loyalists to set fires across the newly occupied city, he joined with an alderman and petitioned the Northern military for assistance. He then set up armed guards to protect important sites. In 1881, the city's annual yearbook praised him for not just protecting his fellow Charlestonians from their enemies, but "even against themselves."

In 1935, the city paid $200 for a portrait of Mayor Macbeth. The painting, already in bad shape, suffered further damage from Hurricane Hugo. The portrait is the only known image of Macbeth.

He is buried at First Scots Presbyterian Church in Charleston, South Carolina.

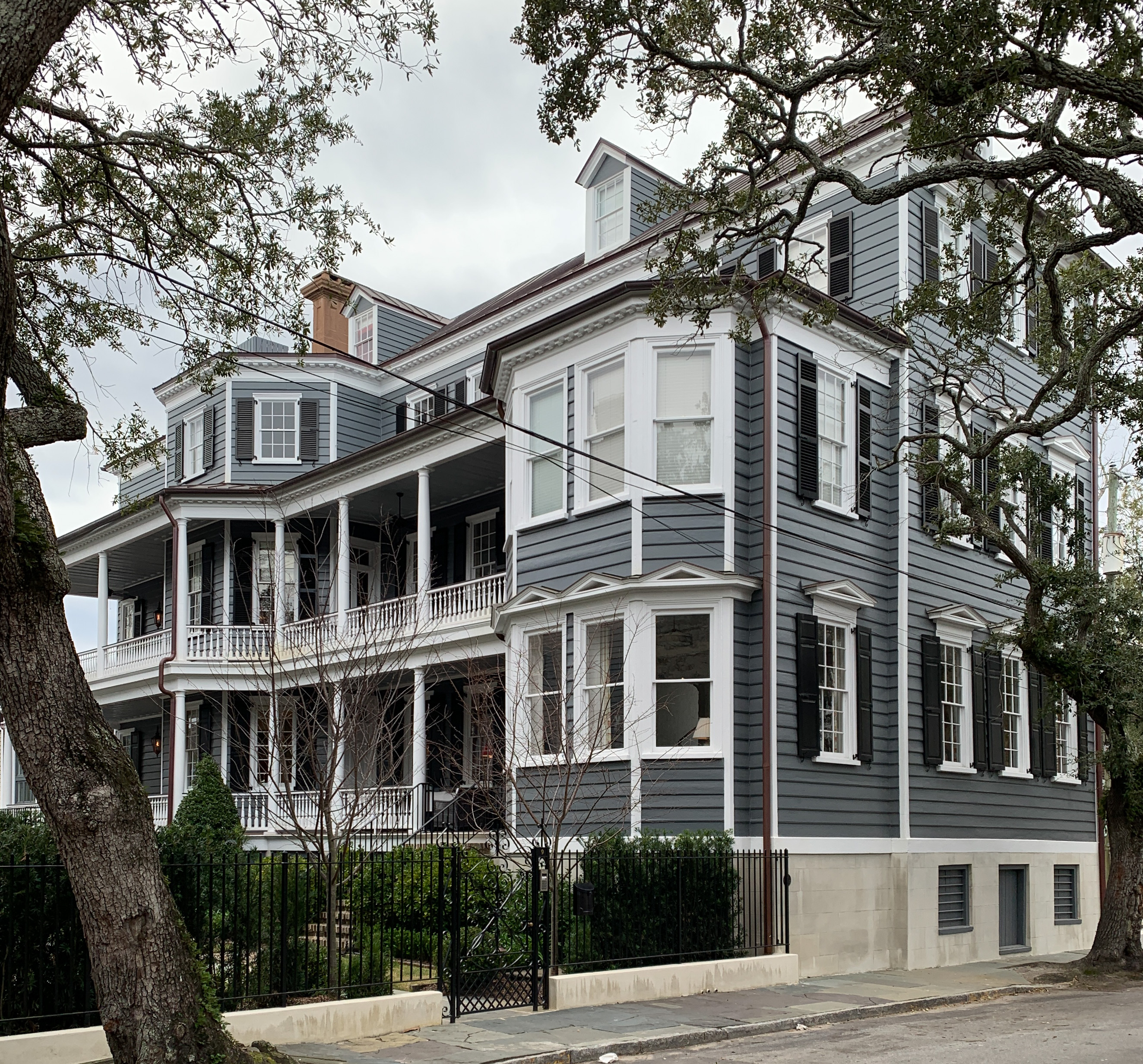
During his tenure as mayor of Charleston, Macbeth lived at 9 Legare Street in a house which has since been known as the Charles Macbeth House

Preceded by William Porcher Miles	Mayor of Charleston, South Carolina; 1857–1865	Succeeded by Peter Charles Gaillard
