= Peter Charles Gaillard =

American politician (1812–1889)

38th Mayor of Charleston
- In office 1865–1868
- Preceded by: Charles Macbeth
- Succeeded by: William Wallace Burns

Personal details
- Born: December 29, 1812 Walnut Grove Plantation, Berkeley County, South Carolina, US
- Died: January 11, 1889 (aged 76)
- Spouse: Anne Lawrence Snowden Gaillard
- Education: South Carolina College (1832); United States Military Academy (West Point) (1835)

Military service
- Allegiance: United States; Confederate States of America
- Branch/service: US Army; Confederate States Army
- Years of service: 1835–1838 (USA); 1861–1865 (CSA)
- Rank: 2nd Lieutenant (USA); Colonel (SC Militia); Colonel (CSA)
- Unit: 1st U.S. Infantry
- Commands: 17th South Carolina Militia Regiment; 1st (Gaillard's) Battalion (CSA); 27th South Carolina Infantry Regiment (CSA)
- Battles/wars: 2nd Seminole War; American Civil War: Battle of Secessionville; Siege of Charleston Harbor; Battle of Cold Harbor; Bermuda Hundred Campaign; Petersburg Campaign; Battle of Weldon Railroad; Battle of Wilmington

Peter Charles Gaillard (1812–1889) was the thirty-eighth mayor of Charleston, South Carolina, serving from 1865 to 1868. He was the last mayor elected before the Civil War.

He died on January 11, 1889.

| Preceded by Charles Macbeth | Mayor of Charleston, South Carolina; 1865–1868 | Succeeded by William Wallace Burns |
