= David Deas (mayor) =

American politician

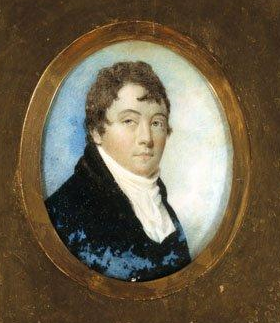

12th Mayor of Charleston
- In office 1802–1803
- Preceded by: John Ward
- Succeeded by: John Drayton

Personal details
- Born: 1771
- Died: 1822 (aged 50–51) Charleston, South Carolina, U.S.
- Spouse: Mary Sommers

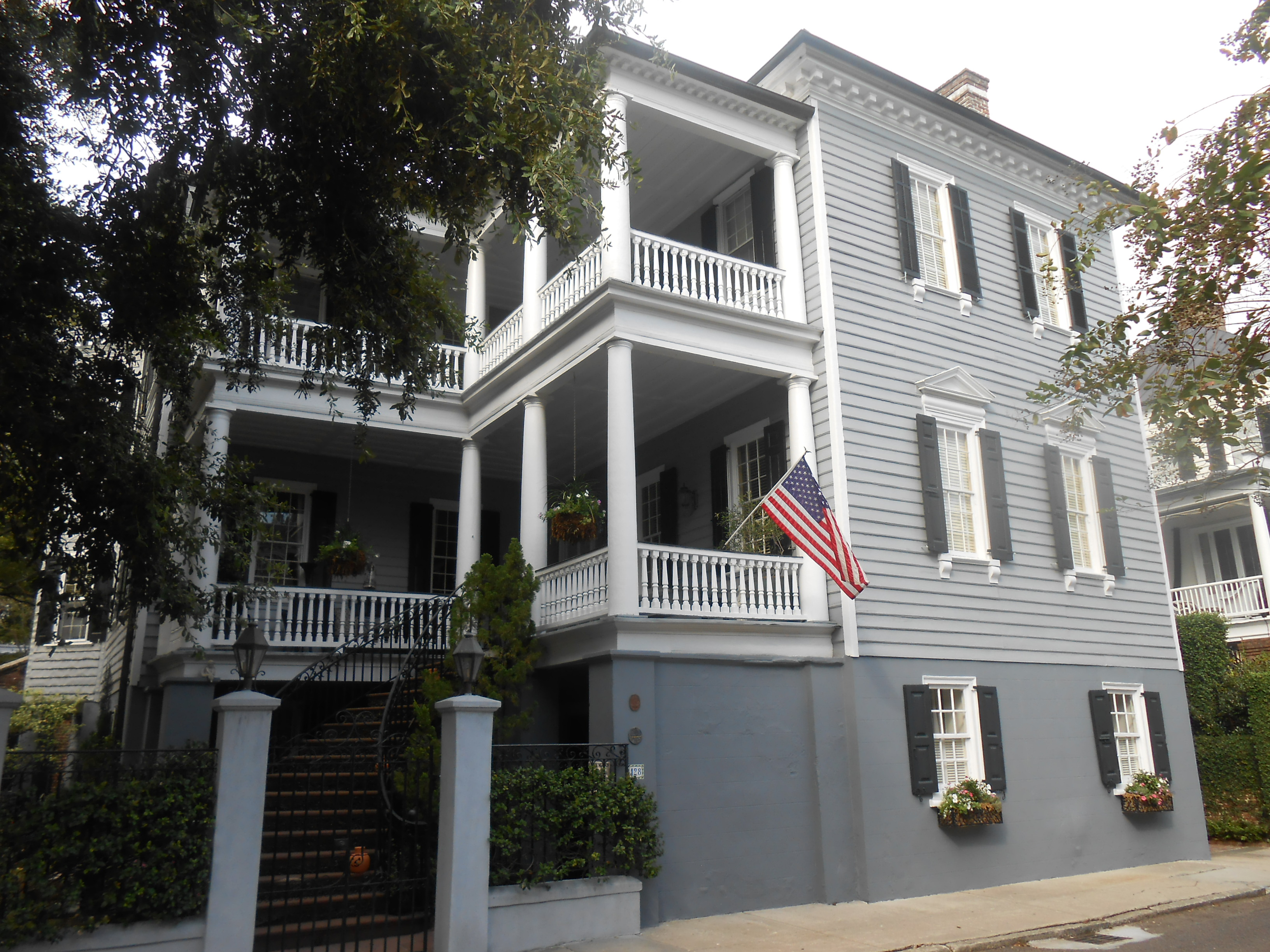
The Humphry Sommers House at 128 Tradd St., Charleston, South Carolina was built by the father-in-law of David Deas in about 1772 and acquired by David Deas upon his marriage to Mary Sommers.

David Deas was the twelfth intendant of Charleston, South Carolina, serving from 1802 to 1803.

His father, David Deas, and uncle, John Deas were reportedly the third largest slave traders in the US. Both hailed from Leith, Scotland. John Deas sailed for the Providence of South Carolina on January 28, 1749, where he joined his elder brother, David.

He was elected on September 1, 1800, to a first term as a warden (city council member) for Charleston, South Carolina. He married Mary Sommers on October 16, 1800. He was elected intendant in September 1802. Deas implemented a quarantine of ships having been to New York City to prevent the spread of a contagious fever to Charleston in September and October 1803. In 1803 he began serving in the South Carolina House of Representatives where he, among other things, sought to repeal part of the Negro Act providing that slaves could be imported for free. His death in 1822 is recorded in the return of interments in the City of Charleston as suicide.

Preceded by John Ward	Mayor of Charleston, South Carolina; 1802–1803	Succeeded by John Drayton
