= Thomas H. McCalla =

Mayor of Charleston

19th Mayor of Charleston
- In office 1810–1812
- Preceded by: William Rouse
- Succeeded by: Thomas Bennett Jr.

Thomas H. McCalla was the nineteenth intendant (mayor) of Charleston, South Carolina, serving two consecutive terms from 1810 to 1812.

In addition to being a medical doctor, McCalla was an officer with the Vigilant Fire Insurance Company. McCalla declined to run for a position in the South Carolina State House in 1802.

He was elected on September 17, 1810, to be intendant of Charleston. He was re-elected in September 1811 for his second term.

Preceded by William Rouse	Mayor of Charleston, South Carolina; 1810–1812	Succeeded by Thomas Bennett Jr.
