= Samuel Prioleau =

American politician (1784–1839)

26th Mayor of Charleston
- In office 1824–1825
- Preceded by: John Geddes
- Succeeded by: Joseph Johnson

Personal details
- Born: 4 September 1784 Charleston, South Carolina
- Died: 6 May 1839 (aged 54) Pendleton, South Carolina
- Party: Federalist
- Profession: lawyer

Coat of Arms of Samuel Prioleau

Samuel Prioleau was the twenty-sixth mayor of Charleston, South Carolina, serving from 1824 to 1825.

The Prioleaus were a prominent South Carolina planter family of French Huguenot descent. In 1820, Prioleau was elected to serve as a representative in the South Carolina House of Representatives for Charleston. He was well suited for service on the Judiciary Committee given his legal training. In 1825, he was made Recorder of the City by the City Council of Charleston.

His son, Charles K. Prioleau, was a cotton merchant who became the primary financial agent for the Confederacy in England during the American Civil War.

Preceded by John Geddes	Mayor of Charleston, South Carolina; 1824–1825	Succeeded by Joseph Johnson
