= William McG. Morrison =

American politician

57th Mayor of Charleston
- In office 1947–1959
- Preceded by: E. Edward Wehman Jr.
- Succeeded by: J. Palmer Gaillard Jr.

Personal details
- Born: January 8, 1903
- Died: January 1, 1960 (aged 56)

William McG. Morrison (January 8, 1903 – January 1, 1960) was the fifty-seventh mayor of Charleston, South Carolina, serving between two terms between 1947 and 1959. He was the first person elected to three terms as mayor of Charleston as a result of his win in June 1955. He lost his fourth bid by 455 votes to J. Palmer Gaillard, Jr. on June 9, 1959.

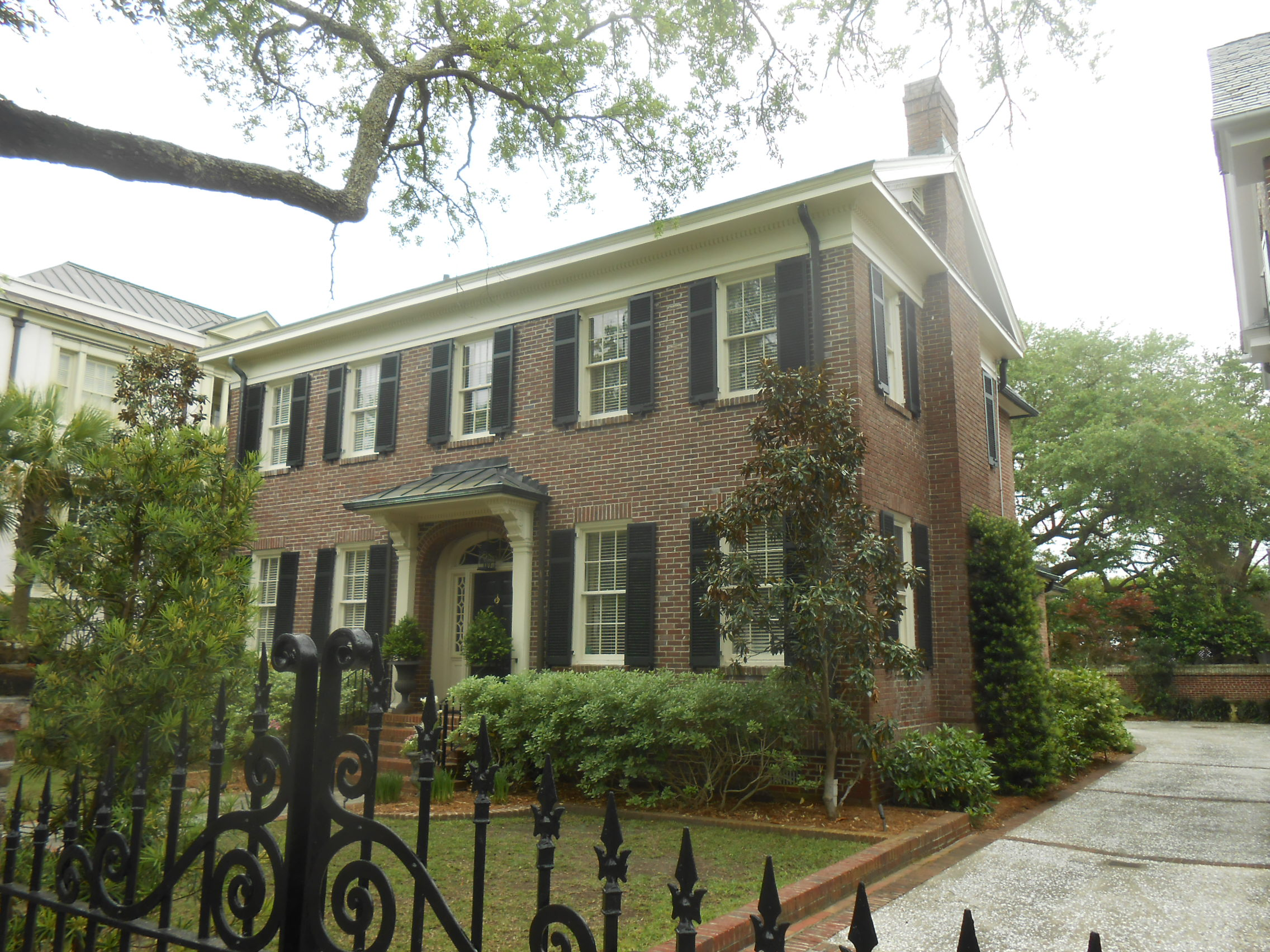
After attending a council meeting in August 1959, Morrison was too sick to appear at City Hall and worked from his house at 103 South Battery.

In his first term, Morrison originated the idea of closing the historic Charleston Orphan House and creating a new orphanage in the nearby suburbs around a series of cottages. During his final term in office, Morrison proposed changing the form of government to a manager system. He also proposed constructing a 700 foot long park along the Ashley River at the foot of Bee Street (in the footprint of what is now the southern Ashley River Bridge). Morrison favored creating a new city by merging Charleston with its neighboring city, North Charleston.

Morrison was born on January 8, 1903. In October 1957, Morrison was diagnosed with throat cancer and underwent extensive radiation treatment which left him weakened. He attended his final city council meeting in August 1959 before becoming too ill with kidney problems and side effects of his radiation treatment. He thereafter carried out city business from his home at 103 South Battery. He died on January 1, 1960.

Political offices
Preceded by E. Edward Wehman Jr.	Mayor of Charleston, South Carolina; 1947–1959	Succeeded by J. Palmer Gaillard Jr.
