= John Schnierle House =

Coordinates: 32.782281°N 79.939959°W

The John Schnierle House is an antebellum house in Charleston, South Carolina that was the home of Mayor John Schnierle.

John Michael Schnierle, a carpenter, bought the property upon which 31 Pitt Street was built on January 9, 1817. It appears that the house was built as a rental property, as the Schnierle family continued to live at their Legare Street (then Friend Street) house until John Michael Schnierle died in 1844. His estate papers listed the house as one of his properties. When the estate was closed, the house at 31 Pitt Street was included in the portion received by his son, also named John Schnierle. The younger John Schnierle served as the mayor of Charleston from 1842 to 1845 and then again in 1851 and 1852.

The house is a typical Charleston single house with Greek Revival details. The house was restored following its purchase by Wilson Ford Fullbright in 1971.
