= Webster–Hayne debate =

1830 debate between US senators Daniel Webster and Robert Hayne

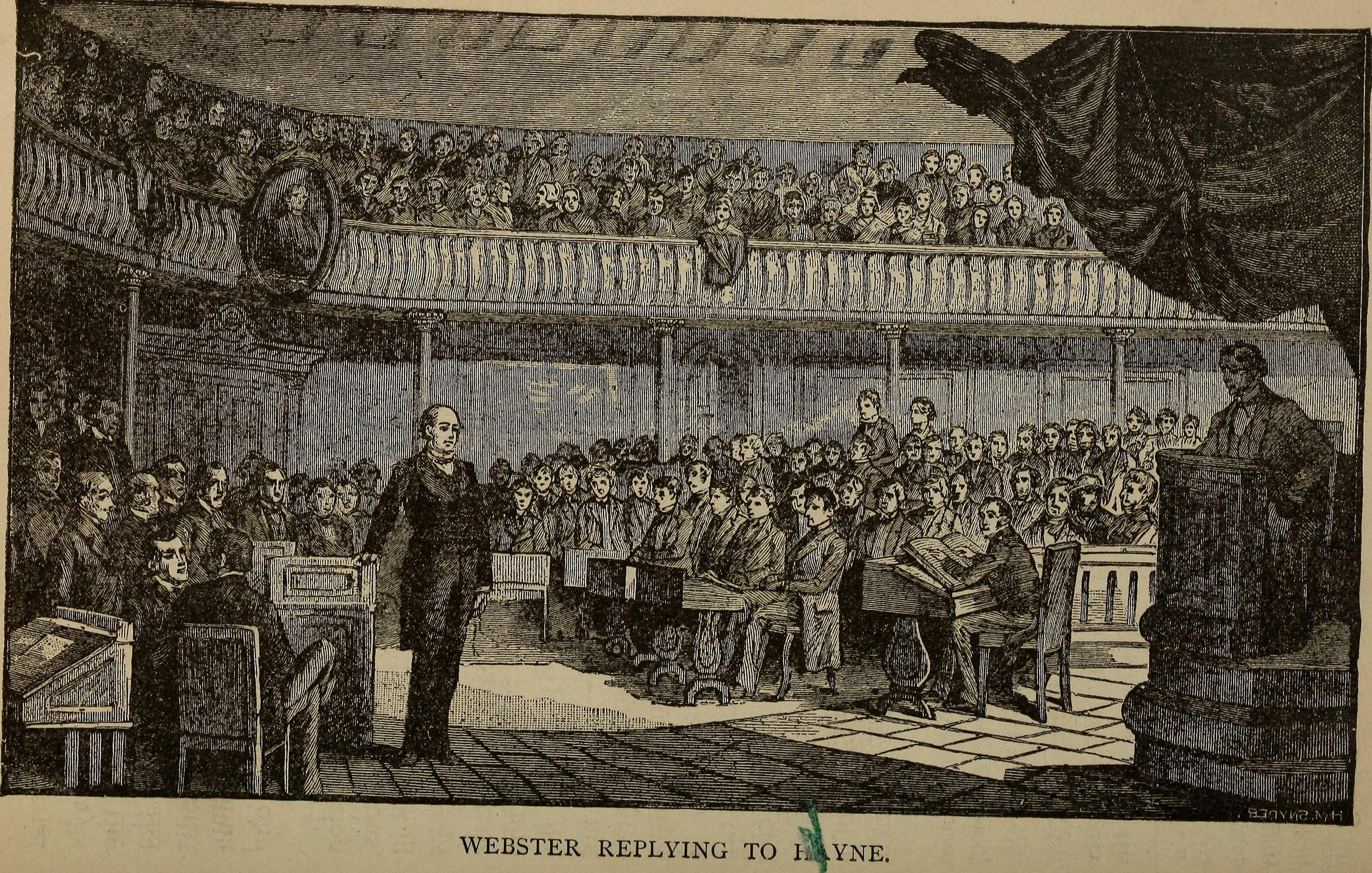
Webster replying to Hayne

The Webster–Hayne debate was a debate in the United States between Senator Daniel Webster of Massachusetts and Senator Robert Y. Hayne of South Carolina that took place on January 19–27, 1830 on the topic of protectionist tariffs. The heated speeches were unplanned and stemmed from the debate over a resolution by Connecticut Senator Samuel A. Foot calling for the temporary suspension of further land surveying until land already on the market was sold (to effectively stop the introduction of new lands onto the market). Webster's "Second Reply to Hayne" was generally regarded as "the most eloquent speech ever delivered in Congress."

Webster's description of the U.S. government as "made for the people, made by the people, and answerable to the people," was later paraphrased by Abraham Lincoln in the Gettysburg Address in the words "government of the people, by the people, for the people." The speech is also known for the line "Liberty and union, now and forever, one and inseparable", which would subsequently become the state motto of North Dakota, appearing on its state seal.

== Analysis ==
The 1830 Webster–Hayne debate centered around the South Carolina nullification crisis of the late 1820s. Massachusetts Senator Daniel Webster's "Second Reply" to South Carolina Senator Robert Y. Hayne was received as a great oratorical celebration of American nationalism and unity, particularly its argument that the American federal government was responsible to the American people, rather than to state legislatures. However, the speech also supported the sectional interests of Republican politicians in the Northeast—the tariffs at the core of the nullification crisis were intended to protect domestic industrial production—while eliding New England's own history of defying federal lawmakers. Webster's peers in Massachusetts responded warmly to the speech's defense of New England in both private correspondence and public resolutions, collaborating with printers, newspapers, and fellow politicians to ensure that Webster's preferred version of the remarks was widely published in the wake of the debate.

=== Schouler's analysis ===
South Carolina nullification was now coming in sight, and a celebrated debate that belongs to the first session exposed its claims and its fallacies to the country. The arena selected for a first impression was the Senate, where the arch-heretic himself presided and guided the onset with his eye. Hayne, South Carolina's foremost Senator, was the chosen champion; and the cause of his State, both in its right and wrong sides, could have found no abler exponent while [Vice President] Calhoun's official station kept him from the floor. It has been said that Hayne was Calhoun's sword and buckler and that he returned to the contest refreshed each morning by nightly communions with the Vice-President, drawing auxiliary supplies from the well-stored arsenal of his powerful and subtle mind. Be this as it may, Hayne was a ready and copious orator, a highly-educated lawyer, a man of varied accomplishments, shining as a writer, speaker, and counselor, equally qualified to draw up a bill or to advocate it, quick to memories, well fortified by wealth and marriage connections, dignified, never vulgar nor unmindful of the feelings of those with whom he mingled, Hayne moved in an atmosphere where lofty and chivalrous honor was the ruling sentiment. But it was the honor of a caste; and the struggling bread-winners of society, the great commonalty, he little studied or understood. This was the man to fire an aristocracy of fellow citizens ready to arm when their interests were in danger, and upon him, it devolved to advance the cause of South Carolina, break down the tariff, and fascinate the Union with the new rattlesnake theories.

The great debate, which culminated in Hayne's encounter with Webster, came about in a somewhat casual way. Senator Foote, of Connecticut, submitted a proposition inquiring into the expediency of limiting the sales of public lands to those already in the market. This seemed like an Eastern spasm of jealousy at the progress of the West. Benton was rising in renown as the advocate not only of Western settlers but of a new theory that the public lands should be given away instead of sold to them. He joined Hayne in using this opportunity to try to detach the West from the East, and restore the old cooperation of the West and the South against New England. The discussion took a wide range, going back to topics that had agitated the country before the Constitution was formed. It was of a partizan and censorious character and drew nearly all the chief senators out. But the topic which became the leading feature of the whole debate and gave it an undying interest was that of nullification, in which Hayne and Webster came forth as chief antagonists. . . .

Hayne launched his confident javelin at the New England States. He accused them of a desire to check the growth of the West in the interests of protection. Webster replied to his speech the next day and left not a shred of the charge, baseless as it was. Inflamed and mortified at this repulse, Hayne soon returned to the assault, primed with a two-day speech, which at great length vaunted the patriotism of South Carolina and bitterly attacked New England, dwelling particularly upon her conduct during the late war. It was a speech delivered before a crowded auditory, and loud were the Southern exultations that he was more than a match for Webster. Strange was it, however, that in heaping reproaches upon the Hartford Convention he did not mark how nearly its leaders had mapped out the same line of opposition to the national Government that his State now proposed to take, both relying upon the arguments of the Virginia and Kentucky resolutions of 1798–99.

Webster rose the next day in his seat to make his reply. He had allowed himself but a single night from eve to morn to prepare for a critical and crowning occasion. But his reply was gathered from the choicest arguments and the most decadent thoughts that had long floated through his brain while this crisis was gathering; and bringing these materials together in a lucid and compact shape, he calmly composed and delivered before another crowded and breathless auditory a speech full of burning passages, which will live as long as the American Union, and the grandest effort of his life. Two leading ideas predominated in this reply, and with respect to either Hayne was not only answered but put to silence. First, New England was vindicated. As a pious son of Federalism, Webster went the full length of the required defense.

Some of his historical deductions may be questioned; but far above all possible error on the part of her leaders, stood colonial and Revolutionary New England, and the sturdy, intelligent, and thriving people whose loyalty to the Union had never failed, and whose home, should ill befall the nation, would yet prove liberty's last shelter. Next, the Union was held up to view in all its strength, symmetry, and integrity, reposing in the ark of the Constitution, no longer an experiment, as in the days when Hamilton and Jefferson contended for shaping its course, but ordained and established by and for the people, to secure the blessings of liberty to all posterity. It was not a Union to be torn up without bloodshed; for nerves and arteries were interwoven with its roots and tendrils, sustaining the lives and interests of twelve million inhabitants. No hanging over the abyss of disunion, no weighing of the chances, no doubting as to what the Constitution was worth, no placing of liberty before Union, but "liberty and union, now and forever, one and inseparable." This was the tenor of Webster's speech, and nobly did the country respond to it. . . .

Some of Webster's personal friends had felt nervous over what appeared to them too hasty a period for preparation. But his calm, unperturbed manner reassured them in an instant. He entered the Senate on that memorable day with a slow and stately step and took his seat as though unconscious of the loud buzz of expectant interest with which the crowded auditory greeted his appearance. He was dressed with scrupulous care, in a blue coat with metal buttons, a buff vest rounding over his full abdomen, and his neck encircled with a white cravat. He rose, the image of conscious mastery, after the dull preliminary business of the day was dispatched, and with a happy figurative allusion to the tossed mariner, as he called for a reading of the resolution from which the debate had so far drifted, lifted his audience at once to his level. Then he began his speech, his words flowing on so completely at command that a fellow senator who heard him likened his elocution to the steady flow of molten gold. There was an end to all apprehension. Eloquence threw open the portals of eternal day. New England, the Union, and the Constitution in its integrity, all were triumphantly vindicated. The excited crowd which had packed the Senate chamber, filling every seat on the floor and in the galleries, and all the available standing room, dispersed after the orator's last grand apostrophe had died away in the air, with national pride throbbing at the heart.

Gloomy and downcast of late, Massachusetts men walked the avenue as though the fife and drum were before them. Hayne's few but zealous partizans shielded him still, and South Carolina spoke with pride of him. His speech was indeed a powerful one of its eloquence and personality. But his standpoint was purely local and sectional. The people read Webster's speech and marked him as the champion henceforth against all assaults upon the Constitution. An undefinable dread now went abroad that men were planning against the peace of the nation, that the Union was in danger; and citizens looked more closely after its safety and welfare. Webster's speech aroused the latent spirit of patriotism. Even Benton, whose connection with the debate made him at first belittle these grand utterances, soon felt the danger and repudiated the company of the nullifiers. He remained a Southern Unionist through his long public career and a good type of the growing class of statesman devoted to slave interests who loved the Union as it was and doted upon its compromises.

— from James Schouler, History of the United States. New York: Dodd, Mead & Company. (1891), copyright expired
