= John Ward (South Carolina politician) =

American politician

11th Mayor of Charleston
- In office 1801–1802
- Preceded by: Thomas Roper
- Succeeded by: David Deas

Personal details
- Born: February 14, 1767
- Died: September 19, 1816 (aged 49) New York City, US
- Party: Federalist
- Spouse: Mary Somersall (m. 1793)
- Profession: Lawyer

John Ward (February 14, 1767 – September 19, 1816) was the eleventh intendent (mayor) of Charleston, South Carolina, serving one term from 1801 to 1802.

== Early life and education ==
Ward was born on February 14, 1767, to Joshua Ward and Sarah McCall. He was admitted to the South Carolina bar in 1787, married Mary Somersall in 1793, and then was elected intendant on September 14, 1801. Ward represented St. John's Parish (Colleton County) in the South Carolina State House during four General Assemblies, 1791–1797. Between 1798 and 1809, he represented the area in the South Carolina Senate. He was the Federalist nominee for the U.S. Senate in 1800, losing to John E. Colhoun by two votes in the state legislature.

Ward died on September 19, 1816.

Preceded by Thomas Roper	Mayor of Charleston, South Carolina; 1801–1802	Succeeded by David Deas
