= John Schnierle =

American politician

34th Mayor of Charleston
- In office April 18, 1842 – 1846
- Preceded by: Jacob F. Mintzing
- Succeeded by: Thomas Leger Hutchinson
- In office 1850–1852
- Preceded by: Thomas Leger Hutchinson
- Succeeded by: Thomas Leger Hutchinson

Personal details
- Born: May 15, 1808; Charleston, SC
- Died: April 14, 1861 (aged 52); Charleston, South Carolina
- Spouse: Eliza Susan Reed Horsey
- Profession: Lawyer

John Schnierle (1808–1861) was the thirty-fourth mayor of Charleston, South Carolina, serving from 1842 to 1846. He was sworn into another term as mayor of Charleston on September 6, 1843. While mayor, he lived at 31 Pitt Street. He died on April 14, 1861. In September 1851, he defeated T. Leger Hutchinson by a vote of 1,334 to 1,282.

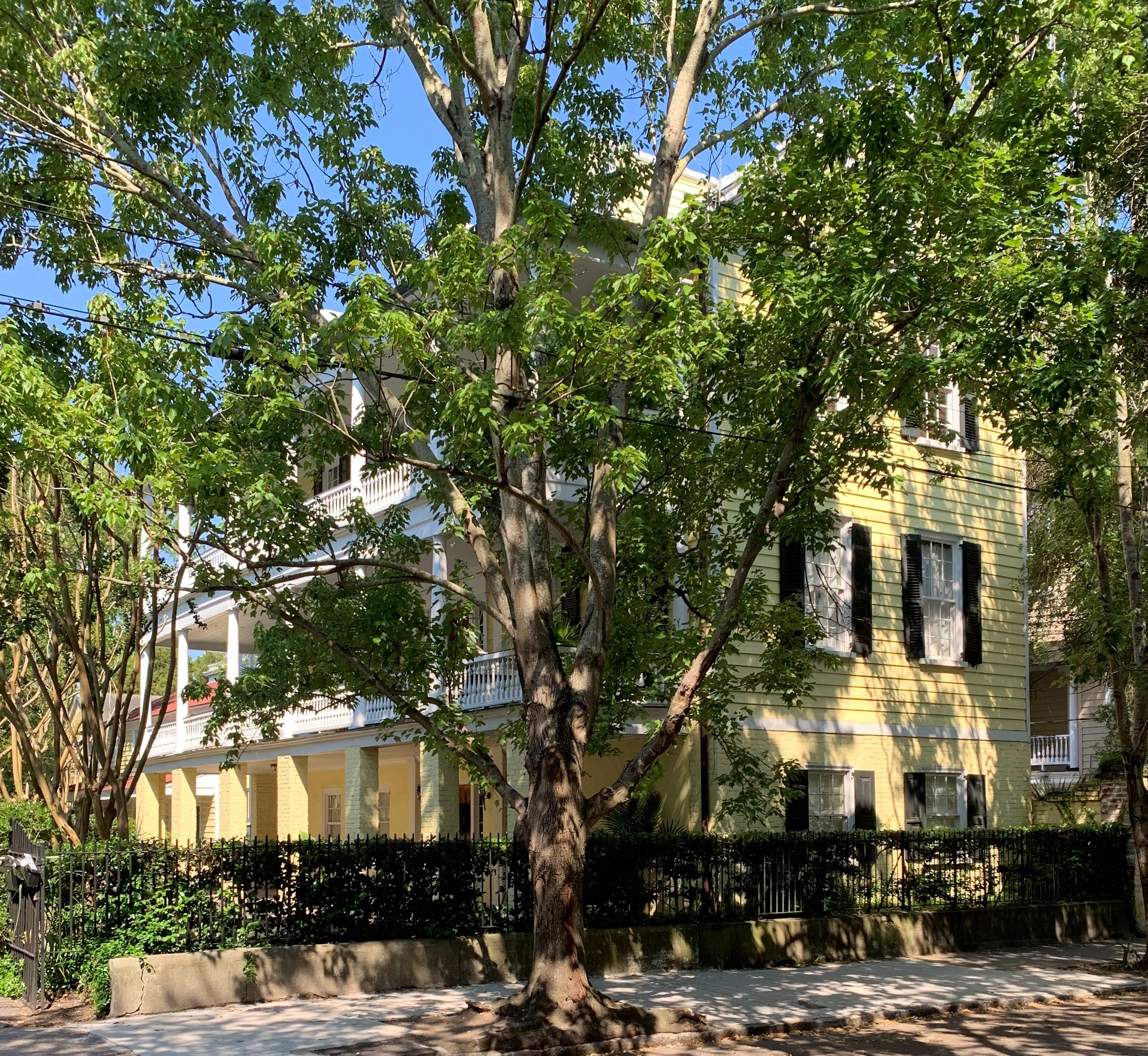
At least during his second term as mayor of Charleston, Schnierle lived at 31 Pitt Street.

Preceded by Jacob F. Mintzing	Mayor of Charleston, South Carolina; 1842–1846	Succeeded by Thomas Leger Hutchinson
Preceded by Thomas Leger Hutchinson	Mayor of Charleston, South Carolina; 1850–1852	Succeeded by Thomas Leger Hutchinson
