= Thomas Bennett Jr. =

American politician (1781–1865)

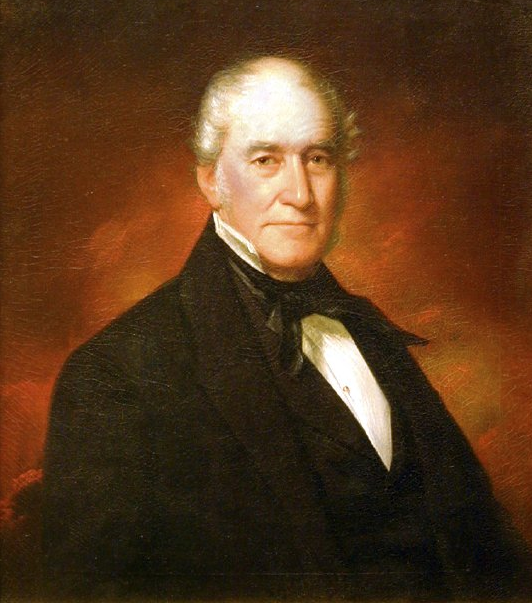

48th Governor of South Carolina
- In office December 1, 1820 – December 1, 1822
- Lieutenant: William Pinckney
- Preceded by: John Geddes
- Succeeded by: John Lyde Wilson

Member of the South Carolina Senate from St. Philip's and St. Michael's Parish
- In office November 28, 1837 – November 23, 1840; Alongside Daniel Elliott Huger
- Preceded by: Joel Poinsett
- Succeeded by: Ker Boyce
- In office November 27, 1820 – December 7, 1820; Alongside Philip Moser
- Preceded by: James Reid Pringle
- Succeeded by: William Crafts Jr.

17th Speaker of the South Carolina House of Representatives
- In office November 28, 1814 – November 23, 1818
- Governor: David Rogerson Williams; Andrew Pickens
- Preceded by: John Geddes
- Succeeded by: Robert Y. Hayne

Member of the South Carolina House of Representatives from St. Philip's and St. Michael's Parish
- In office September 15, 1813 – November 23, 1818
- In office November 23, 1812 – December 19, 1812
- In office November 28, 1808 – November 26, 1810
- In office November 26, 1804 – November 24, 1806

20th Intendant of Charleston, South Carolina
- In office 1812–1813
- Preceded by: Thomas McCalla
- Succeeded by: Thomas Rhett Smith

Personal details
- Born: August 14, 1781 Charleston, South Carolina, US
- Died: January 30, 1865 (aged 83) South Carolina, C.S.A.
- Party: Democratic-Republican
- Spouse(s): Mary Lightbourn Stone; Jane (Burgess) Gordon

Thomas Bennett Jr. (August 14, 1781 – January 30, 1865) was an American businessman, banker and politician, the 48th governor of South Carolina from 1820 to 1822. A respected politician, he had served several terms in the state legislature since 1804, including four years as Speaker of the House, and a term in the state Senate.

== Early life and career ==
Born in Charleston to an upper-class family, Bennett was educated at the College of Charleston. In a partnership with his father, Bennett ran a lumber and rice milling operation near the city. He also worked as an architect and as a banker, managing the Planters and Merchant Bank of South Carolina and the Bank of the State of South Carolina. Bennett's brother-in-law was Justice William Johnson, an associate justice on the Supreme Court of the United States from 1804 to 1834.

== Political career ==
Bennett was elected to a number of local positions for the city of Charleston, including Intendant (mayor). The prosperous city was a center of trade, including that for slaves. Beginning in 1804, Bennett was elected to the South Carolina House of Representatives for three non-consecutive terms. In 1818, he was elected to the South Carolina Senate.

In 1820, the General Assembly elected him as the Governor of South Carolina for the customary two-year term (the state wanted to limit executive power). As governor, Bennett denounced the interstate domestic slave trade. In 1818 the legislature repealed a law that prohibited it. (In 1808 the US prohibition of the African slave trade had been implemented. More than one million African-American slaves would be forcibly relocated to the Deep South in the domestic trade before the Civil War.)

=== Denmark Vesey rebellion and trial ===
In mid-June 1822, Charleston white residents were alarmed by reports that a conspiracy had been discovered for a slave rebellion led by free black man Denmark Vesey. The city organized a militia and rapidly arrested a growing circle of suspected conspirators. A Court of Magistrates and Freeholders operated in secret to hear testimony and judge who was guilty. Four household slaves of Bennett were charged as conspirators; three were found guilty and were among five slaves hanged with Vesey on July 2.

Bennett was concerned about the way the court was conducting its work and consulted with the state attorney general, Robert Y. Hayne, who advised him that the right of habeas corpus was available only to freemen. In August after the proceedings had ended, Bennett published an article suggesting the insurrection had been exaggerated. He lost the public argument to Intendant James Hamilton, who stressed that white residents had been saved by the city government's quick action. Bennett also submitted a report to the legislature critical of the secret proceedings of the court.

== Later life and career ==
After leaving the governorship in 1822, Bennett returned to Charleston. In about 1825, he constructed a house and lived there; today it is known as the Gov. Thomas Bennett House and listed on the National Register of Historic Places. Later, he was elected to the legislature a final time as a state senator, serving from 1837 to 1840, when he became well known as a Unionist. He died on January 30, 1865, in the last year of the Civil War and was buried at Magnolia Cemetery in Charleston.

Bennett is the namesake to the city of Bennettsville, South Carolina.

Political offices
Preceded by John Rutledge	Governor of South Carolina; 1820–1822	Succeeded by John Lyde Wilson
Preceded by Thomas H. McCalla	Mayor of Charleston, South Carolina; 1812–1813	Succeeded by Thomas Rhett Smith
