= Charles Cochran (cricketer) =

English cricketer

Charles Cochran (31 August 1800 – 9 September 1885) was an English cricketer associated with Surrey and Epsom Cricket Club who was active in the 1810s. He is recorded in one match only i.e., Hampshire vs Epsom at Epsom on August 25, 1819, totalling 7 runs with a highest score of 6.

== Bibliography ==
- Haygarth, Arthur (1996) [1862]. Scores & Biographies, Volume 1 (1744–1826). Kennington: Frederick Lillywhite. ISBN 978-19-00592-23-9.
