= John Geddes (politician) =

American politician (1777–1828)

John M. Geddes

47th Governor of South Carolina
- In office December 1, 1818 – December 1, 1820
- Lieutenant: William Youngblood
- Preceded by: Andrew Pickens
- Succeeded by: Thomas Bennett Jr.

23rd Mayor of Charleston, South Carolina
- In office 1817–1818
- Preceded by: Elias Horry
- Succeeded by: Daniel Stevens
- In office 1823–1824
- Preceded by: James Hamilton Jr.
- Succeeded by: Samuel Prioleau

Member of the South Carolina Senate from St. Philip's and St. Michael's Parish
- In office November 25, 1816 – December 8, 1818

16th Speaker of the South Carolina House of Representatives
- In office November 23, 1812 – November 28, 1814
- Governor: Henry Middleton; Joseph Alston
- Preceded by: Joseph Alston
- Succeeded by: Thomas Bennett Jr.

Member of the South Carolina House of Representatives from St. Philip's and St. Michael's Parish
- In office November 26, 1810 – November 25, 1816

Personal details
- Born: December 25, 1777 Charleston, South Carolina, US
- Died: March 4, 1828 (aged 50) Charleston, South Carolina, US
- Party: Democratic-Republican
- Spouse(s): Harriet Chalmers; Ann Chalmers

John Geddes (December 25, 1777 – March 4, 1828) was the 47th governor of South Carolina from 1818 to 1820.

== Early life and career ==
Born in Charleston, Geddes was the son of a merchant and received his education at the College of Charleston. He then studied law and was admitted to the bar in 1797. Afterwards, Geddes became active with the South Carolina militia as a Cavalry Major and later as a Major General.

== Political career ==
In 1808, Geddes won election to the South Carolina House of Representatives and became Speaker of the House for two years. He was a member of the House of Representatives until his election to the South Carolina Senate in 1816. The General Assembly chose Geddes to be the Governor of South Carolina in 1818 for a two-year term because of his strong Republican views.

== Later life and career ==
Upon leaving the governorship in 1820, Geddes was given the position of Brigadier General of the South Carolina militia. In 1821, he purchased the island of Key West from a sloop trader, but could not secure the rights of the island before John W. Simonton, who also claimed the island and was helped by some influential friends in Washington, D.C. He remained active in politics and ran for mayor of Charleston in 1823, serving from 1824 to 1825. Having felt that his honor was insulted by Edward P. Simons during the campaign, Geddes challenged Simons to a duel. Simons managed to fire four shots, two hitting Geddes' son in both of his thighs, but the duel resulted in Simons' death. Geddes died in Charleston on March 4, 1828, and was buried at the First (Scots) Presbyterian Church in Charleston.

| Preceded by Andrew Pickens | Governor of South Carolina; 1818–1820 | Succeeded by Thomas Bennett Jr. |
| Preceded by Joseph Alston | Speaker of the South Carolina House of Representatives; 1810–1814 | Succeeded by Thomas Bennett Jr. |
| Preceded by Elias Horry | Mayor of Charleston, South Carolina; 1817–1818 | Succeeded by Daniel Stevens |
| Preceded by James Hamilton Jr. | Mayor of Charleston, South Carolina; 1823–1824 | Succeeded by Samuel Prioleau |
