= Thomas Roper (mayor) =

American politician

10th Mayor of Charleston
- In office 1799–1801
- Preceded by: Henry William de Saussure
- Succeeded by: John Ward

Personal details
- Born: 1760
- Died: April 15, 1829 (aged 68–69)

Thomas Roper (1760-1829) was the tenth intendent (mayor) of Charleston, South Carolina, serving two terms between 1799 and 1801. As mayor of Charleston, he was influential in the move to build a chapel at the Charleston Orphan House; it was completed in 1801. He died on April 15, 1829. Because his only son died without an heir in 1845, Roper's real estate on East Battery and Queen Streets (worth $30,000) passed to the Medical Society of South Carolina. Roper Hospital is named in his honor.

Preceded by Henry William de Saussure	Mayor of Charleston, South Carolina; 1799–1801	Succeeded by John Ward
