= List of mayors of Charleston, South Carolina =

The mayor is the highest elected official in Charleston, South Carolina. Since the city's incorporation in 1783, Charleston's chief executive officer has been elected directly by qualified voters, except for the years 1867–1868, when mayors were appointed by Federal officials. The position was known as intendant until 1836, and has been known as "mayor" since that time. In 2012, the annual mayoral salary was $162,815.90.

== Intendants and mayors of Charleston, South Carolina ==
#	Mayor	Party	Sworn in	Left office	Comments
1	Richard Hutson		1783	1785	
2	Arnoldus Vanderhorst		1785	1786	
3	John Faucheraud Grimké		1786	1788 (Note: Grimké resigned on September 15, 1788.)	
4	Rawlins Lowndes		1788 (Note: Rawlins Lowndes succeeded Grimké on September 29, 1788, and served the remainder of his term, which expired in 1789.)	1789	
5	Thomas Jones		1789	1790	
(2)	Arnoldus Vanderhorst		1790	1792	
6	John Huger		1792	1794	
7	John Bee Holmes		1794	1795	
8	John Edwards		1795	1797	
9	Henry William de Saussure	Federalist	1797	1799	Member of the South Carolina House of Representatives in 1791; Attorney, indigo planter and slave owner
10	Thomas Roper		1799	1801	
11	John Ward		1801	1802	
12	David Deas		1802	1803	
13	John Drayton	Democratic-Republican	1803	1804	
14	Thomas Winstanley		1804	1805	
15	Charles Cochran		1805	1806	
16	John Dawson Jr.		1806	1808 (Note: Dawson resigned in July 1808.)	
17	Benjamin Boyd		1808 (Note: Benjamin Boyd succeeded Dawson on July 22, 1808, and served the remainder of his term, which expired in the same year.)	1808	
18	William Rouse		1808	1810	
19	Thomas H. McCalla		1810	1812	
20	Thomas Bennett Jr.	Democratic-Republican	1812	1813	
21	Thomas Rhett Smith	Federalist	1813	1815 (Note: Smith resigned in March 1815. Elias Horry succeeded him on March 30 of the same year.)	
22	Elias Horry		1815	1817	
23	John Geddes	Democratic-Republican	1817	1818 (Note: Geddes resigned in December 1818.)	Once a Member of the South Carolina State Legislature; Governor of South Carolina from 1818 to 1820
24	Daniel Stevens		1819 (Note: Stevens succeeded Geddes on January 11, 1819, and served the remainder of his term, which expired in the same year.)	1820	
(22)	Elias Horry		1820	1821	
25	James Hamilton Jr.	Democratic-Republican	1821	1822 (Note: Hamilton resigned in December 1822.)	U.S. Representative from 1822 to 1829; Governor of South Carolina from 1830 to 1832
(23)	John Geddes	Democratic-Republican	1823 (Note: John Geddes succeeded Hamilton on January 6, 1823, and served the remainder of his term, which expired in the same year.)	1824	
26	Samuel Prioleau	Federalist	1824	1825	
27	Joseph Johnson	Whig	1825	1827	
28	John Gadsden		1827	1829	Once a Member of the South Carolina State Legislature
29	Henry L. Pinckney	Democrat (Nullifier)	1829	1830	
30	James R. Pringle	Democrat (Unionist)	1830	1831	
(29)	Henry L. Pinckney	Democrat (Nullifier)	1831	1833	
31	Edward W. North		1833	1836	
32	Robert Young Hayne	Democrat (Nullifier)	1836	1837	U.S. Senator from 1823 to 1832; Governor of South Carolina from 1832 to 1834; First chief executive officer of Charleston known as Mayor of Charleston
(29)	Henry L. Pinckney	Democrat (Nullifier)	1837	1840	
33	Jacob F. Mintzing	Democrat (Unionist)	1840	1842 (Note: Mintzing died in office on March 15, 1842.)	Once a Member of the South Carolina State Legislature
34	John Schnierle	Democrat	1842 (Note: John Schnierle succeeded Mintzing on April 4, 1842, and served the remainder of his term, which expired in the same year.)	1846	2nd German-American mayor Attorney; Major General with the 16th Regiment of South Carolina Militia
35	Thomas Leger Hutchinson	Democrat	1846	1850	
(34)	John Schnierle	Democrat	1850	1852	
(35)	Thomas Leger Hutchinson	Democrat	1852	1855	
36	William Porcher Miles	Democrat	1855	1857	
37	Charles Macbeth	Democrat	1857	1865 (Note: On February 18, 1865, Mayor Charles MacBeth surrendered Charleston to Lieutenant Colonel A.G. Bennett of the 21st US Colored Troops.)	
38	Peter Charles Gaillard	Democrat	1865	1868	Gaillard was a lieutenant colonel in the Confederate Army. He was removed from office by Federal authorities.
39	William Wallace Burns	Military appointment	1868	1868	
40	Milton Cogswell	Military appointment	1868	1868	
41	George Washington Clark	Military appointment	1868	1868	
42	Gilbert Pillsbury	Republican	1868	1871	Pillsbury was Charleston's Reconstruction mayor. He made career with the Freedmen's Bureau.
43	Johann Andreas Wagener	Democrat	1871	1873	German-American and Lutheran mayor Wagener had been a Confederate General. He founded St. Matthew's German Evangelical Lutheran Church in 1840 and is buried in its Bethany Cemetery.
44	George I. Cunningham	Republican	1873	1877	
45	William W. Sale	Democrat	1877	1879	
46	William Ashmead Courtenay	Democrat	1879	1887	
47	George D. Bryan	Democrat	1887	1891	
48	John F. Ficken	Democrat	1891	1895	
49	James Adger Smyth	Democrat	1895	1903	
50	R. Goodwyn Rhett	Democrat	1903	1911	
51	John P. Grace	Democrat	1911	1915	1st Irish-American and Catholic mayor The John P. Grace Memorial Bridge was named to honor him.
52	Tristram T. Hyde	Democrat	1915	1919	
(51)	John P. Grace	Democrat	1919	1923	
53	Thomas Porcher Stoney	Democrat	1923	1931	
54	Burnet Rhett Maybank	Democrat	1931	1938 (Note: Maybank resigned on December 27, 1938.)	Governor of South Carolina from 1939 to 1941; U.S. Senator from 1941 to 1954
55	Henry Whilden Lockwood	Democrat	1938 (Note: Henry Whilden Lockwood succeeded Maybank on December 27, 1938, and served the remainder of his term, which expired in 1939.)	1944 (Note: Lockwood died in office on June 5, 1944.)	
56	E. Edward Wehman Jr.	Democrat	1944 (Note: E. Edward Wehman Jr. was appointed by the City Council to succeed Lockwood in 1944 and served the remainder of his term, which expired in 1947.)	1947	
57	William McG. Morrison	Democrat	1947	1959	
58	J. Palmer Gaillard Jr.	Democrat	1959	1975	
59	Arthur B. Schirmer Jr.	Democrat	1975 (Note: Arthur B. Schirmer Jr. succeeded Gaillard on August 19, 1975, and served the remainder of his term, which expired in the same year.)	1975	
60	Joseph P. Riley Jr.	Democrat	1975	2014	Riley was the city's longest serving executive and second Irish Catholic mayor.
61	John Tecklenburg	Democrat	2014	2023	
62	William S. Cogswell Jr.	Republican	2023	Present	William was the first Republican mayor of Charleston since 1877.

== See also ==
- Timeline of Charleston, South Carolina
