= Daniel Stevens (politician) =

American politician

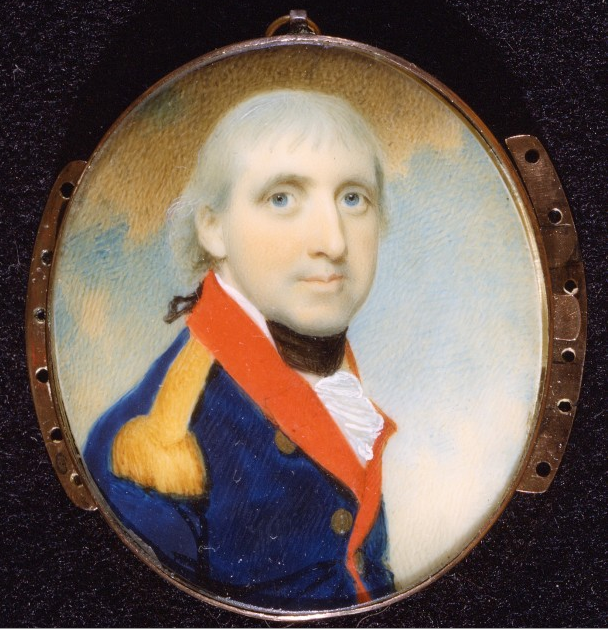

24th Mayor of Charleston
- In office 1819–1820
- Preceded by: John Geddes
- Succeeded by: Elias Horry

Personal details
- Born: 1746
- Died: March 20, 1835 (aged 88–89)
- Profession: Merchant

Daniel Stevens was the twenty-fourth intendant (mayor) of Charleston, South Carolina, serving from 1819 to 1820.

Stevens was elected as a warden (city council member) in August 1808. He ran for the office of intendant of Charleston on September 16, 1816 but was defeated by Elias Horry.

Stevens was elected intendant (mayor) on January 11, 1819, replacing John Geddes, who had been elected governor of South Carolina. He was then re-elected on September 6, 1819.

Stevens was born in 1746 to Samuel Stevens and Catherine Willard and died on March 20, 1835. He married three times: to Patience Catherine Norton (1767); to Sarah Sprowle (1770); and to Mary Adams (1779).

Stevens served with the Charleston Rangers and Ancient Battalion of Artillery and fought in that Battle of Fort Moultrie. He was imprisoned and exiled to Philadelphia when Charleston fell in May 1780 to the British. He returned to Charleston the next year under the command of General Nathanael Greene.

After the Revolutionary War, Stevens served as Charleston District sheriff (1782–1784) and then federal supervisor of revenue (1791–1801). He served in the South Carolina statehouse was a representative for the Charleston area in 1782 and then again in 1785–1790. He represented the Beaufort District in the South Carolina Senate in 1791.

Preceded by John Geddes	Mayor of Charleston, South Carolina; 1819–1820	Succeeded by Elias Horry
