= Charles Cochran (South Carolina politician) =

American politician

Charles Burnham Cochran
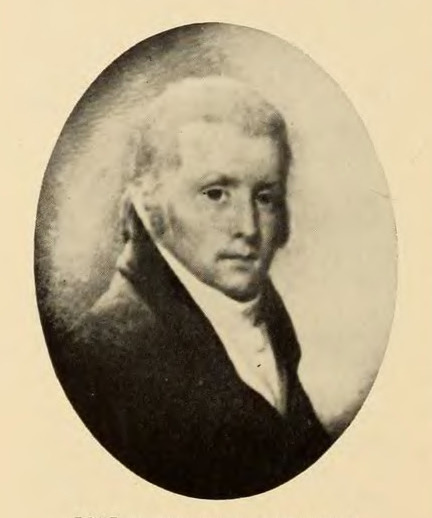
- portrait by Edward Greene Malbone

15th Mayor of Charleston
- In office 1805–1806
- Preceded by: Thomas Winstanley
- Succeeded by: John Dawson Jr.

Personal details
- Born: 1766
- Died: August 21, 1833 (aged 66–67)
- Spouse: Harriett Rachel Thomson
- Profession: Bank president (Union Bank)

Charles Burnham Cochran was the fifteenth intendant (mayor) of Charleston, South Carolina, serving one term from 1805 to 1806. He was elected on September 9, 1805. At the time, he lived at the house then-numbered 67 Meeting Street, Charleston, South Carolina. He had previously served as the federal marshal of the South Carolina District from 1795 to 1802. In 1806, he was elected treasurer of South Carolina for the lower division. Cochran died on August 21, 1833.

Preceded by Thomas Winstanley	Mayor of Charleston, South Carolina; 1805–1806	Succeeded by John Dawson Jr.
