= Andrew Pickens (governor) =

American politician

His Excellency Andrew Pickens
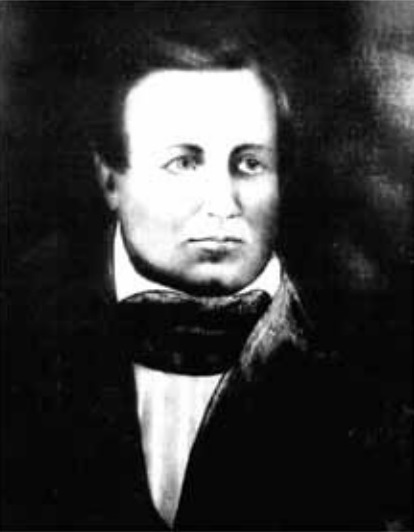

46th Governor of South Carolina
- In office December 1, 1816 – December 1, 1818
- Lieutenant: John A. Cuthbert
- Preceded by: David Rogerson Williams
- Succeeded by: John Geddes

Personal details
- Born: December 13, 1779 Edgefield County, South Carolina
- Died: June 24, 1838 (aged 58) Pontotock, Mississippi
- Party: Democratic-Republican
- Spouse(s): Susannah Smith Wilkinson; Mary Willing Nelson
- Education: College of New Jersey
- Profession: soldier, attorney

Military service
- Allegiance: United States of America
- Branch/service: United States Army
- Rank: lieutenant-colonel
- Battles/wars: War of 1812

Andrew Pickens Jr. (December 13, 1779 – June 24, 1838) was an American soldier and politician. He served as the 46th governor of South Carolina from 1816 until 1818.

== Family ==
Pickens was the son of well-known American Revolutionary general Andrew Pickens (1739–1817), and Rebecca Floride Pickens (nee Colhoun). He was born on his father's plantation on the Savannah River in Horse Creek Valley in Edgefield County, South Carolina.

He was a maternal cousin of fellow South Carolina politician John C. Calhoun. He was also a paternal cousin of Calhoun's wife Floride.

== Military service and legal career ==
Pickens attended Brown University, graduating in 1801. He served as a lieutenant-colonel in the U.S. Army during the War of 1812. After the war, he established a plantation, "Oatlands", in Edgefield County, and took up the practice of law. He also established a residence, "Halcyon Grove", in the village of Edgefield, and married Susannah Smith Wilkinson.

== Political career ==
On December 5, 1816, the South Carolina General Assembly elected Pickens as governor by secret ballot. Pickens championed the construction of roads and canals by government, a policy called internal improvements. During his administration, South Carolina began an internal improvements program. The price of cotton rose to the highest point reached in South Carolina during the antebellum period. The city of Charleston was struck with a disastrous yellow fever epidemic.

== Diplomacy with the Creek people ==
After leaving office, Pickens moved to Alabama and helped negotiate a treaty with the Creek Indians of Georgia. For a period of time around 1829, he lived in Augusta. Growing up living by Indians, he had a very tight bond with them.

== Death ==
Pickens died June 24, 1838, in Pontotoc, Mississippi, and was interred at Old Stone Church Cemetery in Clemson, South Carolina.

== Children ==
His son, Francis Wilkinson Pickens (1805–1869) was a U.S. Representative and the Governor of South Carolina when the state seceded from the Union in 1860.

Political offices
Preceded by David Rogerson Williams	Governor of South Carolina; 1816–1818	Succeeded by John Geddes
