= Tristram T. Hyde =

American politician (1862–1931)

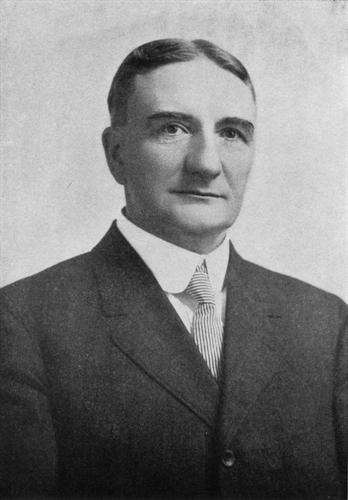
- Tristram T. Hyde in the 1919 Charleston yearbook.

52nd Mayor of Charleston
- In office 1915–1919
- Preceded by: John P. Grace
- Succeeded by: John P. Grace

Personal details
- Born: July 3, 1862 Columbia, South Carolina
- Died: January 27, 1931 (aged 68) Charleston, South Carolina
- Party: Democrat
- Spouse(s): Minnie D. Black (m. 1886–1905), Sue Estelle Thomas (m. 1907–1931)
- Children: Tristram T. Hyde, Jr.; Samuel Black Hyde; Simeon Hyde, Jr.; Edwin Hyde; Mrs. Jeannie Hyde Jenkins; Mrs. Herbert T. Taylor

Tristram Tupper Hyde (July 3, 1862 – January 27, 1931) was the mayor of Charleston, South Carolina, from 1915 to 1919.

== Early life ==
Tristram was the son of Simeon Hyde and Ann Elizabeth Tupper. He attended the High School of Charleston. He married Minnie D. Black in 1886 and Sue Estelle Thomas 1907.

Hyde was a real estate broker with Eben Coffin and Co. and then Tristram T. Hyde and Sons. He was also president of Commercial Savings Bank, White Swan-Ideal Laundry and Francis Marion (Hotel]) Corporation.

== Mayor ==
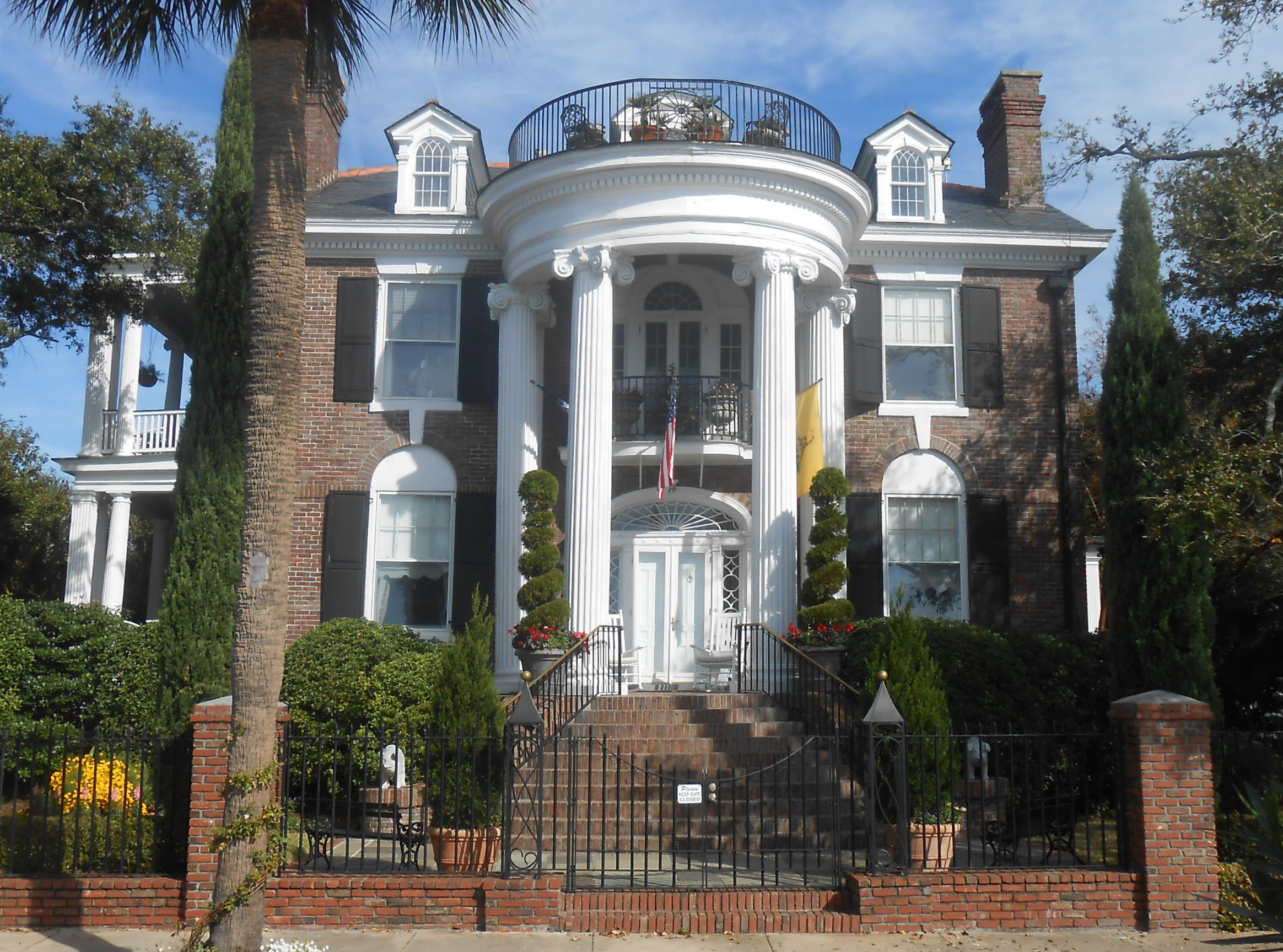
Tristram Hyde's home at 74 Murray Blvd. in Charleston was designed by Albert Wheeler Todd.

In 1915, supported by former Mayor R. Goodwyn Rhett, Hyde ran against incumbent John P. Grace for mayor. Hyde was supported by the Charleston elites in his race against Grace who was considered a populist. Hyde won the election by a mere margin of 14 votes. Three days later, an Election recount was held on the corner of King St. and George St. which resulted in the shooting death of a News and Courier reporter, Sidney J. Cohen. Grace conceded the election shortly afterwards.

Hyde was fiscally conservative and sought to lower government expenditure. In contrast to Grace, Hyde was tough on bootleggers. In 1919, Grace and Hyde squared off again in another close election. Hyde lost by a small margin.

One notable development of Hyde's tenure in office was the ceding of a large portion of Hampton Park to the state for use in building a new campus for The Citadel so that the school remained in Charleston. He also aided in the formation of a public waterworks.

In private affairs, he was engaged in diverse business interests including being one of the principal backers of the company that built the Fort Sumter Hotel on the Battery.

== Later life ==
He is buried at Magnolia Cemetery (Charleston, South Carolina).

Political offices
Preceded by John P. Grace	Mayor of Charleston, South Carolina; 1915–1919	Succeeded by John P. Grace
