= 1909 United States Senate election in South Carolina =

1908 Democratic Senate primary in South Carolina
- September 8, 1908
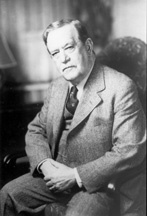

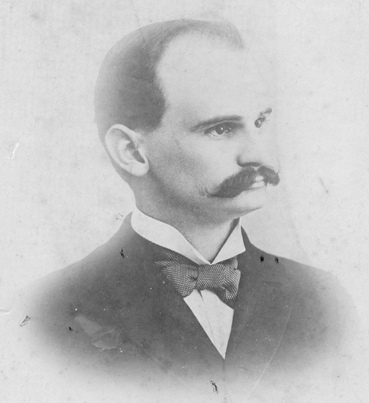
Nominee	Ellison D. Smith	John Gary Evans
Party	Democratic	Democratic
Popular vote	69,318	39,655
Percentage	63.6%	36.4%
U.S. senator before election
Frank B. Gary
Democratic
Elected U.S. Senator
Ellison D. Smith
Democratic

The 1909 South Carolina United States Senate election was held on January 26, 1909. Its outcome was determined by a Democratic Party primary election held on August 25 and September 8, 1908. Interim Senator Frank B. Gary, who had been elected to complete the unfinished term of the late Senator Asbury Latimer, did not run for re-election. Democrat Ellison D. Smith won the Democratic primary and was elected by the General Assembly for a six-year term.

== Background ==
Prior to the ratification of the Seventeenth Amendment to the United States Constitution, U.S. senators were elected by state legislatures rather than the direct election by the people of the state. However, the South Carolina Democratic Party organized non-binding primary elections for the U.S. Senate beginning in 1896, and the South Carolina General Assembly confirmed the choice of the Democratic voters.

== Democratic primary ==
=== Candidates ===
- John Gary Evans, former Governor of South Carolina (1894–97)
- John P. Grace, candidate for State Senate in 1902 and Charleston County Sheriff in 1904
- George Johnstone, former U.S. Representative from Newberry County (1891–93)
- William W. Lumpkin
- O.B. Martin
- R. Goodwin Rhett
- Ellison D. Smith, former State Representative and leading advocate for the cotton industry

=== Campaign ===
Ellison D. Smith, an official in the Cotton Association and often called "Cotton Ed", entered the Democratic primary but found himself in early trouble when he promised that cotton would rise to eighteen cents and it did not occur. However, his rhetorical skills allowed him to take command of the stump and attract voters to his campaign.

Former Governor John Gary Evans was making his fourth straight attempt for the Senate seat and received the private support of Senator Ben Tillman. The tide of Tillmanism had receded in the state and the public endorsement by Tillman would doom a candidate's prospects. Smith and Evans emerged as the top two candidates were to face each other in a runoff election on September 8. Evans once again failed to carry the day and Smith scored a resounding victory.

=== Results ===
1908 Democratic U.S. Senate primary
Party	Candidate	Votes	%
Democratic	Ellison D. Smith	30,012	28.2%
Democratic	John Gary Evans	27,589	26.0%
Democratic	R. Goodwin Rhett	22,422	21.1%
Democratic	George Johnstone	13,656	12.8%
Democratic	O.B. Martin	6,802	6.4%
Democratic	William W. Lumpkin	4,361	4.1%
Democratic	John P. Grace	1,497	1.4%
Total votes		106,339	100.00%

=== Runoff ===
1908 Democratic U.S. Senate runoff
Party	Candidate	Votes	%	±%
Democratic	Ellison D. Smith	69,318	63.6%	▲35.4
Democratic	John Gary Evans	39,655	36.4%	▲10.4

== Election ==
Smith was elected unanimously by the South Carolina Legislature on January 26, 1909.

== See also ==
- List of United States senators from South Carolina
- 1908–09 United States Senate elections
- 1908 United States House of Representatives elections in South Carolina
- 1908 South Carolina gubernatorial election
