= Albert W. Todd House =

Historic house in Charleston, North Carolina

Coordinates: 32.773010°N 79.929584°W

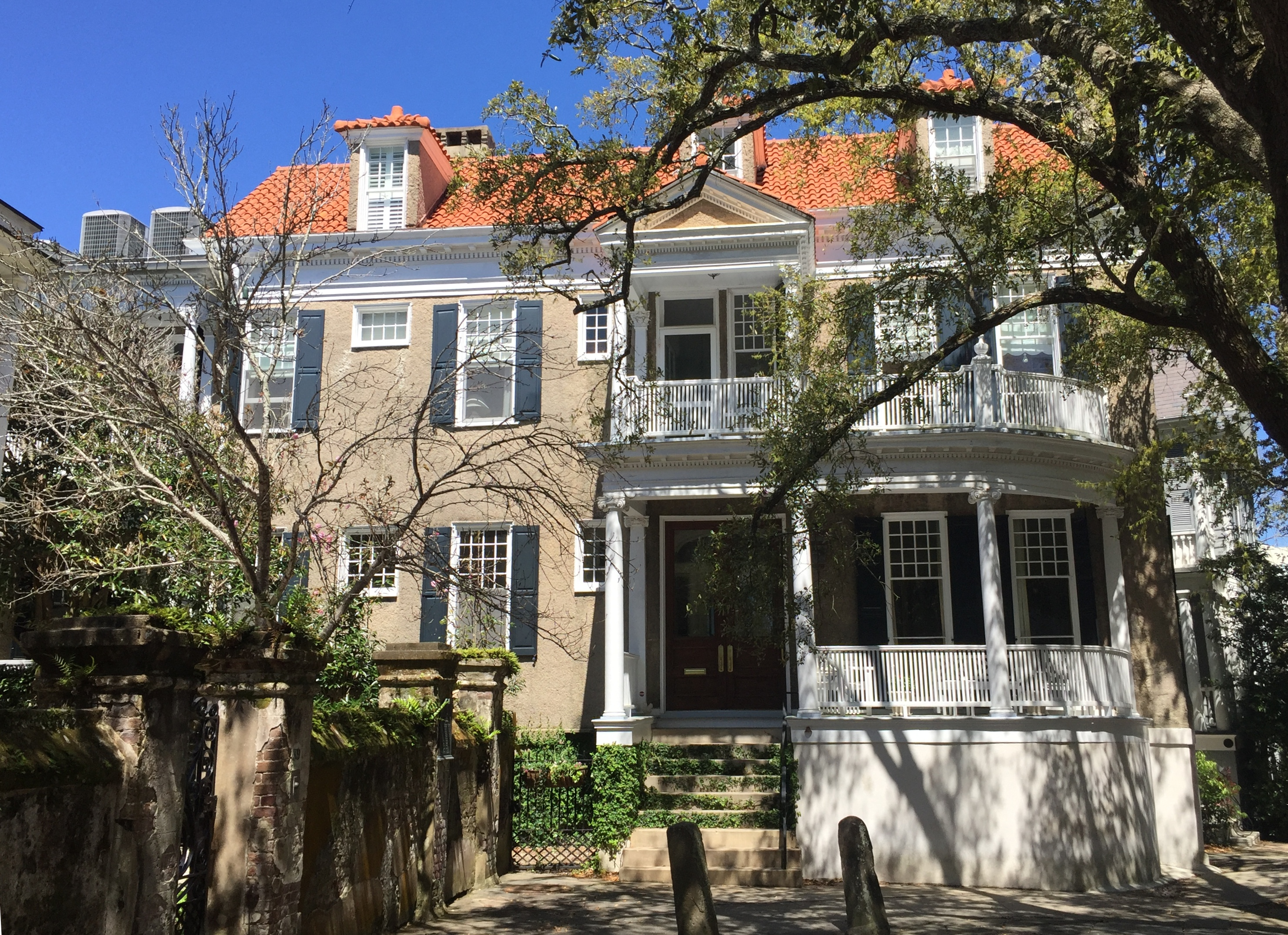
41 Church St. was built in 1909 for architect Albert Todd.

The Albert W. Todd House is a historic house at 41 Church St., Charleston, South Carolina. It was built in November 1909 by architect Albert Wheeler Todd for his own family's residence. At the time, Todd was living nearby at 50 Church St., and he was attracted to the lot. Local lore says that he built his house on a dare, challenging the proposition that a house could not be built on a lot 150 feet deep but only 25 feet wide. Although the odd location of the garage entry on the ground floor through the base of the chimney is cited as proof of the tale, Todd's widow denied ever having heard of such a dare. The house is an early example of stucco over wood construction in Charleston.
