= Arthur Ravenel Jr. Bridge =

Cable-stayed bridge over the Cooper River in South Carolina, US

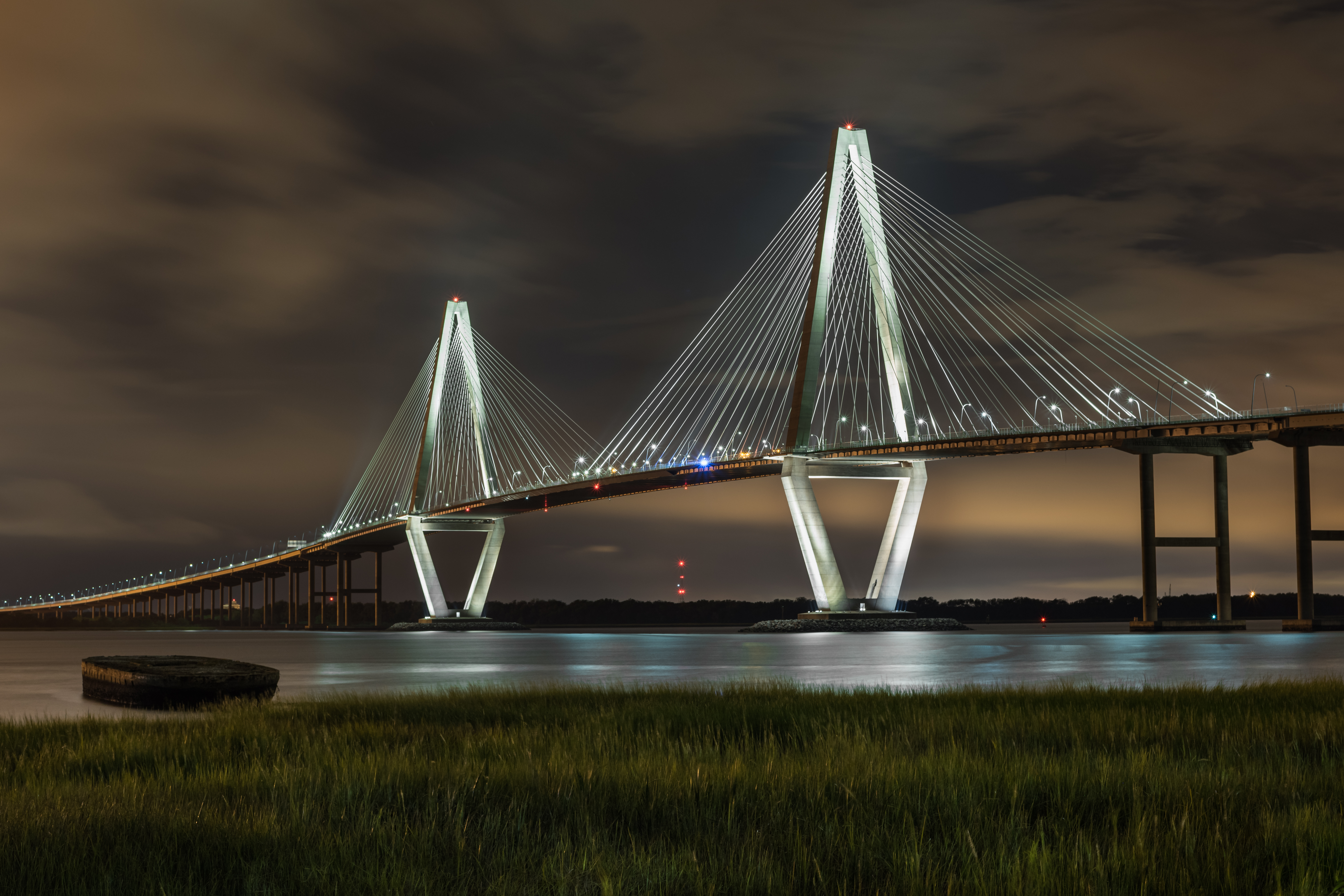
- As seen from Mount Pleasant
- Coordinates: 32°48′10″N 79°54′54″W
- Carries: Bikes, pedestrians 8 lanes of US 17
- Crosses: Cooper River
- Locale: From: Charleston, SC; To: Mt. Pleasant, SC
- Official name: Arthur Ravenel Jr. Bridge
- Other name(s): The Ravenel Bridge; Cooper River Bridge
- Maintained by: SCDOT

Characteristics
- Design: Cable-stayed bridge
- Total length: 13,200 feet (4,000 m)
- Width: Eight 12-foot (3.7 m) lanes
- Height: 575 feet (175 m)
- Longest span: 1,546 feet (471 m)
- Clearance below: 186 feet (57 m)

History
- Opened: July 16, 2005; 21 years ago
- Replaces: John P. Grace Memorial Bridge; Silas N. Pearman Bridge

Statistics
- Daily traffic: 96,300

Location
- Interactive map of Arthur Ravenel Jr. Bridge

The Arthur Ravenel Jr. Bridge (colloquially referred to as the Ravenel Bridge and the Cooper River Bridge) is a cable-stayed bridge over the Cooper River in South Carolina, US, connecting downtown Charleston to Mount Pleasant. The bridge has a main span of 1,546 feet (471 m), the seventh longest among cable-stayed bridges in the Western Hemisphere. It was built using the design–build method and was designed by Parsons Brinckerhoff. Since its opening in 2005 the bridge has been considered an icon of Charleston and is one of the city's most recognizable landmarks.

== History ==
The first bridge to cross the lower Cooper River opened in 1929, eventually named the John P. Grace Memorial Bridge for former Charleston mayor John P. Grace, who spearheaded the project. The main span of the double cantilever truss bridge was the fifth-longest in the world at 1,050 feet (320 m) and soared 150 feet (46 m) above the river. The mainspan of the second cantilever was the twelfth-longest in the world. The total length of the structure was about 2.7 miles (4.3 km). Following a 17-month construction at a cost of $6 million, it opened with a three-day celebration that attracted visitors from around the globe. Engineers and critics proclaimed colorful descriptions of the unique structure, deeming it "the first roller-coaster bridge" and citing that "steep approaches, stupendous height, extremely narrow width, and a sharp curve at the dip conspire to excite and alarm the motorist." Privately owned originally, a $1.00 toll was charged for car and driver to cross. In 1943, the state of South Carolina purchased the bridge, and the tolls were lifted in 1946.

By the 1960s, the Grace Memorial Bridge had become functionally obsolete, with its two narrow 10-foot (3.0 m) lanes built for Ford Model As and its steep grades of up to six percent. Later, changes to the side rail and curb reduced the lane width further. A new bridge was constructed alongside and parallel to it. Named for the then–South Carolina Highway Commissioner, the Silas N. Pearman Bridge opened in 1966 at cost of $15 million (equivalent to $148.85 million in 2025). Its three lanes, at a modern 12-foot (3.7 m) width, opened to northbound traffic, while its older counterpart carried the southbound traffic into downtown Charleston. One lane was reversible on the Pearman bridge, which led to signs warning "Use lanes with green arrow" and "Do not use red X lane" on the bridge.

The Grace Bridge had become structurally deficient by the late 1970s, and the Pearman Bridge had become functionally obsolete in 1979. Extensive metal deterioration caused by the lack of maintenance shortly after Grace Bridge's tolls were removed limited the capacity of the older bridge to 10-short-ton (9.1 t) vehicles (later 5 short tons (4.5 t)), and the reversible lane on the Pearman was eliminated (it had been able to switch to three lanes northbound for rush hour traffic), making that lane southbound permanently diverting all heavy trucks, buses, and recreational vehicles to that lane on the Pearman bridge. Neither of the bridges had emergency lanes as the latter used of the space as a truck bypass, and the Pearman bridge had no median between the northbound and southbound lanes because of its previous use as a reversible lane. Furthermore, the vertical clearance above the river—once among the highest in the world—could no longer accommodate shipping vessels as they grew bigger over time. Three of Charleston's four shipping terminals are situated up the Cooper and Wando rivers, and the limited bridge clearance excluded the access of ships that would otherwise be beneficial to the economy of South Carolina. Now that the old bridges are disassembled, the world's largest modern container ships are able to access all terminals of the nation's fourth-largest container port.

== Construction ==
=== Funding ===
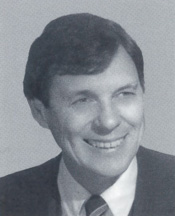
Arthur Ravenel Jr.

Raising financial support for a new eight-lane bridge over the Cooper River was a struggle 20 years in the making, prolonged by the state's insistence that it could not afford such a bridge and by Charleston's reluctance to provide any funds for the project. Several proposals were made for a toll bridge, but the mayors of Charleston and Mount Pleasant objected. When officials revealed in 1995 that the Grace Bridge scored a 4 out of 100 for safety and integrity, retired US Congressman Arthur Ravenel Jr. ran for the South Carolina Senate with a goal of solving the funding problem. He helped to establish the S.C. Infrastructure Bank and worked with local, state, and federal officials to create partnerships that helped to materialize the final funding.

The State Infrastructure Bank (SIB) budgeted $325 million to accompany $96.6 million from the Federal Highway Administration. The project did not become a reality, however, until the SIB agreed to commit to a $215 million federal loan, provided that Charleston County would contribute $3 million a year for 25 years, including an 8.33% sales tax increase, to the federal loan, as well as yearly payments from the SCDOT and State Ports Authority. The overall price of the bridge totaled around $700 million.

Due to his efforts in passing laws for the new bridge's funding, fellow lawmakers voted to name bridge the Arthur Ravenel Jr. Bridge. Some felt that the bridge should not be named after Ravenel, with the head of the South Carolina infrastructure bank saying in 1999, "Certainly, Arthur Ravenel is a fine, decent person, but that bridge is bigger than any one individual and it should reflect all the qualities of the state and not some state senator who happens to be in the Legislature the time the structure is being built."

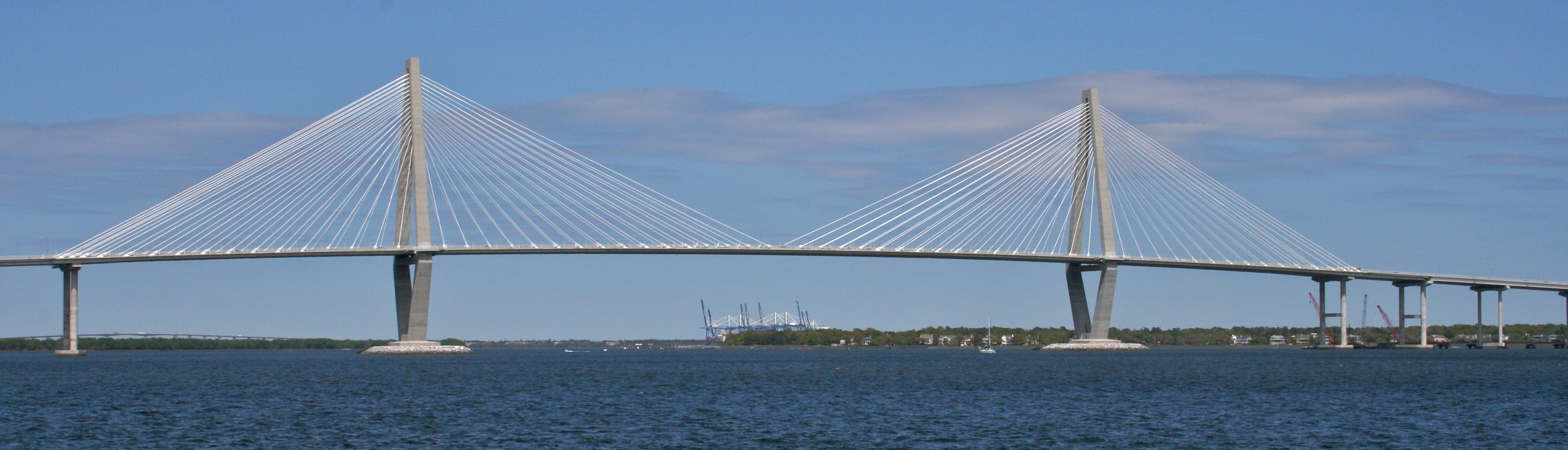
Arthur Ravenel Jr. Bridge from Charleston Harbor

=== Design ===
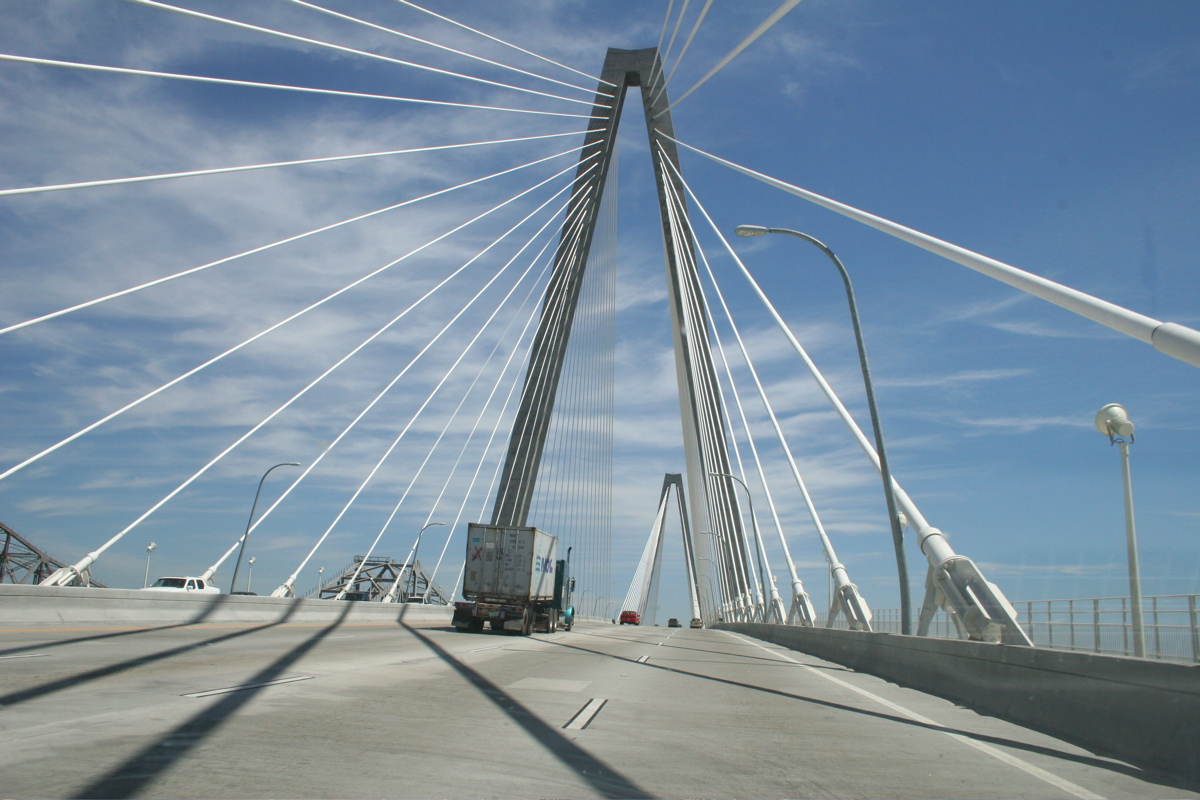
Road deck of the Arthur Ravenel Jr. Bridge

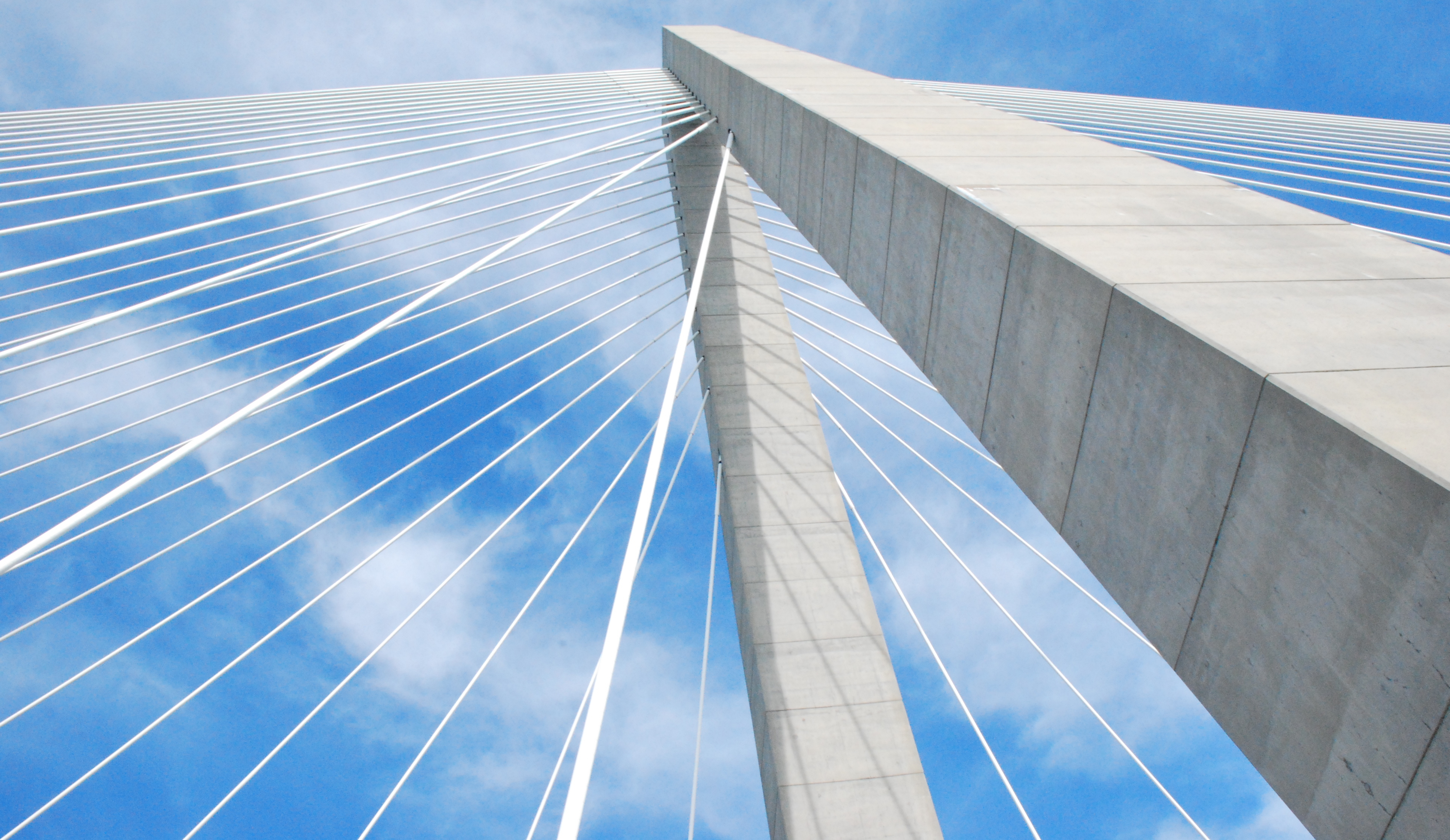
One of the two towers

The Ravenel Bridge is a cable-stayed design with two diamond-shaped towers, each 575 feet (175 m) high. The total length of the structure is 13,200 feet (4,000 m), with the mainspan stretching 1,546 feet (471 m) between the towers. Suspending the deck 186 feet (57 m) above the river are 128 individual cables anchored to the inside of the diamond towers. The roadway consists of eight 12-foot (3.7 m) lanes, four in each direction plus a 12-foot (3.7 m) bicycle and pedestrian path, which runs along the south edge of the bridge overlooking Charleston Harbor and the Atlantic Ocean.

The bridge structure is designed to withstand shipping accidents and the natural disasters that have plagued Charleston's history. The span is designed to endure wind gusts in excess of 300 mph (480 km/h), far stronger than those of the worst storm in Charleston's history, Hurricane Hugo in 1989. Engineers also considered the 1886 earthquake that nearly leveled Charleston. The Ravenel Bridge is designed to withstand an earthquake of approximately 7.4 on the Richter magnitude scale without total failure. To protect the bridge from errant ships, the towers are flanked by one-acre (0.40 ha) rock islands. Ships will run aground on the islands before colliding with the towers.

The bridge was designed for traffic of 100,000 vehicles per day, and forecasted to reach that number in 2030. As of 2018, the bridge was carrying an average of 96,300 vehicles per day. The bridge includes a shared bicycle–pedestrian path named Wonders' Way in memory of Garrett Wonders. Wonders was a US Navy ensign stationed in Charleston and was in training for the 2004 Olympics before he died in a bicycle–vehicle collision. The path was included in design of the new bridge because of grassroots efforts by groups, such as a fifth grade class at a local elementary school.

=== Construction ===
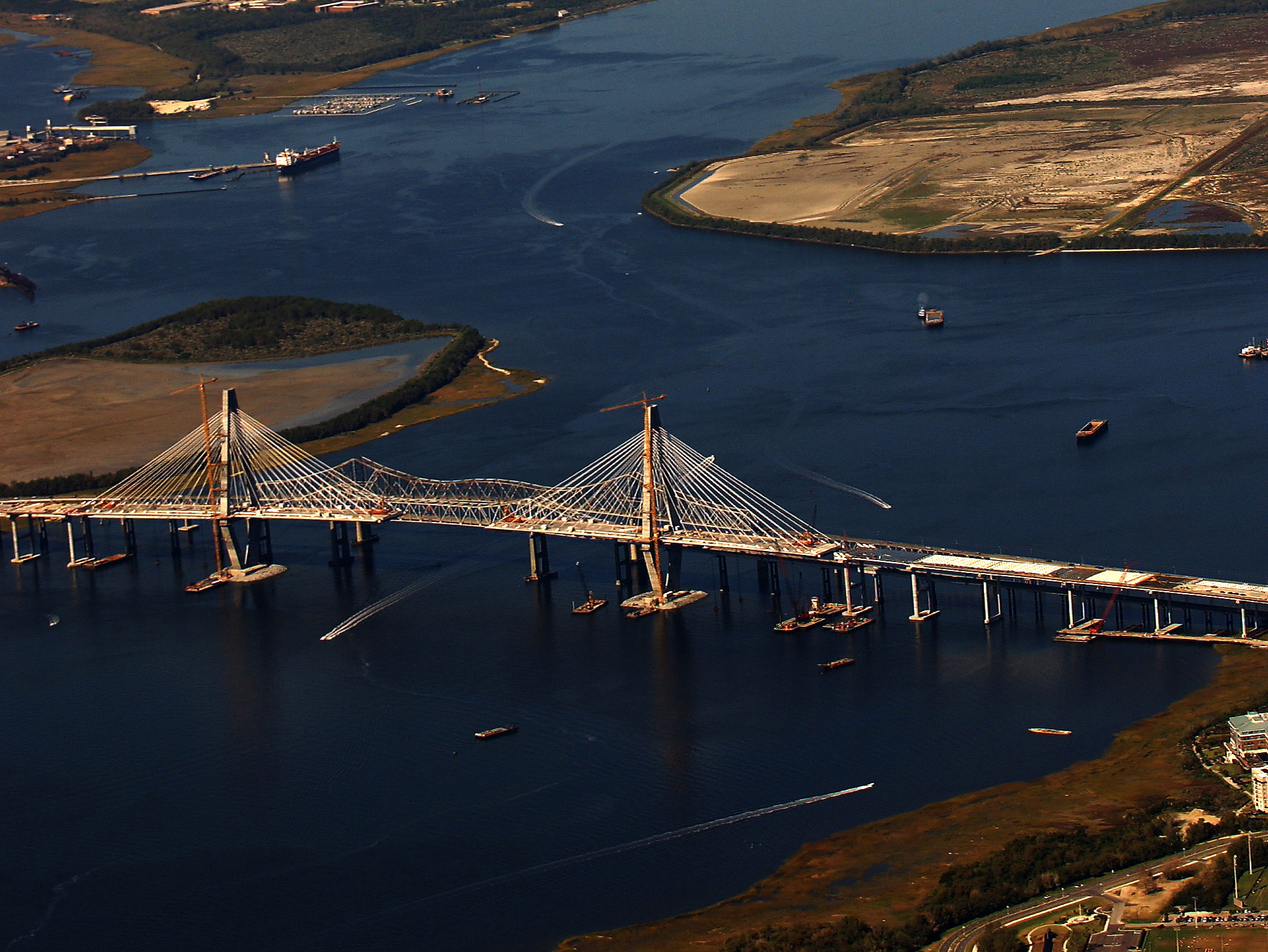
Arthur Ravenel Jr. Bridge under construction, November 2004

Groundbreaking on the bridge occurred in 2001 in Mount Pleasant. The bridge was built as a design–build project, meaning that one contract was signed to both design and construct the bridge. This meant that construction could begin even while the design was not yet finalized. The bridge was built by a joint venture of two major construction firms operating under the name Palmetto Bridge Constructors. The joint venture partners were Tidewater Skanska of Norfolk, Virginia and Flatiron Constructors of Longmont, Colorado. The construction joint venture hired Parsons Brinckerhoff to complete the design. T.Y. Lin International provided design review and construction engineering and field inspection services. For the sake of simplifying labor and equipment resources, Palmetto Bridge Constructors actually managed the building of the bridge as five separate projects (the two highway interchanges at either end of the bridge, the two approach spans, and the cable-stayed span) going on simultaneously.

By the summer of 2002, the foundations for the towers and most of the piers were in place, and the rock islands were completed. The steel and concrete towers began to ascend from the islands soon after. Originally, each of the towers was to be topped with a 50-foot (15 m) multicolored LED "beacon", but public opinion caused this plan to be scrapped.

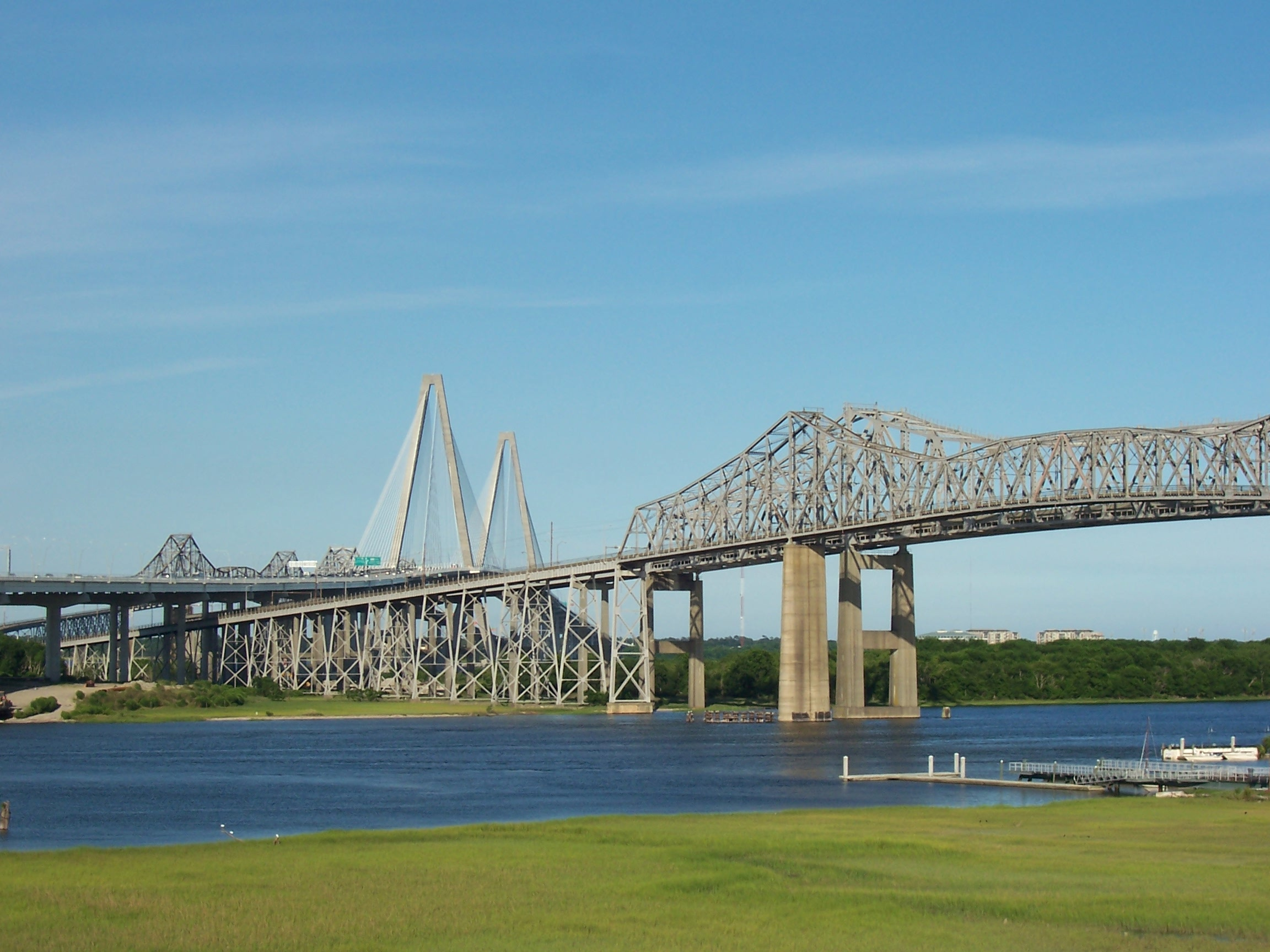
Arthur Ravenel Jr. Bridge with the old Cooper River Bridges

The fast-paced construction schedule led to contractors to use a self-climbing form system to build the towers. The formwork, supplied by PERI, provided a solution to meet the tight construction tolerances and provide safe access for workers laboring hundreds of feet in the air. The self-climbing system meant that the tower cranes did not have to spend time raising the forms after each segment of concrete hardened, and instead could be better used to haul material from barges below.

The first cables were hung from the towers in 2004—as a time-saving measure, this was done before the towers were wholly completed. Sections of the deck were built outward from each of the towers as more cables were hung.

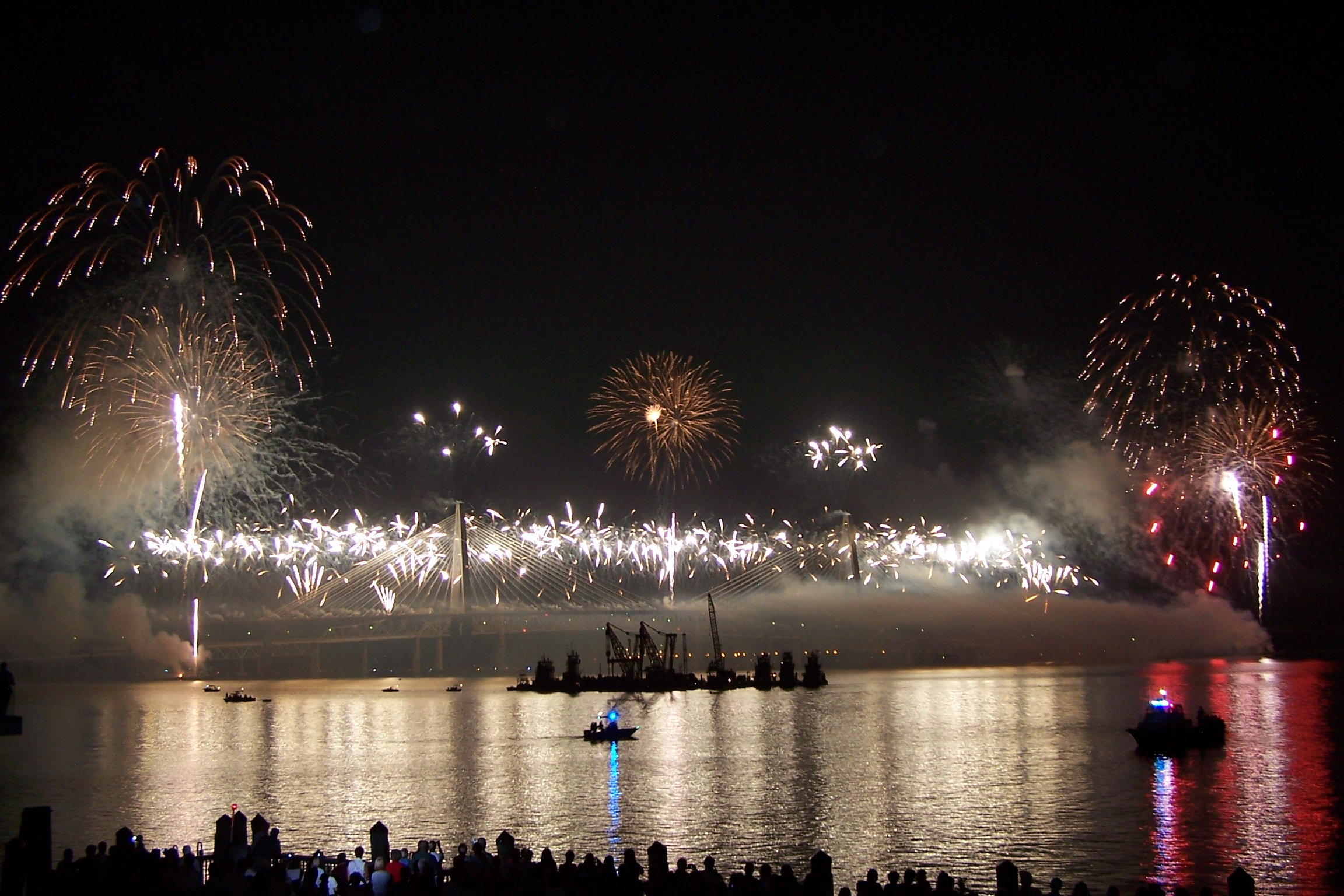
Fireworks celebration to precede the opening of the new bridge, July 2005

The decks of the approaches were taking shape as well. Construction of part of the roadway actually occurred over the top of the old cantilever bridges, which remained open to traffic without interruption.

A ceremony was held in March 2005, when the last slab of the deck was added, thus making the bridge "complete". But paving, installation of lights and signs, and cleanup meant that the bridge would not open for another four months.

Following a week-long celebration that included a public bridge walk, concerts, dinners, and fireworks, the bridge was dedicated and opened on July 16, 2005—one year ahead of schedule and under budget. The bridge was featured on the TV show Extreme Engineering.

== Bridge Run ==
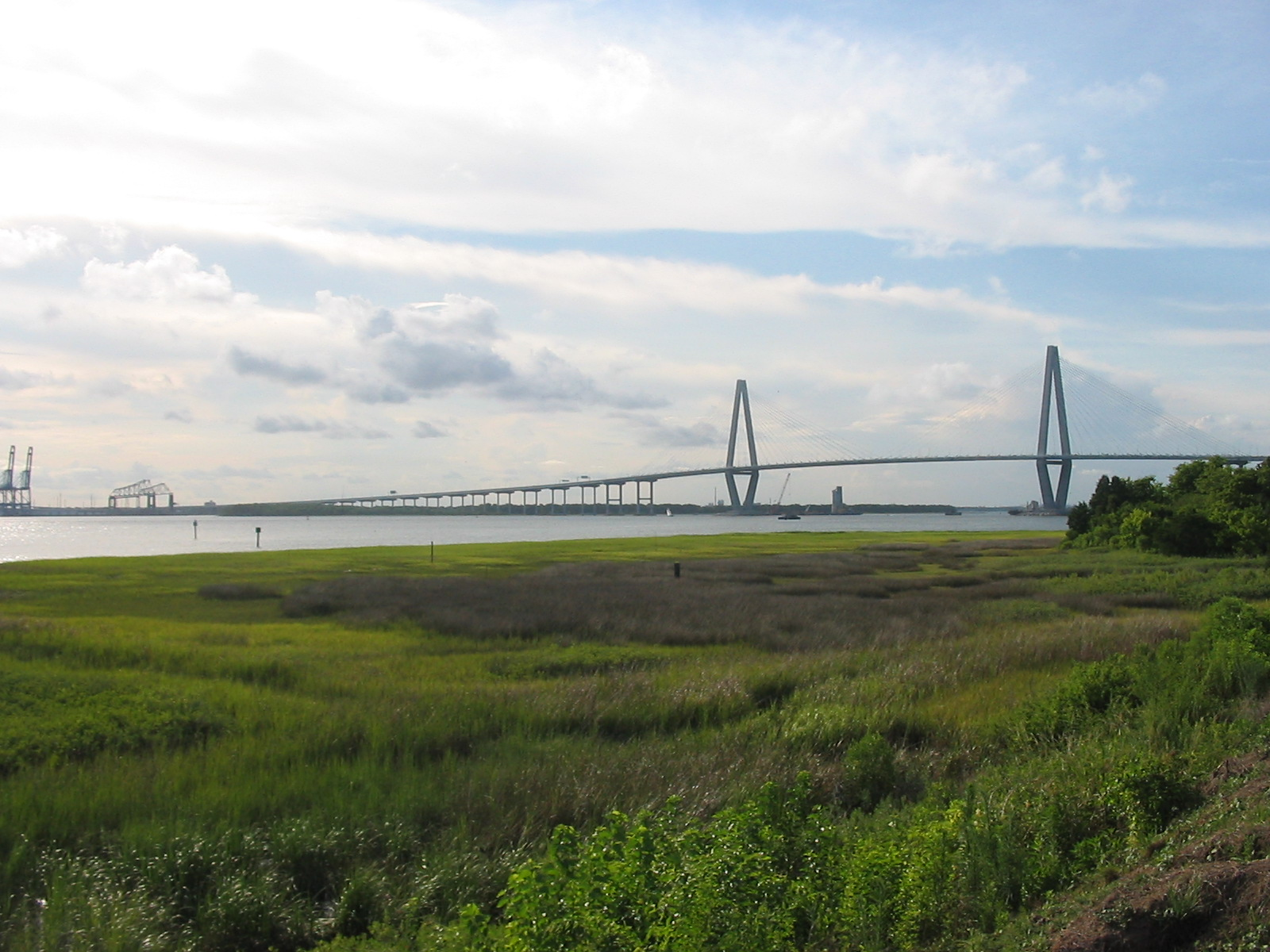
Arthur Ravenel Jr. Bridge view from Patriot's Point, July 2006. The last fragments of the two old bridges can be seen in the background.

The bridge is home to the annual USA Track & Field 10,000 metres (6.2 mi) Cooper River Bridge Run on the first weekend of April. This event attracts up to 50,000 people. The route starts in Mount Pleasant and finishes in downtown Charleston at Marion Square.

== In popular culture ==
In the 2008 video game Need for Speed Undercover, a bridge similar to the Ravenel Bridge was featured but only on the PlayStation 3, Xbox, and PC versions. It was also featured in the 2012 version of Need for Speed Most Wanted (but it only crosses half of the water).

The 2009 movie The New Daughter, starring Kevin Costner, features the Ravenel Bridge in several scenes, as the movie is based in and around Charleston, South Carolina.

The cover of Darius Rucker's 2010 album Charleston, SC 1966 features a picture of Rucker, a Charleston native, with the Ravenel Bridge in the background.

The 2014 television series Reckless features the bridge in its title sequence.
