= Thomas Porcher Stoney =

American politician

53rd Mayor of Charleston
- In office 1923–1931
- Preceded by: John P. Grace
- Succeeded by: Burnet R. Maybank

Personal details
- Born: December 16, 1889 Goose Creek, South Carolina, US
- Died: April 22, 1973 (aged 83)
- Spouse: Beverly Means DuBose
- Children: Theodore DuBose Stoney, Laurence O'Hear Stoney, Randell Croft Stoney
- Education: University of the South, Sewanee, TN; University of South Carolina School of Law (1911)

Thomas Porcher Stoney was the fifty-third mayor of Charleston, South Carolina, serving between 1923 and 1931.

Stoney was born at Medway Plantation on December 16, 1889, in rural Berkeley County, South Carolina to Samuel Stoney and Eliza Croft Stoney.

Stoney graduated from the University of South Carolina School of Law in 1911 and began a private law practice in Charleston, South Carolina. In 1915, he was elected solicitor (prosecutor) for the Ninth Judicial Circuit, the youngest solicitor elected at that time. He remained in that office until 1923 when he was elected mayor of Charleston.

Stoney encouraged Clelia Peronneau Mathewes McGowan to become one of the first women City Alderman in Charleston. He was re-elected in 1927 and completed that term. One of his major accomplishments as mayor was the creation of a municipal airport. His administration also oversaw the construction of recreational facilities; such as a golf course, a playground named for William Moultrie, and Johnson Hagood Stadium (then a municipal facility, but today the football stadium for The Citadel Bulldogs football team).

He ran for a United States Senate seat, but lost in the Democratic primary to James F. Byrnes in 1936 by a margin of about 10-to-1. During his life he swung across the political spectrum. He was a solid democrat in his early political life, but grew disaffected with the New Deal. In 1936 he gave a speech about the New Deal and said, "[A]ll of this spending is like giving a drunk some drinks to sober him up."

Stoney died on April 22, 1973, at the age of 83. He was struck while walking across a road. He is buried at Strawberry Chapel in Berkeley County, South Carolina.

Political offices
Preceded by John P. Grace	Mayor of Charleston, South Carolina; 1923–1931	Succeeded by Burnet R. Maybank
