= Albert Wheeler Todd =

American architect (1856–1924)

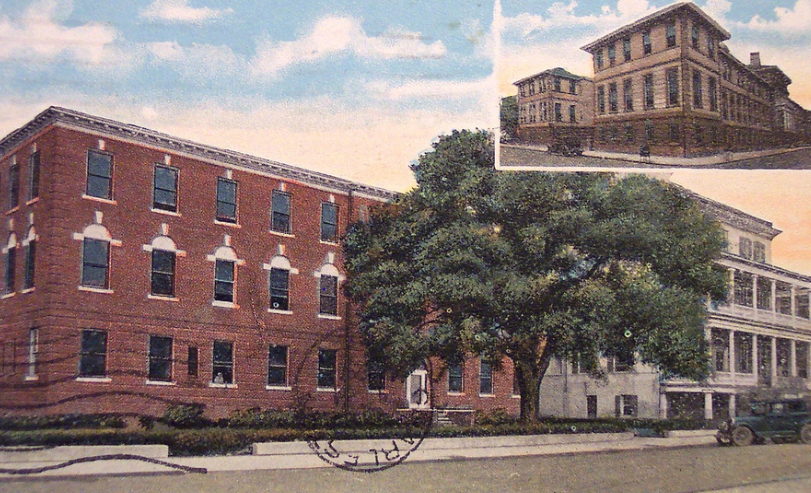
A postcard of the Thompson Memorial Infirmary (part of Roper Hospital), located at 316 Calhoun Street in Charleston, South Carolina. Later became Riverside Hospital

Albert Wheeler Todd (April 20, 1856 – December 30, 1924) was an architect in Charleston, South Carolina. He is known for his neoclassical architecture (Colonial Revival architecture), the design on his own home and of a home for Tristram Hyde. Todd was the senior partner at the firm of Todd & Benson which became Todd, Simons & Todd. Joseph F. Leitner worked with him. Todd also served in the legislature from 1910 until 1924 and was a State Senator.

Todd was born in Anderson, South Carolina. He practiced in Augusta, Georgia before relocating to Charleston in 1899.

Todd's firm Todd & Benson is credited with designing Academy of Our Lady of Mercy. He is credited with the remodel of a row of older buildings into the Commercial Club building (later converted into the Timrod Inn), and (with Albert Simmons) design of the Thompson Memorial Infirmary (later Riverside Hospital).

Todd died in Philadelphia, Pennsylvania on December 30, 1924. Todd had at least six grandchildren.

== Works ==
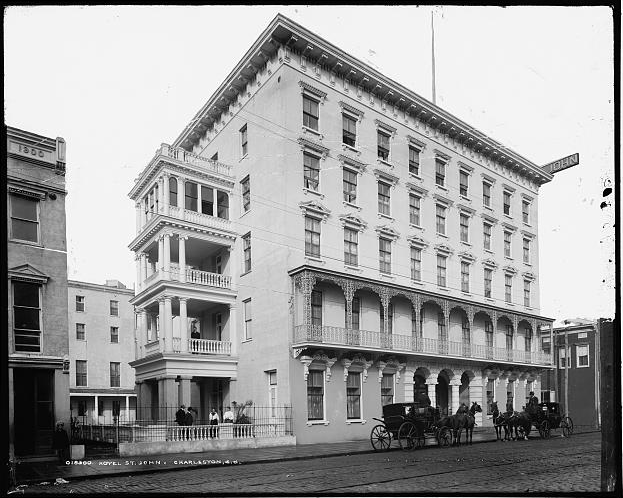
St. John Hotel at 115 Meeting Street in Charleston, South Carolina (shown in 1907)

- Grandstands for Charleston Athletic Association Park (velodrome) (1898), northwest corner of Meeting St. and Sheppard St., Charleston, SC.
- Charleston Consolidated Co. powerhouse (1899), upper Meeting Street, Charleston, SC.
- Charleston Commercial Club, 101 Meeting Street, Charleston (1902). The Commercial Club became the Timrod Inn (later known as the Hotel Timrod), but it closed in 1955 and was demolished in 1964 for the building of the O. T. Wallace County Office Building.
- 40 Rutledge Ave., Charleston (1903), the first frame stucco construction in Charleston, with wood features added from salvage of the Belvedere Plantation. It was operated as the Belvedere B&B.
- Charleston Port Society building, Charleston, SC (1904). Todd drew plans for a building to replace the existing facility at North Market St. and East Bay St., but the Society does not appear to have ever executed the plans.
- St. John Hotel, 115 Meeting St., Charleston, SC (1904). Todd designed the sunroom and three-story piazza added to the hotel during a 1904 renovation. The hotel was razed in the 1960s and replaced with a facsimile now known as the Mills House Hotel at 115 Meeting St., Charleston, South Carolina.
- Memminger School, domestic science building, 20 Beaufain St., Charleston, SC (1908). The addition was a two-story brick building designed by Todd & Benson.
- Albert W. Todd House (1909), 41 Church St., Charleston, SC
- Academy of Our Lady of Mercy, 0 North Hampstead Sq., Charleston, SC (1912). The firm of Todd & Benson designed the two-story brick church with white "facings" for the Hampton Square Methodist Episcopal Church. The first floor was used for a Sunday School accommodating 500 children, and the second floor was constructed as a place of worship.
- Bennett School (remodel), 61 George St., Charleston, SC (1910). The firm of Todd & Benson thoroughly remodeled the existing building at the Bennett School. The work included adding a stair hall and new roof, but otherwise the work was largely confined to the interior layout and mechanicals.
- Industrial Training School, 207 President St., Charleston, SC (1910). The school was a design by Todd & Benson.
- Waring House, 25 Lamboll St., Charleston, SC (1912). The firm of Todd & Benson designed the neoclassical home for Thomas R. Waring, editor of the Evening Post (Charleston).
- Medical University of South Carolina, 69 Barre St., Charleston, SC (1913), main building
- Tristram Hyde House (1914), 74 Murray Blvd., Charleston, SC. In 1915 Hyde was elected for the first of two terms as mayor of Charleston.
- Various Citadel buildings
- Town Hall, Sullivan's Island
- 41 Meeting St., Charleston, SC
- Thompson Memorial Infirmary (later Riverside Hospital), with Albert Simmons

== Gallery ==
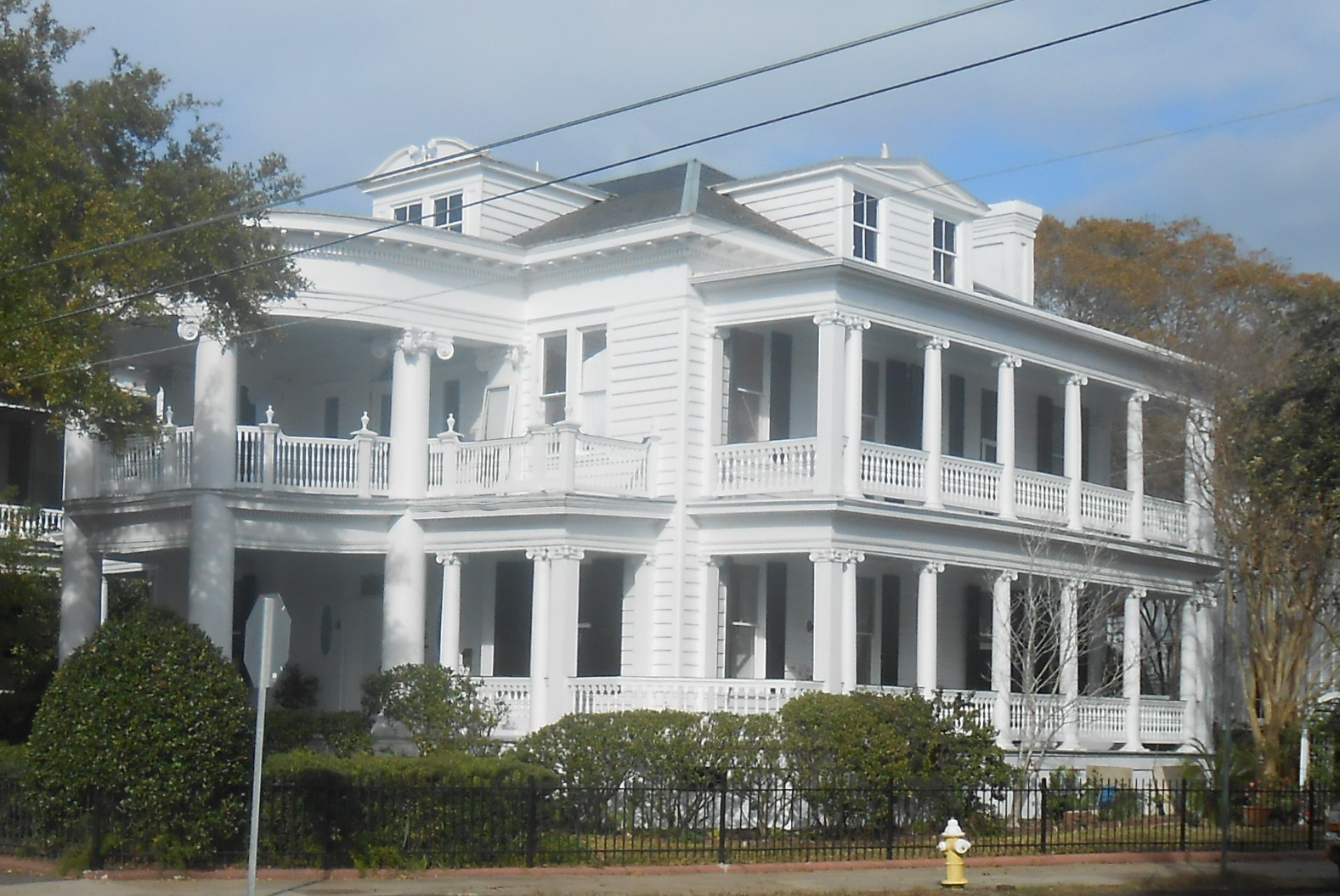
40 Rutledge Ave., Charleston, SC

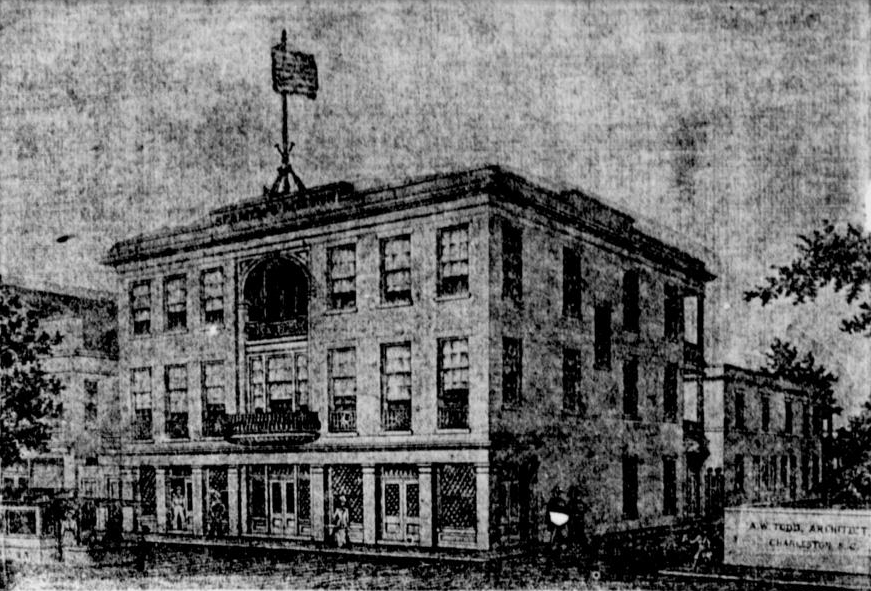
Charleston, SC (unbuilt) (shown in rendering from 1904)

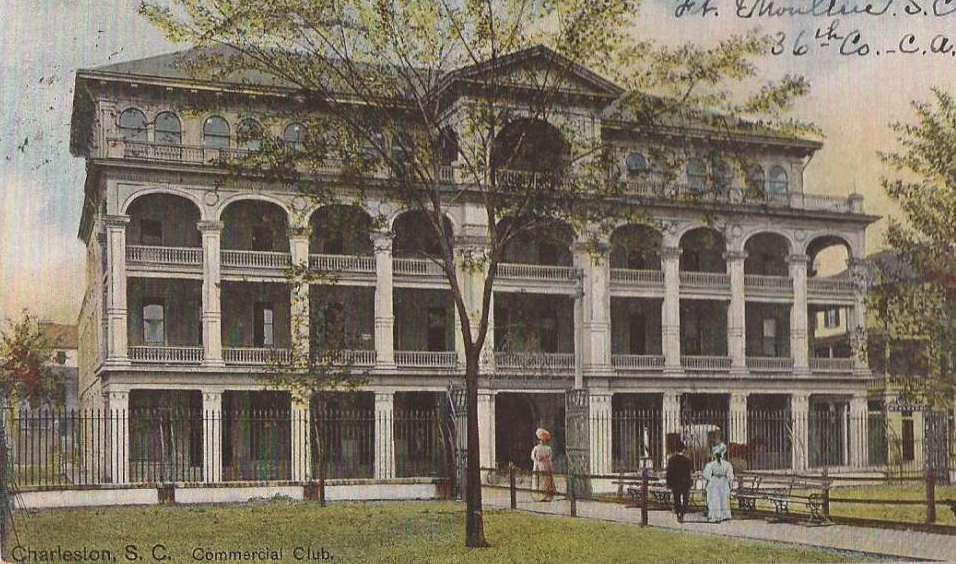
Postcard of 101 Meeting St., Charleston, SC (shown in 1907)

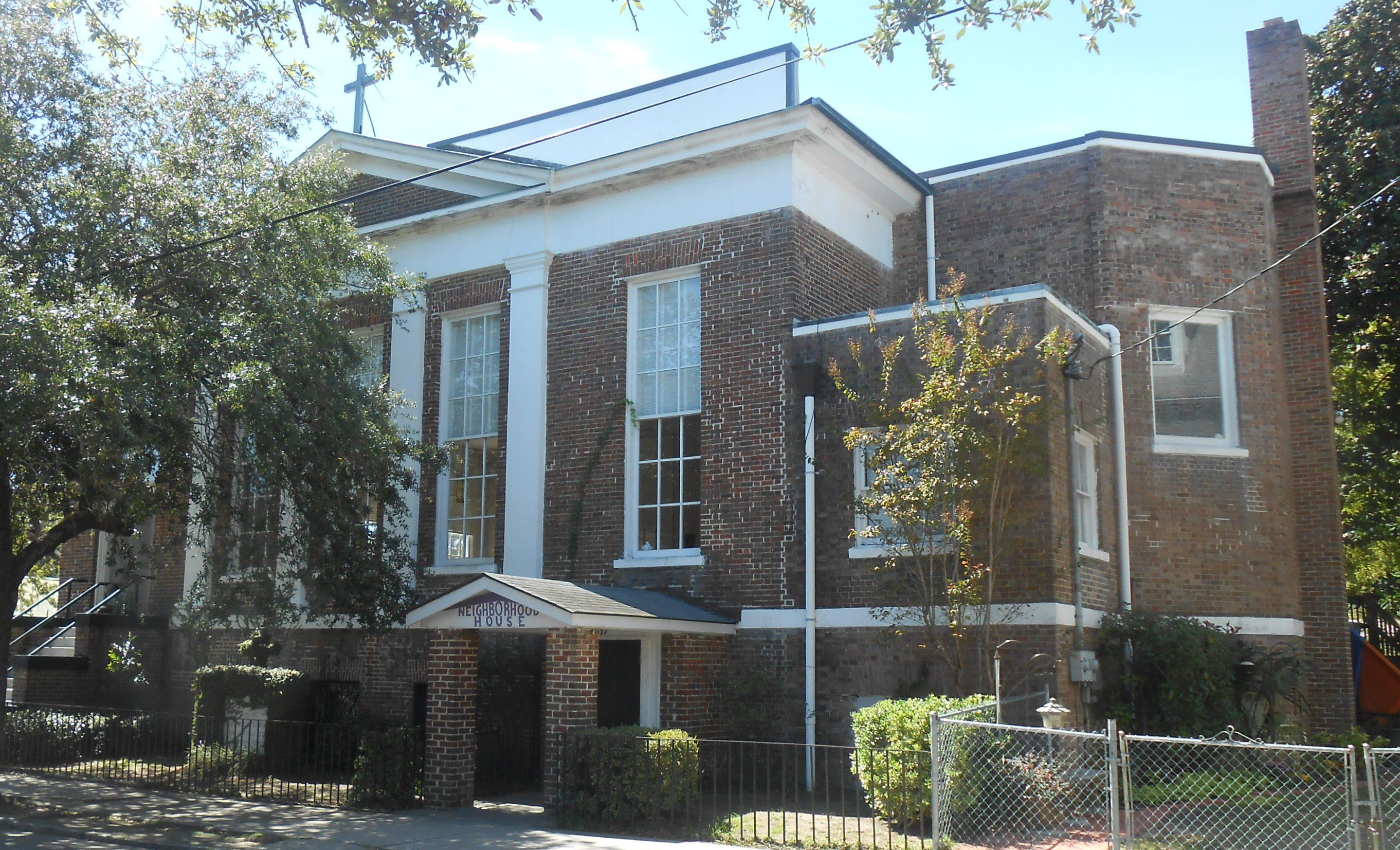
Academy of Our Lady of Mercy, 0 North Hampstead Sq., Charleston, SC

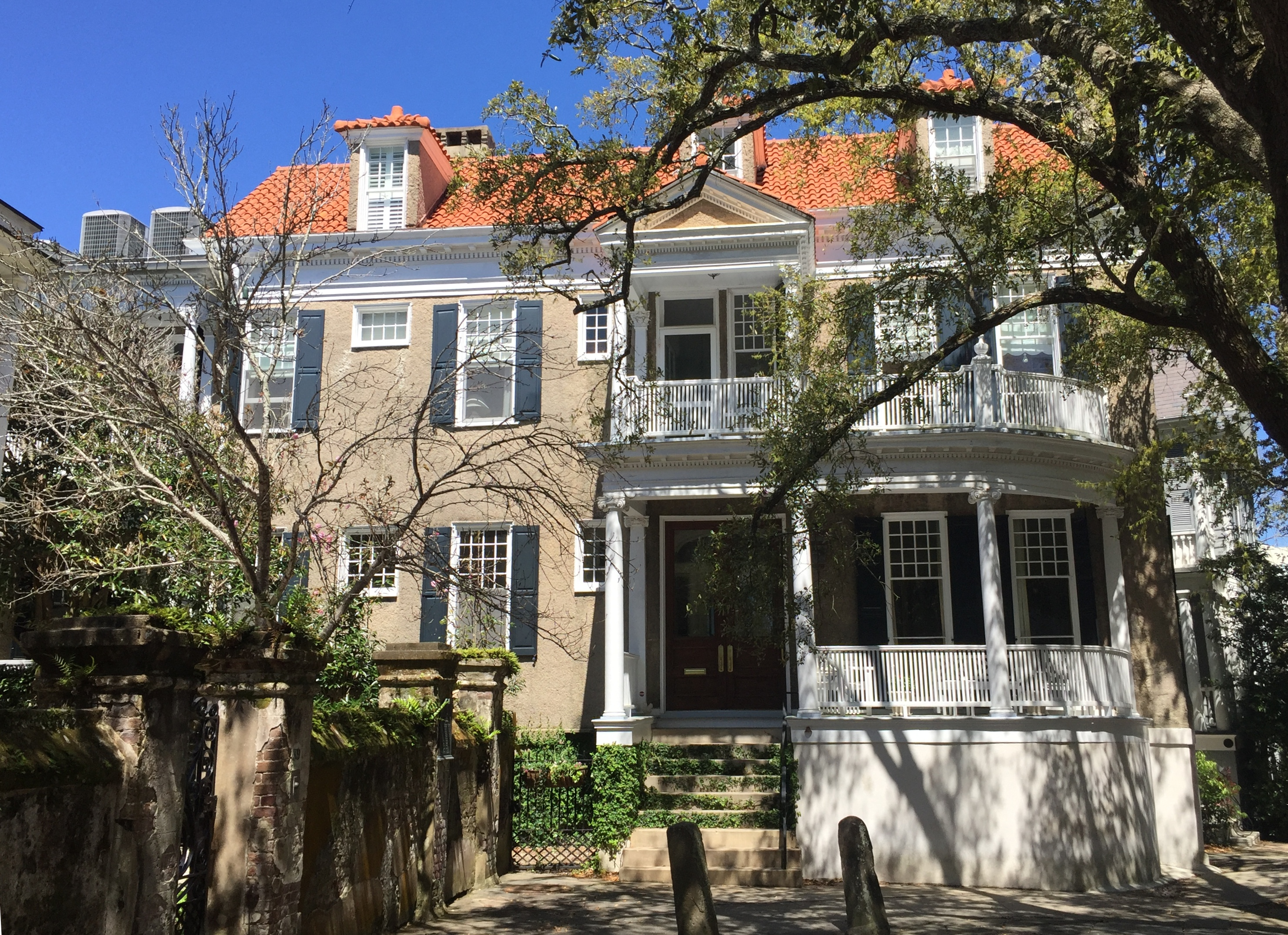
Albert W. Todd House at 41 Church St., Charleston, SC

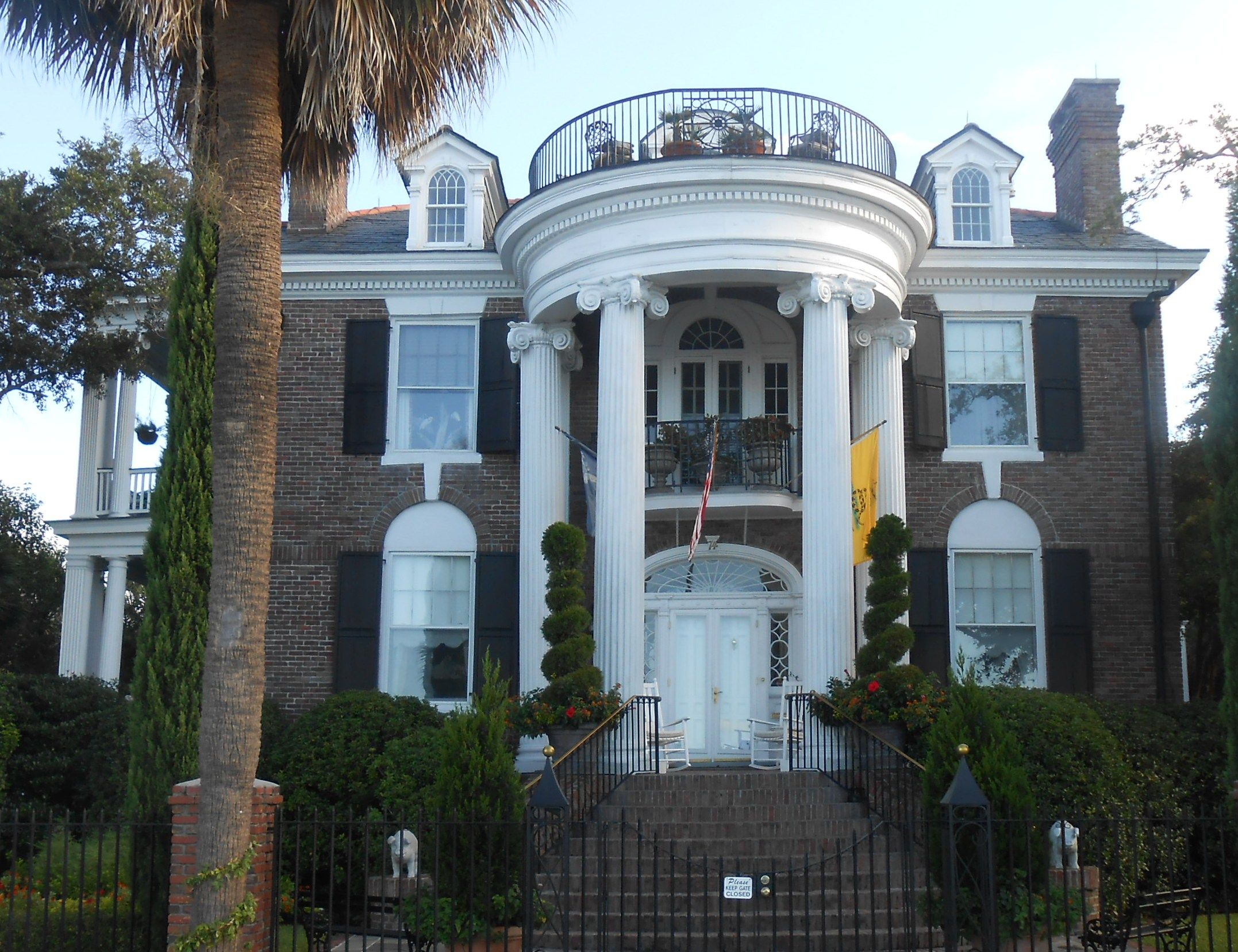
Tristram Hyde House at 74 Murray Blvd., Charleston, SC

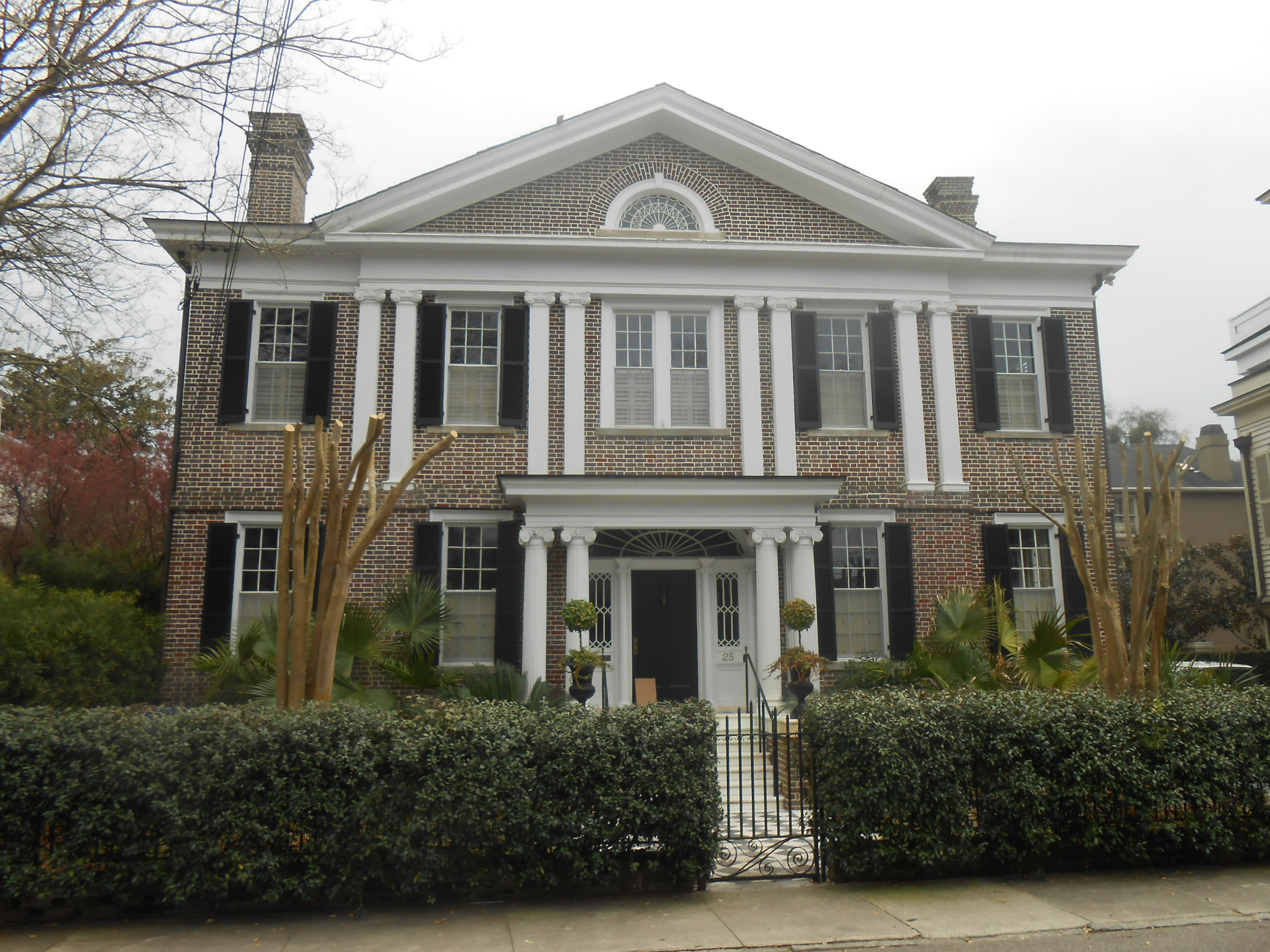
Thomas Waring House at 25 Lamboll St., Charleston, SC

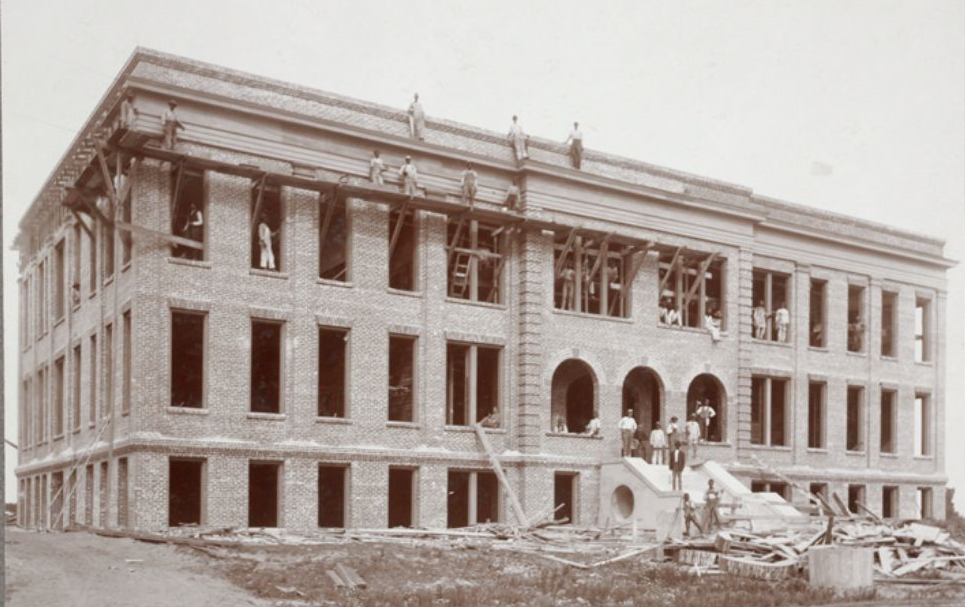
The Industrial Training School of Charleston, SC (shown under construction in 1910)

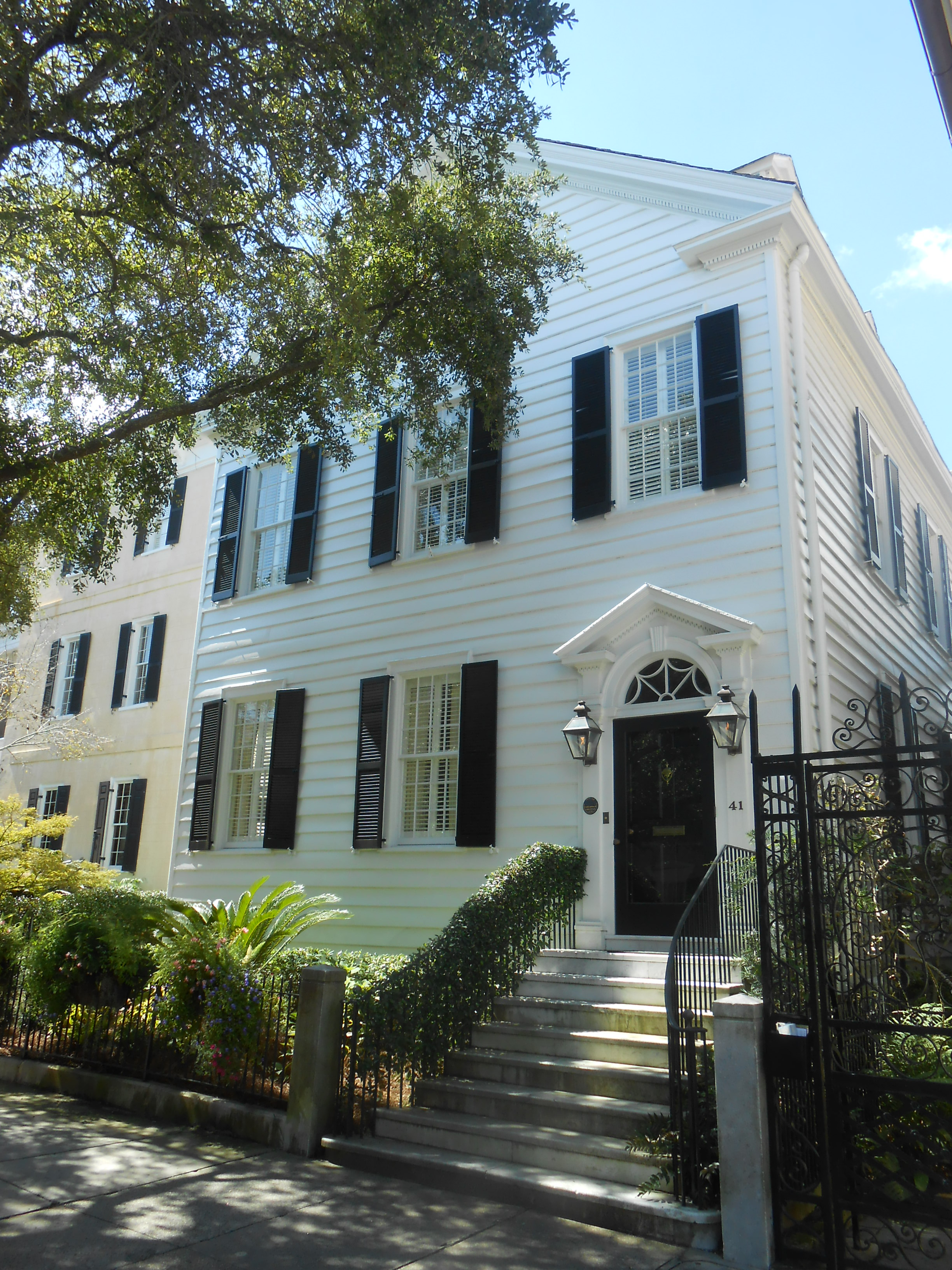
41 Meeting St., Charleston, SC
