= Clelia Peronneau McGowan =

Clelia Peronneau Mathewes McGowan (January 30, 1865 – August 13, 1956) was an American activist and politician from South Carolina. In December, 1923, she and Belizant A. Moorer became the first women elected to the position of Alderman in Charleston, South Carolina.

Governor Robert Archer Cooper appointed her to the South Carolina State Board of Education in 1920, the first appointment of a woman to public office in South Carolina. In 1923, she was elected to serve as Alderman under newly elected Charleston Mayor Thomas Porcher Stoney.

In her role as Alderman, McGowan worked to successfully create the first public playgrounds for Black children in Charleston. This came partially from her work with the Southern Commission of Interracial Cooperation.
