= Tristram Hyde House =

Coordinates: 32.77151°N 79.93972°W

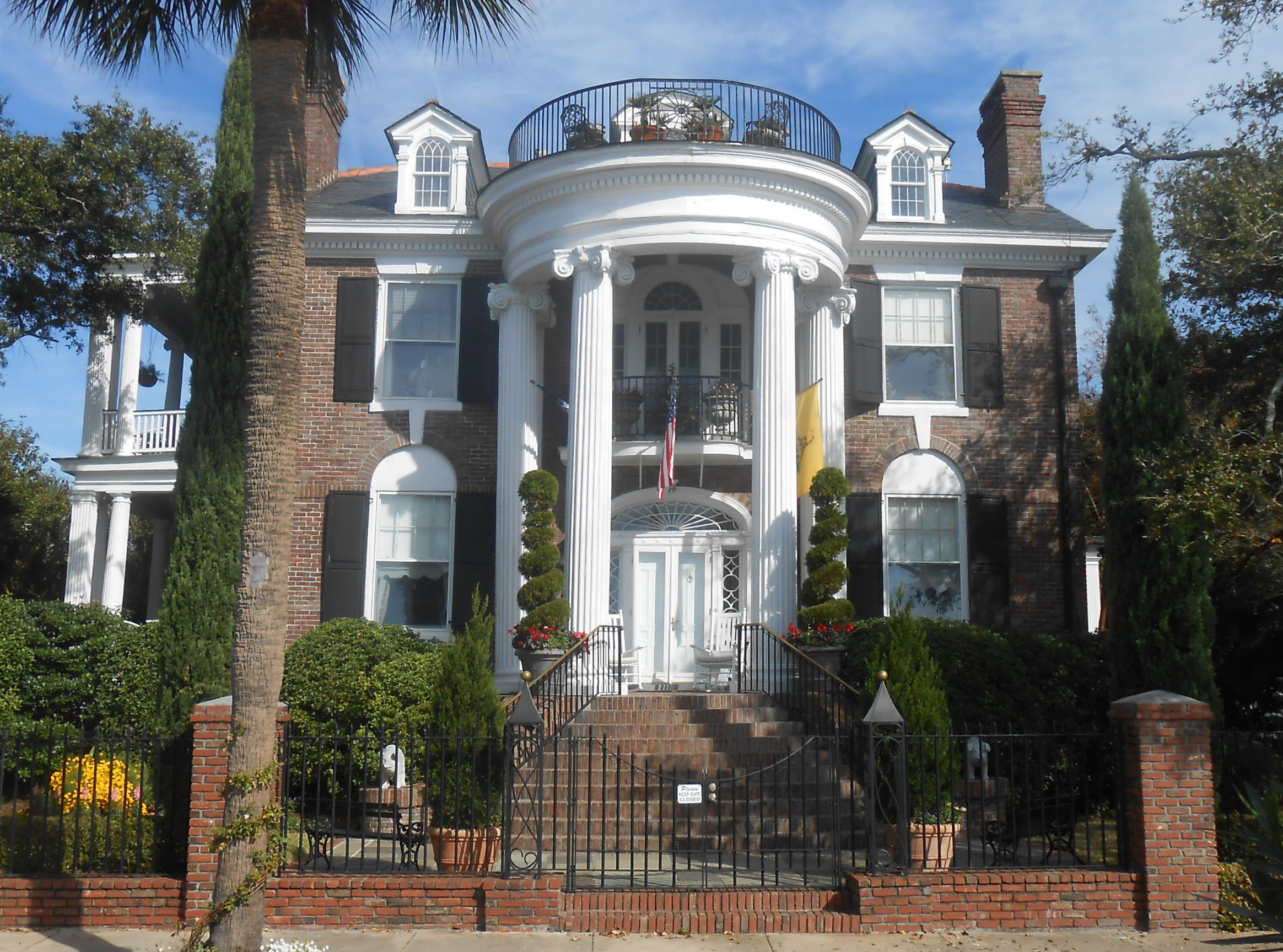
Tristam Hyde House at 74 Murray Blvd. in Charleston, South Carolina

Tristram Hyde House is a historic two-story home in Charleston, South Carolina constructed in 1914 for Tristram Hyde, who soon after became mayor of Charleston in 1915. It was designed by local architect Albert Wheeler Todd.

Designed in a Neoclassical Revival architecture style, the residence includes two-story Ionic columned portico. The features are also described as being Federal Style architecture, including a front entry bordered by trimmed fanlight and sidelights.
