= John P. Grace =

American politician

John Patrick Grace
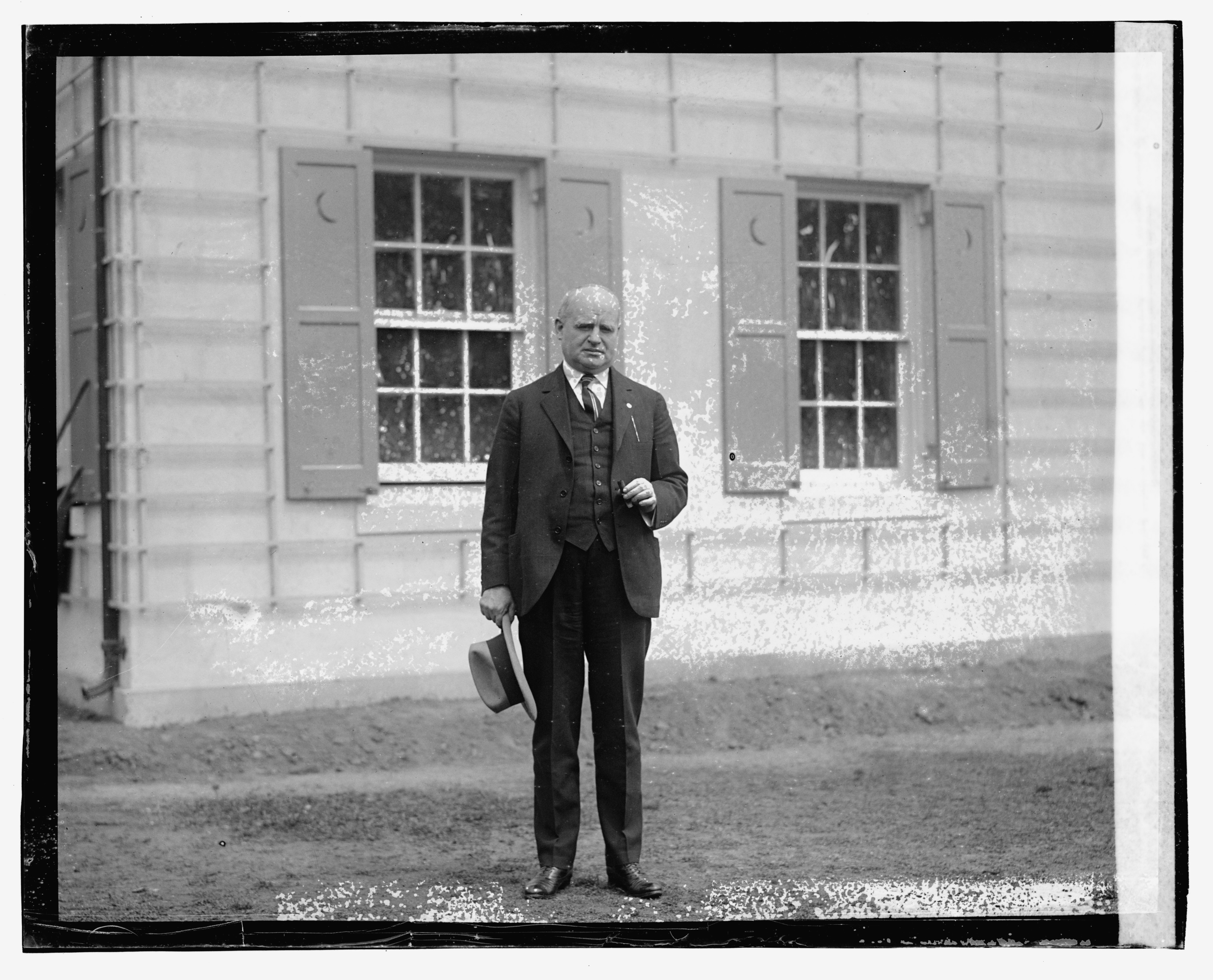

51st Mayor of Charleston
- In office 1911–1915
- Preceded by: R. Goodwyn Rhett
- Succeeded by: Tristram T. Hyde
- In office 1919–1923
- Preceded by: Tristram T. Hyde
- Succeeded by: Thomas Porcher Stoney

Personal details
- Born: December 30, 1874 Charleston, South Carolina
- Died: June 25, 1940 (aged 65) Charleston, South Carolina
- Party: Democratic
- Spouse: Ella Barkley Sullivan
- Education: Georgetown University
- Profession: Lawyer, newspaper publisher

John P. Grace (1874-1940) was the fifty-first mayor of Charleston, South Carolina, completing two, nonconsecutive terms from 1911 to 1915 and then 1919 to 1923.

Among his administrations' achievements were an extensive street paving program and the construction of the John P. Grace Memorial Bridge, which was dedicated to him.

== Early life and career ==
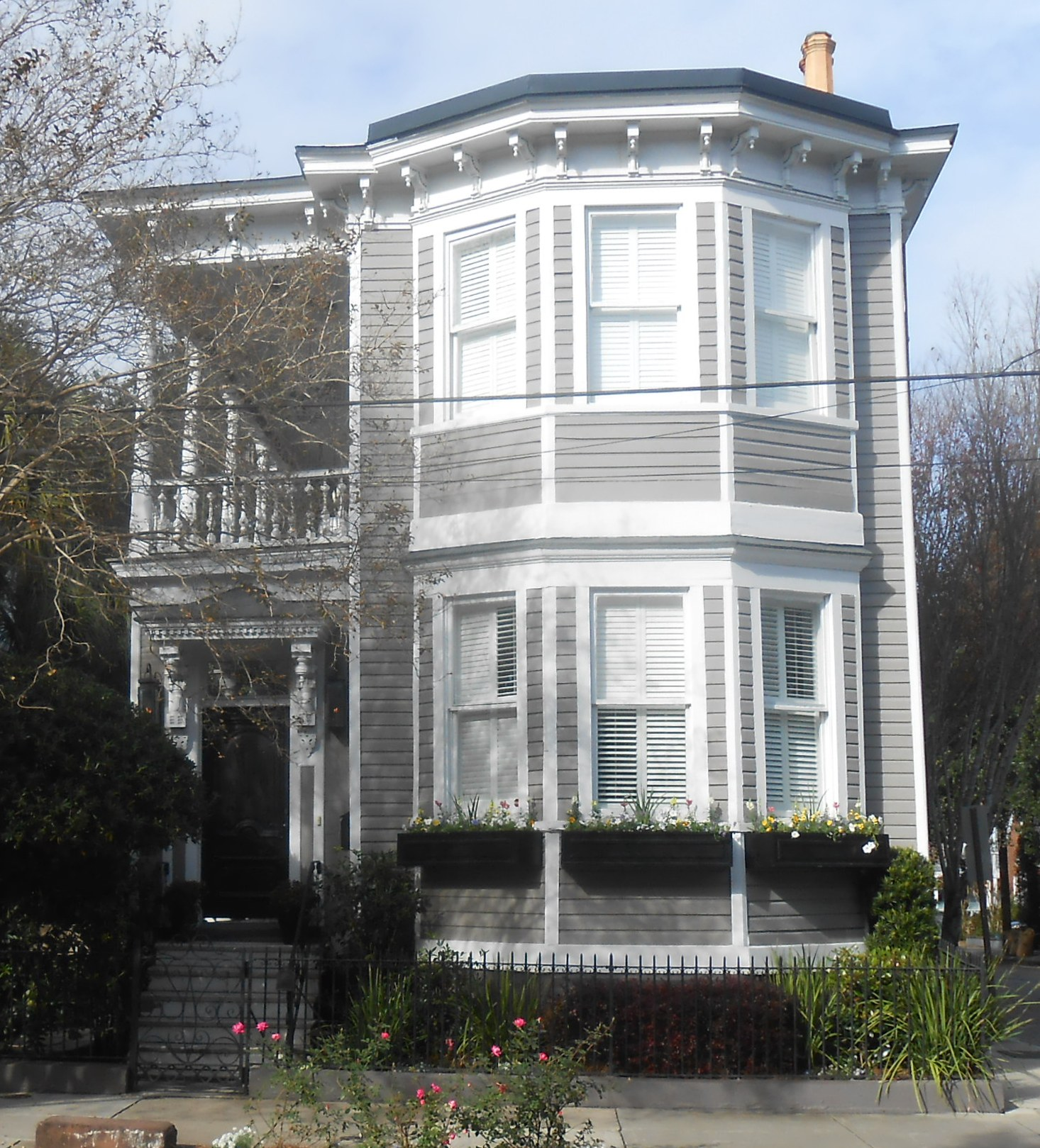
John P. Grace died at his home at 174 Broad Street on June 25, 1940.

Grace was born on December 30, 1874, in Charleston to James I. Grace and Elizabeth Daly Grace. His father died when Grace was still a child, and he helped support his family by carrying milk deliveries from a cow that his mother kept. Ironically, one of Grace's accomplishments was the outlawing of cows in the city for sanitary reasons. Grace left high school to start his own business. He was hired by William Elliott, the U.S. representative for Grace's district, and worked in Washington, during which time he studied law at Georgetown University. he returned to Charleston and started a law practice in 1902. He ran for the South Carolina Senate in 1902 but lost and lost again in 1904 when he ran for county sheriff and again in 1908 in a race for the United States Senate.

== Mayor of Charleston (1911-1915, 1919-1923) ==
Grace ran for mayor of Charleston in 1911 against Tristram T. Hyde, winning by a small margin. However, In 1915, Hyde, supported by wealthy business interests ousted him. Three days after the election, an election recount was held on the southwest corner of King St. and George St. which resulted in the shooting death of a News and Courier reporter, Sidney J. Cohen. Grace conceded the election shortly afterwards.

In the 1919 race, Grace again ran against Hyde. Although the outcome showed Hyde with a one-vote lead, after challenges, the Democratic Executive Committee declared Grace the winner. His opponents began running a series of advertisements attacking Grace, taking advantage of pro-German sentiments he had expressed as the editor of a local paper, The Charleston American. Indeed, because of his views, he was threatened with the loss of mailing privileges for his newspaper if he did not stop his strong editorials. Grace ended his editorship but continued to direct the operation of the newspaper. In 1923, Grace lost his bid for re-election.

His most lasting accomplishment was the construction of the John P. Grace Memorial Bridge, which spanned the Cooper River to connect Charleston and Mt. Pleasant to replace a ferry system had been used. He suggested the bridge in 1927, and it opened in 1929. It was later replaced by the Arthur Ravenel Jr. Bridge.

== Later life ==
Grace died at his home at 174 Broad Street, Charleston, South Carolina.

Political offices
Preceded by R. Goodwyn Rhett	Mayor of Charleston, South Carolina; 1911–1915	Succeeded by Tristram T. Hyde
Preceded by Tristram T. Hyde	Mayor of Charleston, South Carolina; 1919–1923	Succeeded by Thomas Porcher Stoney
