= Fort Sumter Hotel =

Condominium building in Charleston, South Carolina

Coordinates: 32.788766°N 79.938071°W

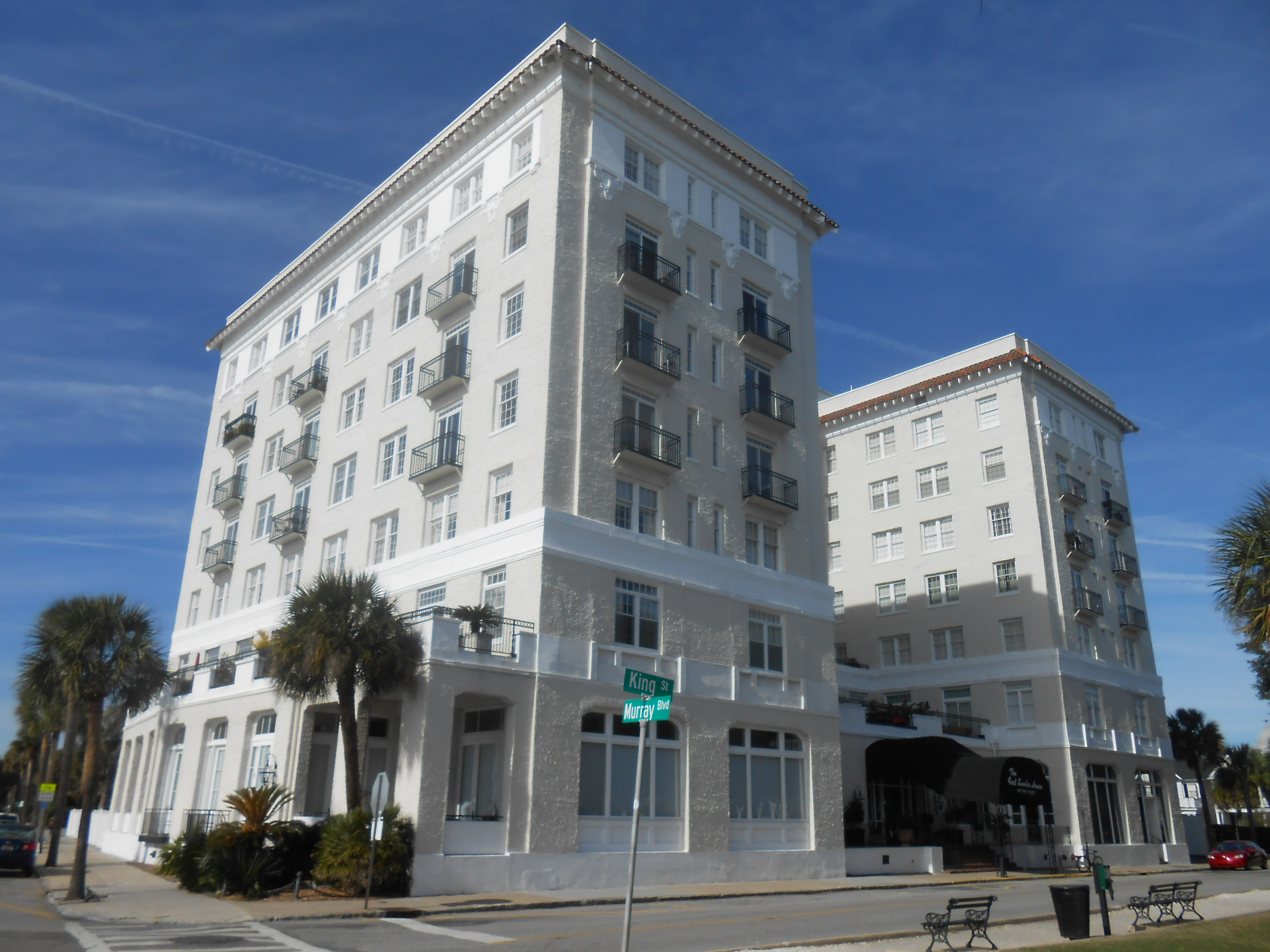
The Fort Sumter Hotel (now condos) at 1 King St., Charleston, South Carolina

The Fort Sumter House is a seven-story condominium building located at 1 King St., Charleston, South Carolina, originally built as the Fort Sumter Hotel. Work began on April 1, 1923, and guests were accepted starting in April 1924, but the formal opening was on May 6, 1924. The hotel cost $850,000 to build. The 225-room hotel was designed by G. Lloyd Preacher of Atlanta, Georgia.

The hotel was the site of a tryst between John F. Kennedy and a Danish woman with connection to the Nazis. On February 6, 1942, just after Kennedy arrived in Charleston for service with naval intelligence, he spent three nights at the Fort Sumter Hotel with a former Miss Denmark, Inga Arvad. The FBI was monitoring Arvad and taped the encounters. The information was then passed to Kennedy's father, Joseph Kennedy, who, in an effort to separate his son from Arvad, had him reassigned to a PT boat in the Pacific, the now famous PT-109. John F. Kennedy remarked, "They shipped my ass out of town to break us up."

Starting on July 22, 1942, the hotel was used as the headquarters for the sixth naval district for $80,000 per year.

It was refurbished and reopened as a hotel in 1946.

In April 1947, Tennessee Williams and agent Audrey Wood met with Irene Selznick at the Fort Sumter Hotel to discuss her producing his newest play A Streetcar Named Desire (just recently renamed from the original title Poker Night). Tennessee Williams: Mad Pilgrimage of the Flesh by John Lahr, 2014, p. 127.

In 1956, the hotel considered an expansion of 60 to 100 rooms to accommodate the increase in convention business seen in Charleston.

The hotel was sold to Sheraton Hotels in 1967 for $435,000. The chain spent a further $500,000 on renovations and renamed the property the Sheraton-Fort Sumter Hotel. Sheraton sold the hotel to a group of local investors in 1973 for $850,000. They closed the hotel and spent $2 million converting the 225-room hotel into a 67-unit condominium complex. The condo units were expected to sell from $36,000 to $120,000 for a penthouse unit. The addition of the penthouse units resulted in the creation of an eighth floor, but the change was barely noticeable from outside since it was done by reworking the roof of the building.
