= R. Goodwyn Rhett =

American politician

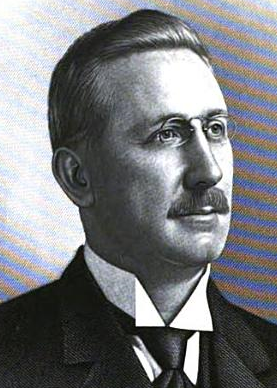

50th Mayor of Charleston
- In office 1903–1911
- Preceded by: James Adger Smyth
- Succeeded by: John P. Grace

Personal details
- Born: Robert Goodwyn Rhett; March 25, 1862 Columbia, South Carolina
- Died: April 16, 1939 (aged 77) Charleston, South Carolina
- Party: Democrat
- Spouses: Helen Smith Whaley (m. 1888; died 1904) Blanche Salley (m. 1906)
- Children: 5
- Education: University of Virginia (M.A. in 1883; LLB in 1884)
- Profession: Lawyer, bank president

Robert Goodwyn Rhett (1862–1939) was the 50th mayor of Charleston, South Carolina, completing two terms from 1903 to 1911. From 1916 to 1918, he served as president of the Chamber of Commerce of the United States.

== History ==
Robert Goodwyn Rhett was born in Columbia, South Carolina in 1862 to Albert Moore and Martha Goodwyn Rhett. He grew up in Charleston where his father was a pioneer in fertilizer manufacturing, following the discovery of phosphate rocks near Charleston in the 1860s. After attending the Porter Military Academy and Episcopal High School in Alexandria, Virginia, he entered the University of Virginia in 1879 and graduated in 1883 with a Master of Arts. The following year he earned his law degree and returned to practice law in Charleston where, in 1886, he formed the partnership with George Macbeth Trenholm (1859 - 1902). He played baseball while at the University of Virginia, and upon his return, was the first pitcher known to throw a curve ball in South Carolina.

Outside of his law practice, Rhett actively participated in the phosphate industry, constructing factories and assuming leadership roles until ownership consolidated into the Virginia-Carolina Chemical Company. He also became active in the banking industry. In 1896, he was elected president of the South Carolina Loan and Trust Company. In 1899, he acquired a controlling interest in the Peoples National Bank of Charleston, at the time the oldest national bank in Charleston. By his second term as major, Rhett had served on the Board of Directors for at least 25 separate Charleston companies and had been president of eight building and loan organizations. He also largely responsible for the establishment of the Commercial Club of Charleston in 1902, and became its first president.

Rhett began his political career as an Alderman on the City Council of Charleston in 1895, a position he held until his election as mayor in 1903. As City Alderman he served on the committees of Ways and Means, Contracts, and Railroads, as well as the Board of Equalization. In 1902, he served as delegate at large to the 1902 Democratic national convention in St. Louis, Missouri. Significant accomplishments during his service as Alderman was the selection and approval of the Charleston Navy Yard and the installation of facilities for the Charleston Light and Water company.

On December 8, 1903, he was elected to become the fiftieth mayor of Charleston, South Carolina, and then re-elected on December 8, 1907. During Rhett’s tenure as mayor (1903-1911), he was responsible for the establishment of the Board of Public Works, the construction of new police and fire stations, and the expansion of the city through landfill along the southwest edge of the peninsula. Rhett also played an instrumental role in the establishment of Roper Hospital, Union Station, and Julian Mitchell Elementary School. A portrait of Rhett was dedicated during his final meeting of city council.

Rhett continued in political service, later becoming the president of the Chamber of Commerce of the United States in 1916–1918 and serving as the chairman of the South Carolina Highway Commission in 1920–1926.

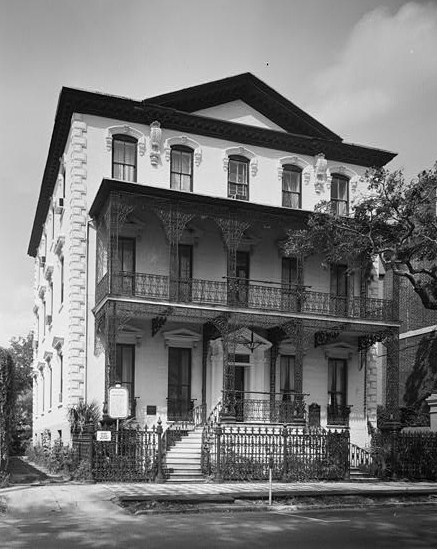
At the time of his death, he lived in the John Rutledge House on Broad Street, Charleston, South Carolina.

== Personal life and death ==
On November 15, 1888. Rhett married Helen Smith Whaley, daughter of William B. and Helen Smith Whaley, of Charleston. Together, they had four children, Helen Whaley, Margaret Goodwyn, William Whaley (died in infancy) and Robert Goodwyn Jr. After his first wife died in April 1904, he married Blanche Salley, the daughter of D. Hammond and Ida Prothro Salley, of Aiken County, South Carolina, on August 8, 1906. Of this union there were two children, Blanche and Albert (known as "Boots").

In 1902, he purchased the historic John Rutledge House, and lived there until his death.

Rhett died on April 16, 1939, and was buried at Magnolia Cemetery.

Political offices
Preceded by James Adger Smyth	Mayor of Charleston, South Carolina; 1903–1911	Succeeded by John P. Grace
