= Cooper River Bridges (1929–2005) =

Former bridge in South Carolina, United States

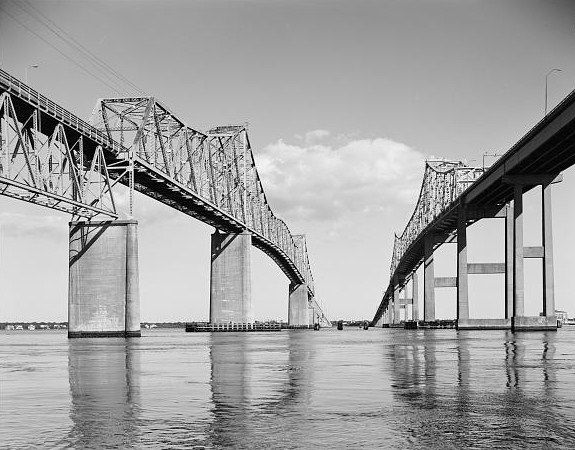
- The Grace Memorial Bridge (left) and the Pearman Bridge (right)
- Coordinates: 32°48′7.47″N 79°55′52.73″W
- Carries: 3 southbound lanes and 2 northbound lanes of US 17
- Crosses: Cooper River and Town Creek
- Locale: Charleston, SC
- Official name: John P. Grace Memorial Bridge (Southbound span); Silas N. Pearman Bridge (hybrid span)
- Maintained by: Cooper River Bridge, Inc (prior to 1941), SCDOT

Characteristics
- Design: Cantilever truss with suspended center span
- Total length: 2.7 miles (4.3 km) (1,050 feet (320 m))
- Width: 20 feet (6.1 m) (Two 10-foot (3.0 m) lanes; Grace Bridge); 40 ft (12 m) (Three 12-foot (3.7 m) lanes; Pearman Bridge)
- Height: 250 feet (76 m)
- Longest span: 760 ft (232 m)
- Load limit: 5 short tons (4.5 t)) (Grace Memorial Bridge)
- Clearance above: Unlimited
- Clearance below: 155 ft (47 m)

History
- Construction start: February 7, 1928; 98 years ago May 2, 1963; 63 years ago
- Construction end: July 8, 1929; 97 years ago April 29, 1966; 60 years ago
- Opened: July 8, 1929; 97 years ago (Grace Bridge); April 29, 1966; 60 years ago (Pearman Bridge)
- Closed: July 16, 2005; 21 years ago

Statistics
- Daily traffic: 35,000
- Toll: $0.50 per vehicle and driver and $0.15 for each additional passenger (abolished in 1946)

Location
- Interactive map of Cooper River Bridges

The Cooper River Bridges were a pair of cantilever truss bridges that carried traffic over the Cooper River in Charleston, South Carolina, United States. The first bridge opened in 1929, a second one opened in 1966 to relieve traffic congestion. The Grace Memorial Bridge was designed and constructed by a private company known as Cooper River Bridge, Inc, and the Pearman Bridge was designed by HNTB Corporation and constructed by SCDOT. The bridges were replaced with the Arthur Ravenel Jr. Bridge in 2005.

== Design ==
A diagram of the Grace Bridge's truss, as documented by its HAER file.

The Grace Memorial Bridge carried two narrow 10-foot (3.0 m) lanes. The mainspan of the second cantilever was the twelfth-longest in the world. The total length of the structure was about 2.7 miles (4.3 km). Following a 17-month construction at a cost of $6 million, it opened with a three-day celebration that attracted visitors from around the globe. Engineers and critics proclaimed colorful descriptions of the unique structure, deeming it "the first roller-coaster bridge" and citing that "steep approaches, stupendous height, extremely narrow width, and a sharp curve at the dip conspire to excite and alarm the motorist."

The Pearman Bridge consisted of three wide lanes to carry traffic, two carrying US 17 northbound traffic and one lane that carried Southbound traffic. In this manner, the reversible lane could be used in the direction of heavy traffic in the mornings and evenings as Mount Pleasant was effectively a bedroom community at the time. One lane was originally reversible, which led to signs warning "Use lanes with green arrow" and "Do not use red X lane".

== History ==
A group of businessmen, led by Harry F. Barkerding and Charles R. Allen, announced their plans to get a charter from the state to construct a steel bridge across the Cooper River in June 1926. While some citizens, including Charleston Mayor Thomas Stoney, feared a bridge would mar the Charleston skyline, many recognized a real need. The first model drafted was much like the one Sottile had proposed, except it was designed for cars instead of a railroad. The same objections from the shipping industry were raised, so the next plan actually called for a tunnel-bridge combination—to start at the Charleston waterfront, go under the shipping channel, emerge at Castle Pinckney and then continue over the water to what is now Patriot's Point. It was later discovered to be cost-prohibitive. The group formed the Cooper River Bridge, Inc., on June 7, 1926, with Ashmead F. Pringle as the first president. On June 8, 1926, the state issued a charter to the new company to "buy, rent, lease, build or otherwise acquire bridges across streams both intrastate and interstate, together with rights of way and right to construct and own and operate the same, and to charge tolls for passage across and enter upon such bridges, etc."." It was built by a consortium of four engineering and construction firms. Construction lasted seventeen months, and the final cost of the bridge was six million dollars. The bridge's ribbon cutting ceremony was started on August 8, 1929, at 1:12 p.m. by Col. James Armstrong. Between 30,000 and 50,000 people crossed the bridge during its first day. The bridge was owned by Cooper River Bridge, Inc., a private company. The bridge was designated as the Cooper River Bridge. The bridge had cost $6 million to build, and had two 10 ft (3.0 m) lanes. After four hours of free service, a toll was implemented, fifty cents per car and driver, plus fifteen cents per additional passenger. In 1929, South Carolina Highway 40 was routed over the bridge.

Funds to pay off bonded indebtedness were expected to come from tolls, but after only six weeks of service, the bridge was in danger as not enough travelers were using the bridge to avoid doing so. As a result, it was offered for sale for delinquent taxes on September 20, 1929. However, a 100-mile strip of Route 40 was paved near Georgetown on October 1, 1929 and saved the bridge from sale.

In 1931, US 701 was routed over the bridge, creating a concurrency. By 1933, the South Carolina Highway 40 designation was removed from the bridge.

The bridge floundered from an economic perspective. The Chicago bankers who loaned money for the bridge's construction, proposed lowering the interest rate on the bonds from six to two percent in November 1932, which sparked a lawsuit from bondholders trying to protect their interests. The Cooper River Bridge Corporation continued to struggle with tax problems, but finally convinced the city and the county to reduce their assessments in both 1932 and 1934.

In 1935, US 17, was routed over the bridge after a massive extension project.

In 1936, Cooper River Bridge, Inc filed for reorganization under bankruptcy laws after experiencing financial problems from the near start, citing a $487,879 deficit.

As early as the 1930s, state transportation officials were discussing the idea of buying the Cooper River Bridge. But the discussions turned to debates. Locals disliked the tolls, regarding them as a hindrance to economic development and tourism as well as regional growth. In 1933, Mayor Maybank said, "The entire future of Charleston absolutely depends upon the Cooper River Bridge being made free...if we are to survive as a tourist town this bridge must be free." The county stepped in and bought it in September 1941 for $4,400,000.

On February 17, 1942, the electrical lines were installed on the bridge.

The bridge was officially designated as the John Patrick Grace Memorial Bridge in 1943; as he had died in 1940.

In 1945, the bridge was sold to the state of South Carolina for $4,150,000.

On February 24, 1946, a 12,000-ton cargo ship known as the Nicaragua Victory broke loose from its mooring in the Cooper River. With its engines off, the ship drifted from the city toward Mount Pleasant. Its bow became stuck in the mud, but the stern shifted, slamming into the Grace Memorial Bridge as traffic was crossing. The accident damaged one of the bridge's piers, caused a 240-foot (73 m) section of the mid-structure to collapse, and snapped the power cables on the deck which then exploded. The damages cost a total of $300,000 to fix. The accident caused five people to plunge to their deaths; it contained five members of the Lawson family, Elmer Lawson, Evelyn Lawson, Rose Lawson, Robert Lawson, and Diane Lawson. None of the victims survived the fall, and their car and remains were discovered in March 1946. Most cars saw the accident and stopped, preventing more casualties. After the incident, the ferries were reinstated. The US government, who were the ones chartering the ship, was sued and paid for the repair with taxpayer dollars. In April 1946, a temporary bailey truss was constructed over the damaged section of the bridge so that the permanent one could be rebuilt. However, due to weight limitations, any truck or bus more than 12 tons was denied access and had to turn around. Work was completed in June of that year, and the entire cost was covered by taxpayer dollars. The three collapsed spans 240 feet (73 m) were replaced, power lines were re-wired, and the bridge redecked in the damaged part, at which point the temporary truss was removed.

On July 1, 1946, the toll was finally discontinued, as the last of the bond money had been paid off; the white toll plaza building was also demolished. This move was notable for generally increasing the traffic levels that came across the bridge, and increasing economic growth in the surrounding area.

In 1959, work began on expanding the center roadway that connected the bridge segments on Drum Island from 20 feet to 34 feet. This project was completed in 1960, an emergency breakdown lane was then added.

During construction of the Pearman Bridge, it was discovered that one of the piers of the Grace Memorial bridge had deteriorated significantly due to being eaten away by marine worms, making it likely to collapse if nothing was done. Because of this, wiring was rapped around the pier, and concrete was then poured into said wiring, significantly slowing deterioration.

After the tolls were removed in 1946, the Grace Memorial bridge had become a notorious bottleneck, as it caused back-ups across the entire bridge. As early as the late 1950s, the Grace Memorial Bridge had been deemed functionally obsolete, with its two 10-foot (3.0 m) lanes built for Ford Model As and its poorly designed ramps that went up to six percent. A new bridge was to be built to replace the Grace bridge. Preliminary planning for the bridge had begun in 1961. A ceremony to celabarte the start of actual bridgework was held on May 2, 1963. Plans for the bridge were shifted in 1964, and it ultimately became a secondary span that would simply relieve congestion on the Grace bridge. A reversible lane was added to its design by 1965. The US$15 million bridge opened to traffic on April 29, 1966. The ribbon-cutting ceremony was attended by 500 people.

This span was named the Silas N. Pearman Bridge for Silas Nathaniel Pearman, who served as chief engineer from 1947 to 1961 and then as chief commissioner from 1961 to 1976. Pearman graduated from Clemson University in 1924 and started at the highway department as a surveyor. He died in 1996. The bridge was wider, used concrete piers its entire length, had a wider and slightly lower mid-segment, had longer approaches, lacked the dangerous dips and curves, did not have a deck truss, and had two handed supports. At this point, the Grace Memorial Bridge had its approaches reconstructed as part of the Crosstown Parkway, and the bridge was restriped to serve two lanes of southbound traffic only.

From the opening of the Pearman Bridge to around 1968, renovations were made on the Grace Bridge. These included rebuilding the Grace bridge's Charleston approach, which involved rebuilding some of the at-grade intersections into interchanges and eliminating the rest, adding an extra lane and widening the other two; replacing signage, and extending the approach to the newly built Interstate 26. Additionally, the small, usually inadequate lighting was replaced with new overhead lamps on the right side, all of the side rails were replaced, the curbs were rebuilt, and new electrical lines were installed on the left side to replace the old lines and light poles. Despite this, the alterations ended up narrowing the bridge even further.

In 1979, the Grace Memorial bridge was posted with a 10-ton weight limit, and trucks were banned. Because of this, the signage was updated, and the reversible lane on the Pearman Bridge was converted into a dedicated southbound lane, ensuring that southbound traveling trucks continued to be able to cross the Cooper River at all times. However, this meant that there was always oncoming traffic on the Pearman Bridge, causing many head-on collisions and resulting in many deaths and injuries. Plans for a replacement bridge were developed, however they were not executed. The load limit was later reduced to 5 tons.

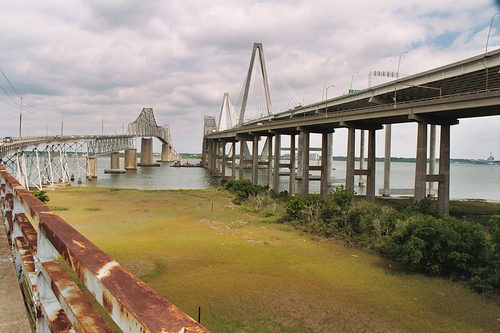
The John P. Grace Memorial Bridge (left), the Silas N. Pearman Bridge (middle), and the current Arthur Ravenel Jr. Bridge (right) in May 2005.

In 1989, the Pearman bridge was retrofitted and repaired after being extensively damaged by Hurricane Hugo.

In 1992, US 701's southern terminus was truncated in Georgetown, leaving behind a solo US 17 to cross over the bridges.

From 1991 to 1993, both bridges were extensively rehabilitated.

In order to reduce head-on collisions, SCDOT installed plastic delineators on the Pearman bridge in 2002.

During construction of the Ravenel bridge, hurricane cables were installed on the bridges.

== Replacement ==
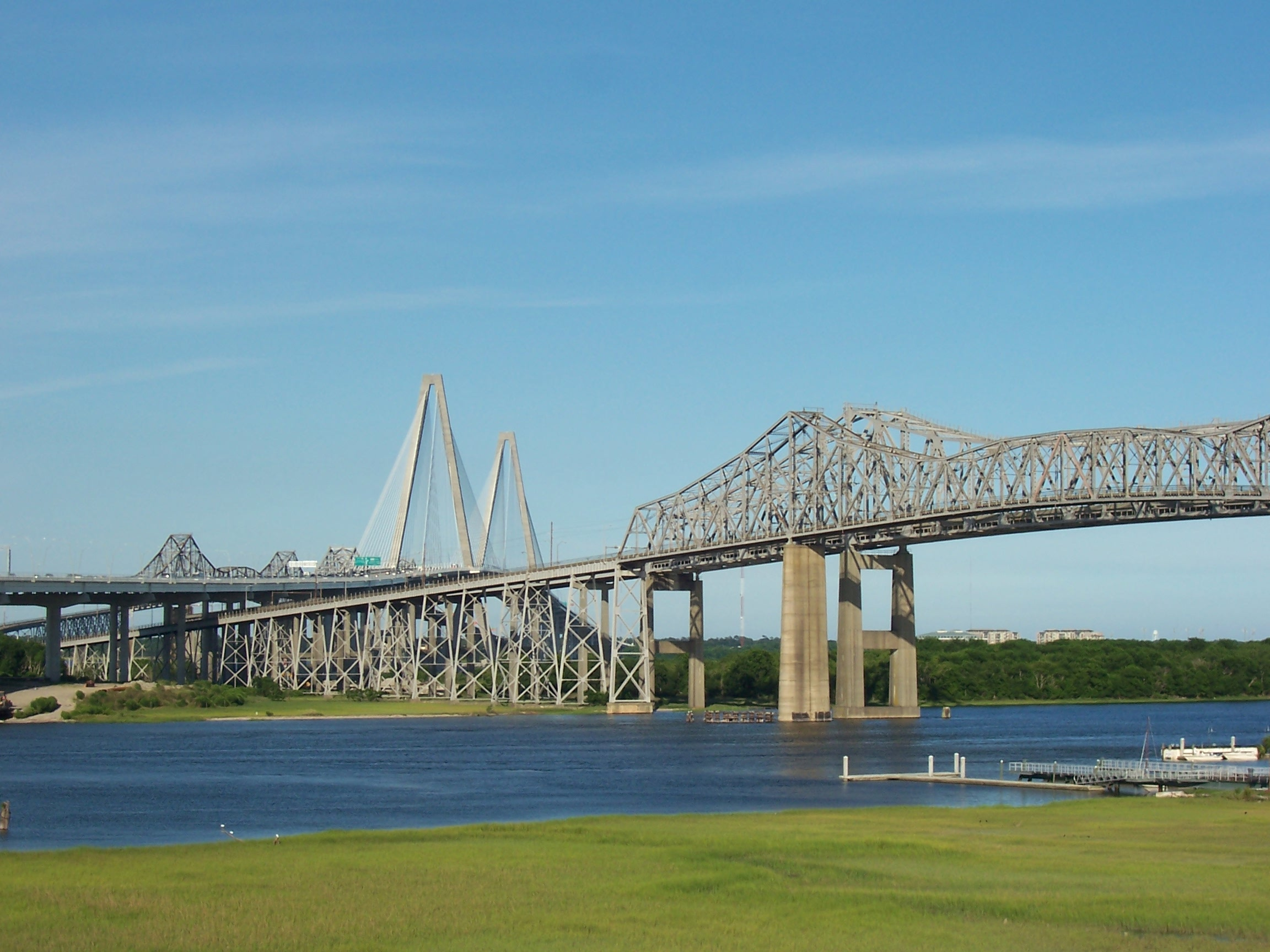
Arthur Ravenel Jr. Bridge with old Cooper River Bridges still in situ

By the 1950s, the Grace Bridge had become obsolete, with it also becoming structurally deficient in 1979. There were plans to replace it, but they were ultimately scrapped due to funding constraints. By the 1990s, an increase of population became a strain on Pearman bridge as well, and with it came even more head-on collisions. They had both become functionally obsolete, as both lacked a breakdown lane, and the Pearman had no median barrier between the northbound lanes and southbound lanes. Three of Charleston's four shipping terminals are situated up the Cooper and Wando Rivers, and plans were made in the 2000s to expand the Panama canal, and if the bridges were not replaced, Charleston Harbor would lose profit to other ports. In 1995, the Grace Memorial Bridge scored only a 4 out of 100 (4 percent), or an F, in safety; in a 1998 structural evaluation, the Pearman Bridge scored a 55 out of 100, indicating imminent deficiency. Arthur Ravenel Jr. ran for South Carolina Senate as a way to solve the problem. He planned for an eight-lane bridge to replace the functionally obsolete, rapidly deteriorating bridges that carried the Septa Clark Expressway and US 17. Work on the Arthur Ravenel Jr. Bridge, a cable-stayed bridge which features a higher roadway and contains eight shouldered lanes and a pedestrian walkway, began in 2002 and was completed on July 15, 2005.

== Demolition ==
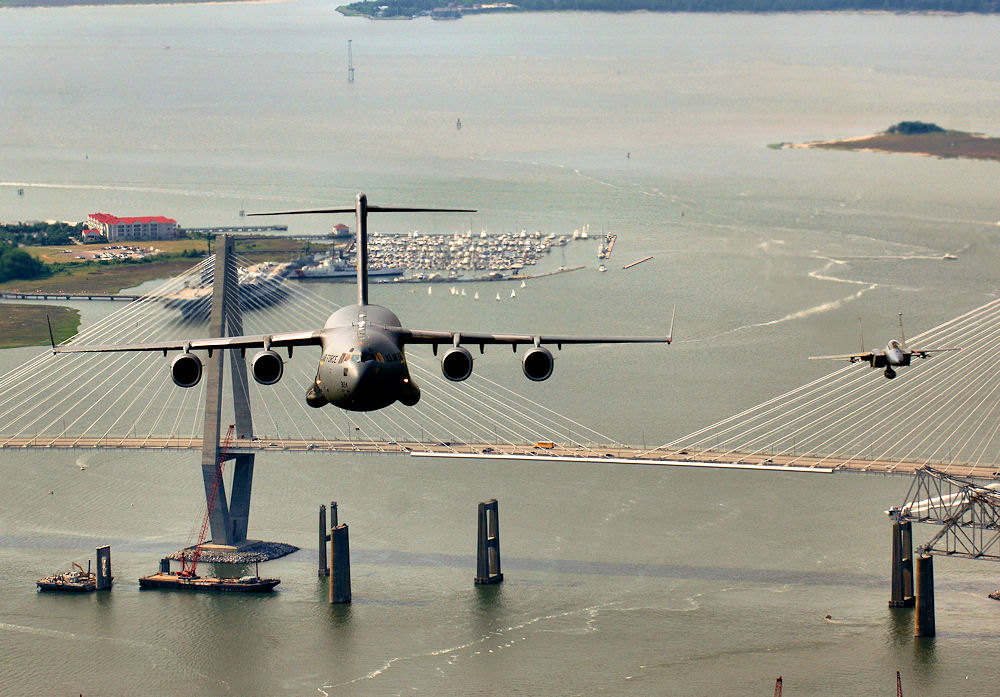
A 315th Airlift Wing C-17 Globemaster II flying over the new Arthur Ravenel Jr. Bridge, with demolitions of the old Cooper River Bridges in the background.

After the Ravenel Bridge was opened, a "Burn The Bridges" run and parade was celebrated, which involved many 1929 typical cars driving over the empty deck of the Pearman Bridge. After this Demolition began. The Pearman Bridges began on August 6, with the Grace Bridge following on August 9. SCDOT contracted JV partners Cashman and Testa to demolish both of the bridges. It was planned as a reverse-engineering project that was done with the help of Weidlinger Associates. Cashman brought construction management and marine equipment, and Testa, which had been demolishing bridges and been a demolition contractor since its start, brought excavation, earthwork, and a variety of demolition tools.

Demolition of the Pearman Bridge began on August 6, 2005. The approaches were demolished with construction equipment The deck was then removed, with most of the deck being removed and then cleared with machinery, at which point it was cleaned up and the girder beams blasted. The foundations were usually the first part of the bridge support detonated, with the fully exposed pier being demolished second. The mid segment was cut away from the cantilever sections and lowered onto a barge, which was then carried off to be used as scrap metal. The Town Creek mid-segment was demolished with explosives. The Drum Island segment was mostly deconstructed with explosives.

Demolition of the Grace Bridge began on August 9, 2005. The overpasses to the approach roadways were the first part to be leveled. The roadway approaches were also leveled, with the concrete roadway onto the bridge being smashed and removed. In order to demolish the bridge itself, the bridge had its deck removed, and its piers were cut through, at which point they had explosives placed on the roadway supports. The foundation was then demolished with explosives, at which point the pier would be blasted later. The Town Creek mid-segment was demolished with explosives. The metallic piers were collapsed with machinery.

The final of the Pearman Bridges piers were imploded on February 28, 2007. The Graces final pier was then prepped, it was imploded on March 27. After the full demolition, work transitioned to removing debris, cleaning up bridge remains, removing work equipment, and reconstructing city streets with new utilities that used to be in the footprint of the old bridge. The cleanup and rebuild was completed by April 10, 2007, finally finishing the demolition project. It ultimately took 2 1/2 years to demolish the bridges and destroy their approaches.

After the demolition of the bridges and their approaches, and the reconstruction of the city streets, only one Pillar from the approach of the Pearman Bridge remains as a reminder and a tourist attraction in Charleston, all the Grace Bridge pillars were demolished.

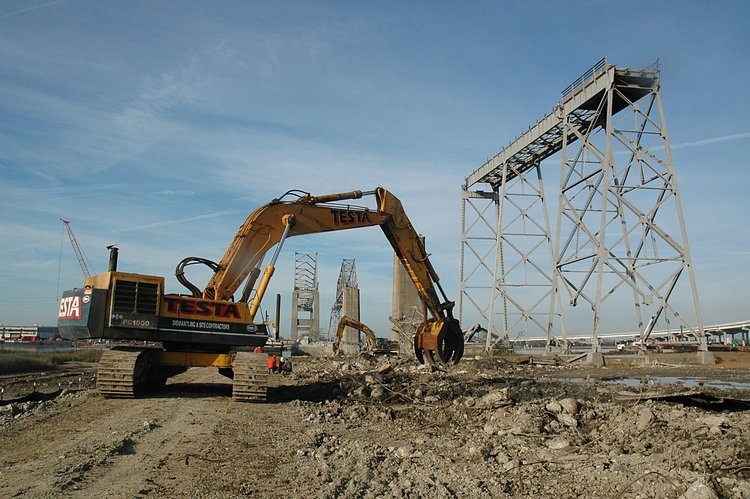
Demolition site at Drum Island

== See also ==
- List of bridges documented by the Historic American Engineering Record in South Carolina
