= Ravenel (surname) =

Ravenel is a surname. Notable people with the surname include:

- Arthur Ravenel, Jr. (1927-2023), an American businessman and politician
  - Arthur Ravenel Jr. Bridge, South Carolina, United States
- Beatrice Ravenel (1870–1956), American poet
- Beatrice St. Julien Ravenel (1904–1990), American writer
- Charles D. Ravenel (1938-2017), American politician
- Douglas Ravenel (born 1947), American mathematician
- Harriott Horry Ravenel (1832–1912), American writer and historian
- Henry William Ravenel (1814–1887), American botanist
- St. Julien Ravenel (1819–1882), American physician and chemist
- Thomas Ravenel (born 1962), former State Treasurer of South Carolina
- William Bee Ravenel III, (1914–1968), educator and soldier

== See also ==
- William Ravenel House in South Carolina, United States
