= The Battery (Charleston) =

Promenade in South Carolina, United States

Coordinates: 32.7692°N 79.9288°W

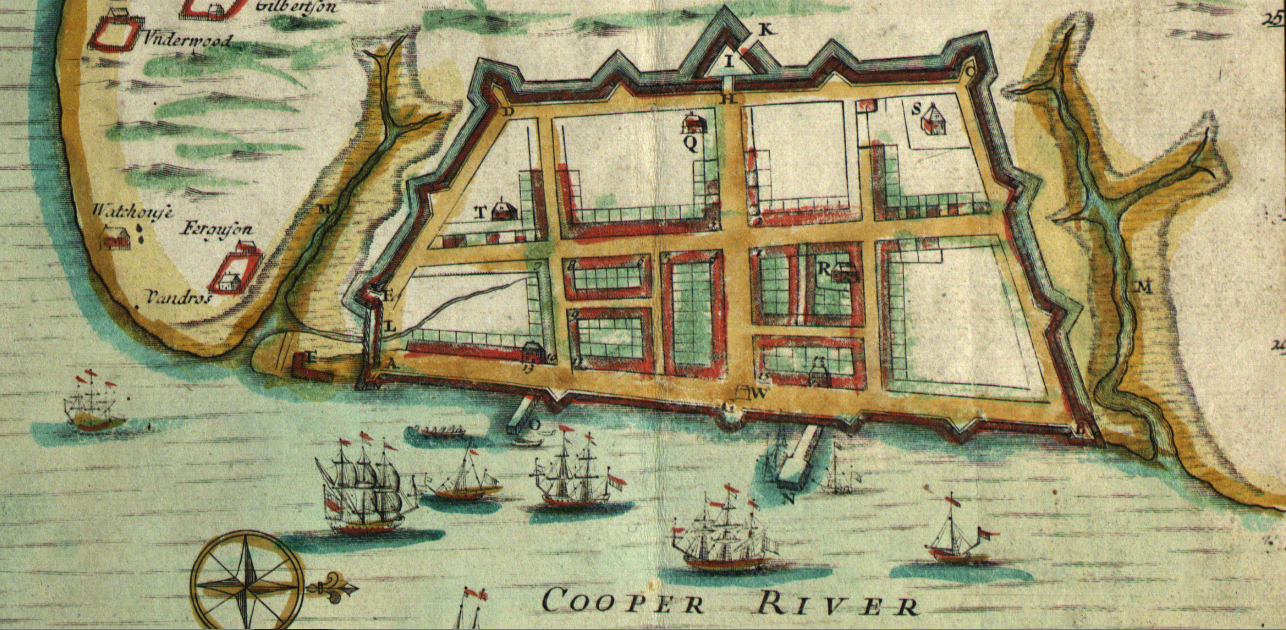
Crisp Map of Charleston in 1711, where A, E, D, C, and B are the Granville, Ashley, Colleton, Carteret, and Craven Bastions respectively, I is Johnson's Half Moon, and G is another Half Moon. The stream to the immediate south is Vanderhorst Creek, now Water Street, with White Point to the south.

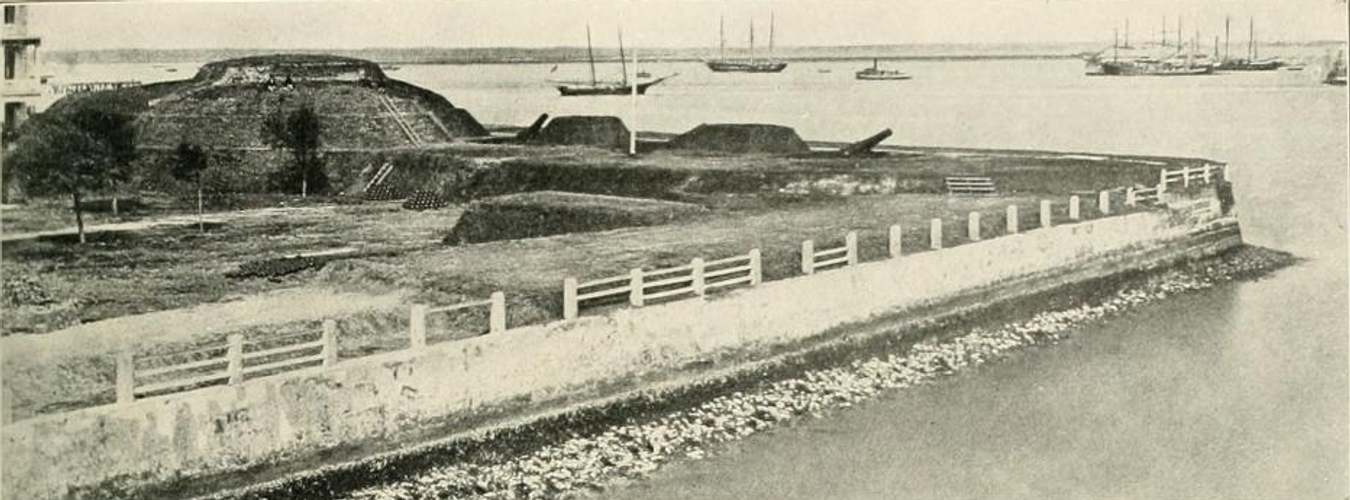
Two ten-inch Columbiads at the South Battery guard Charleston Harbor (1863)

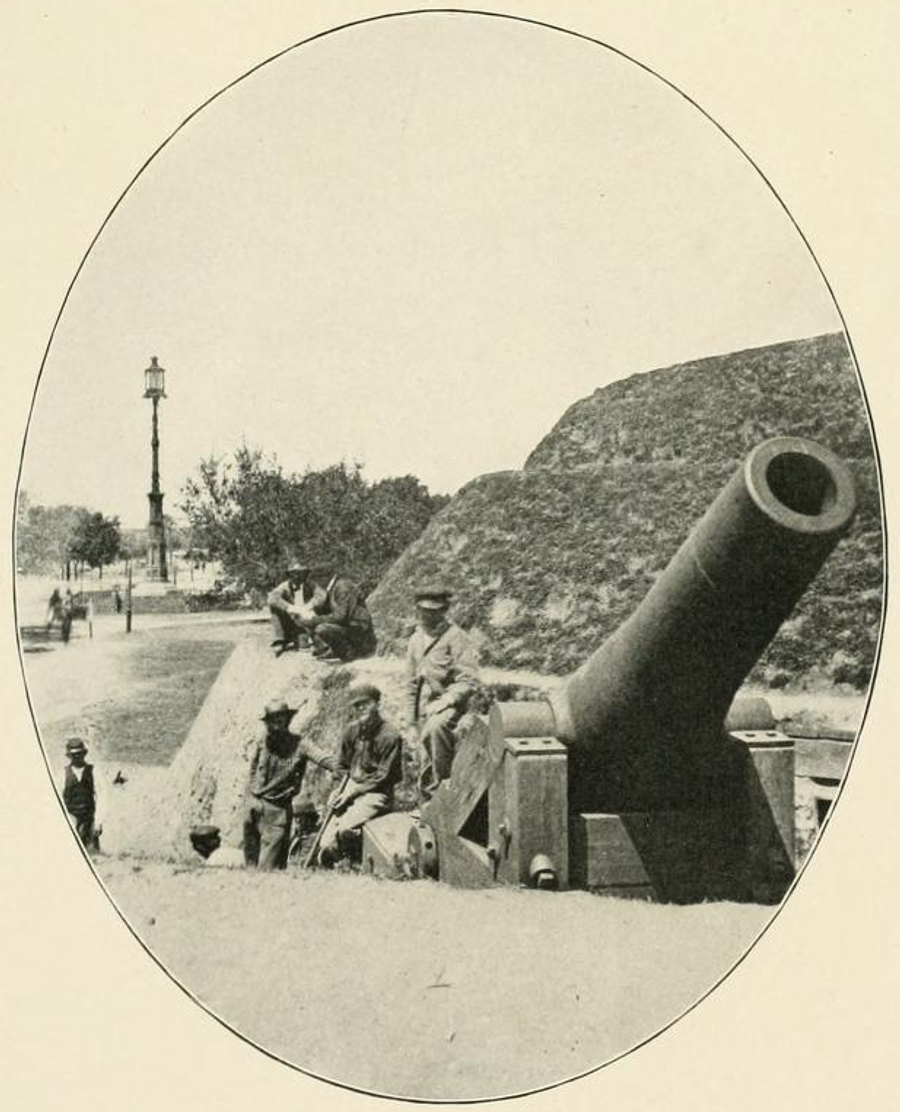
Closeup of a Columbiad at South Battery (1863)

The Battery is a landmark defensive seawall and promenade in Charleston, South Carolina. Named for a pre–Civil War coastal defense artillery battery originally built by the British at the site, it stretches along the lower shores of the Charleston peninsula, bordered by the Ashley and Cooper Rivers, which meet here to form Charleston Harbor.

== Location ==
Historically, it has been understood to extend from the beginning of the seawall at the site of the former Omar Shrine Temple (40–44 East Bay Street) to the intersection of what is now Murray Boulevard and King Street. The higher part of the promenade, paralleling East Battery, as the street is known south of Water Street, to the intersection of Murray Boulevard, is known as High Battery. Fort Sumter is visible from the Cooper River side (High Battery) and from the point, as are Castle Pinckney, the World War II aircraft carrier USS Yorktown (CV-10), Fort Moultrie, and Sullivan's Island.

In popular speech and in a number of unofficial guidebooks and Web sites, the Battery and White Point Garden are sometimes referred to as "Battery Park," but the park and seawall promenade are not regarded by the City of Charleston as a single entity, and the term "Battery Park" is not an official designation.

== History ==
Fort Broughton (ca. 1735) and Fort Wilkins (during the American Revolution and War of 1812) occupied White or Oyster Point, so named because of the piles of bleached oyster shells on the point at the tip of the peninsula. In the 18th century, rocks and heavy materials were used to fortify the shore of the Cooper River on the eastern side of the peninsula. In 1838, this area along the seawall became a promenade. First used as a public park in 1837, the area now known as White Point Garden became a place for artillery during the American Civil War.

Colleton Bastion was located near the intersection of Water and Meeting Streets. During the Siege of Charleston, the British had to contend with Fort Johnson, Broughton's Battery, Dorrell's Fort, Wilkins' Fort, and Gibbs' Fort (at the foot of King Street). During the Quasi-War Fort Mechanic (ca. 1795) stood where the current Edmondston-Alston House is now located. During the Civil War, Battery Ramsay occupied White Point Garden.

== Architecture ==
As a tourist destination, the Battery is famous for its stately, mainly antebellum homes. Included among the grand houses are the Louis DeSaussure House (1 East Battery), the Roper House (9 East Battery), the William Ravenel House (13 East Battery), the Edmondston-Alston House (21 East Battery), the Charles Drayton House (25 East Battery), the George Chisolm House (39 East Battery), the Villa Margherita (4 South Battery), the William Washington House (8 South Battery), the Col. John A.S. Ashe House (26 South Battery), the James Spear House (30 South Battery), and the Col. John Ashe House (32 South Battery).

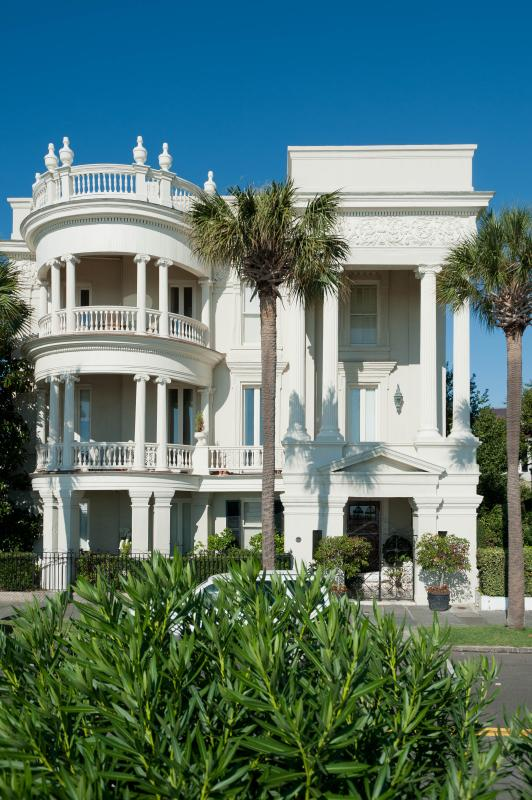
Porcher-Simonds House, 29 East Battery

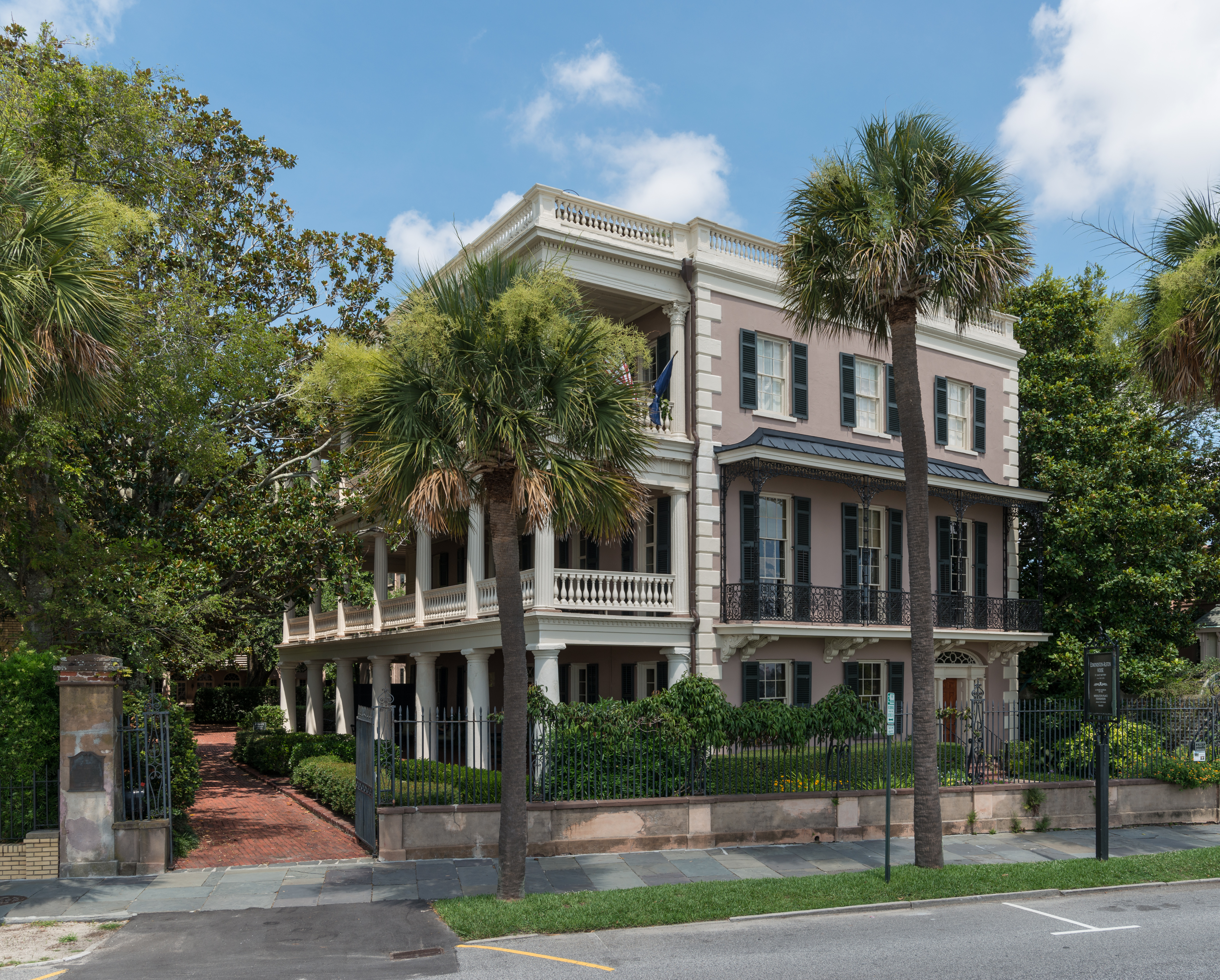
Edmondston-Alston House, 21 East Battery

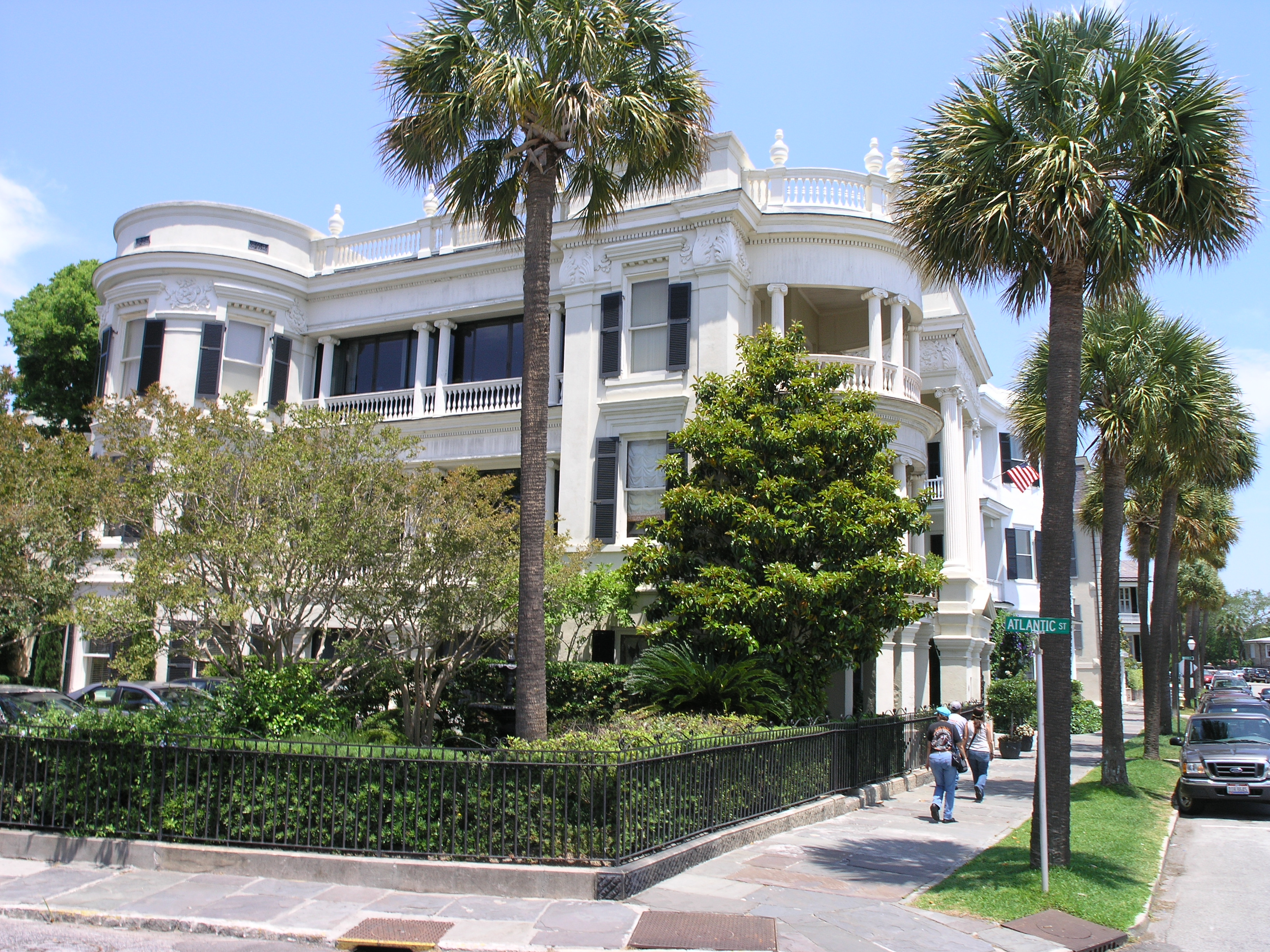
Intersection of Atlantic Street and East Battery

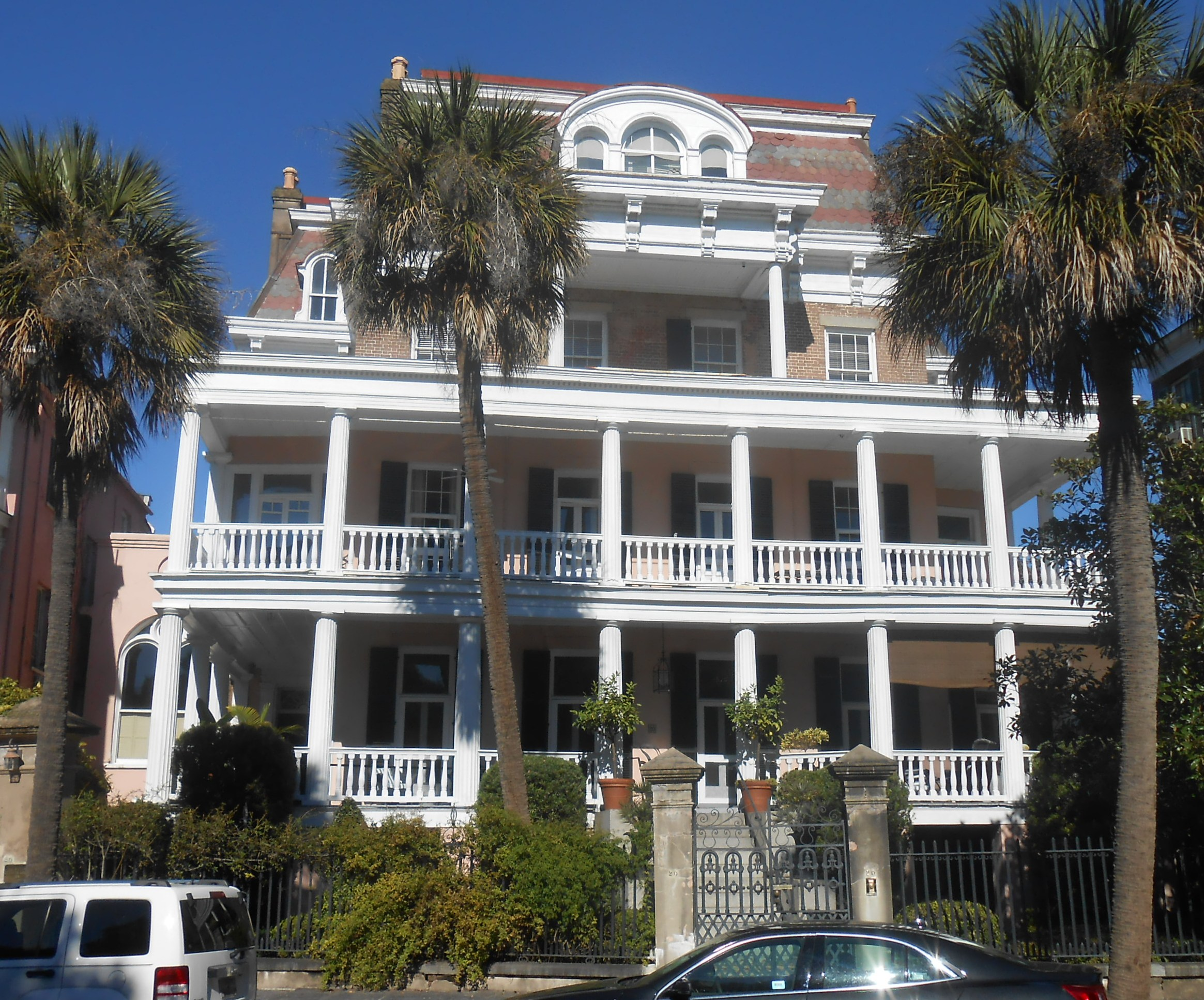
20 South Battery, a boutique hotel

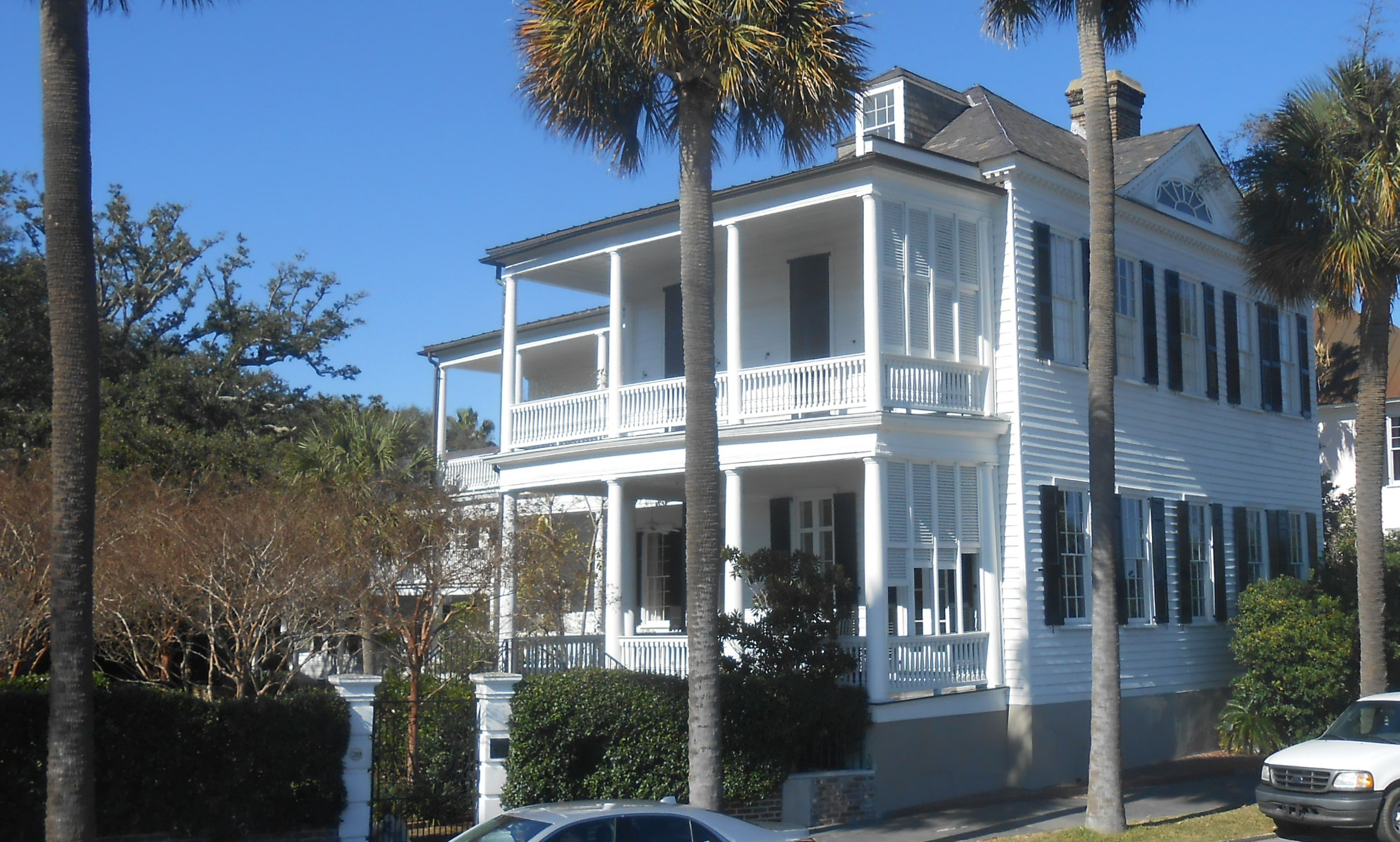
George Chisolm House, 39 East Battery

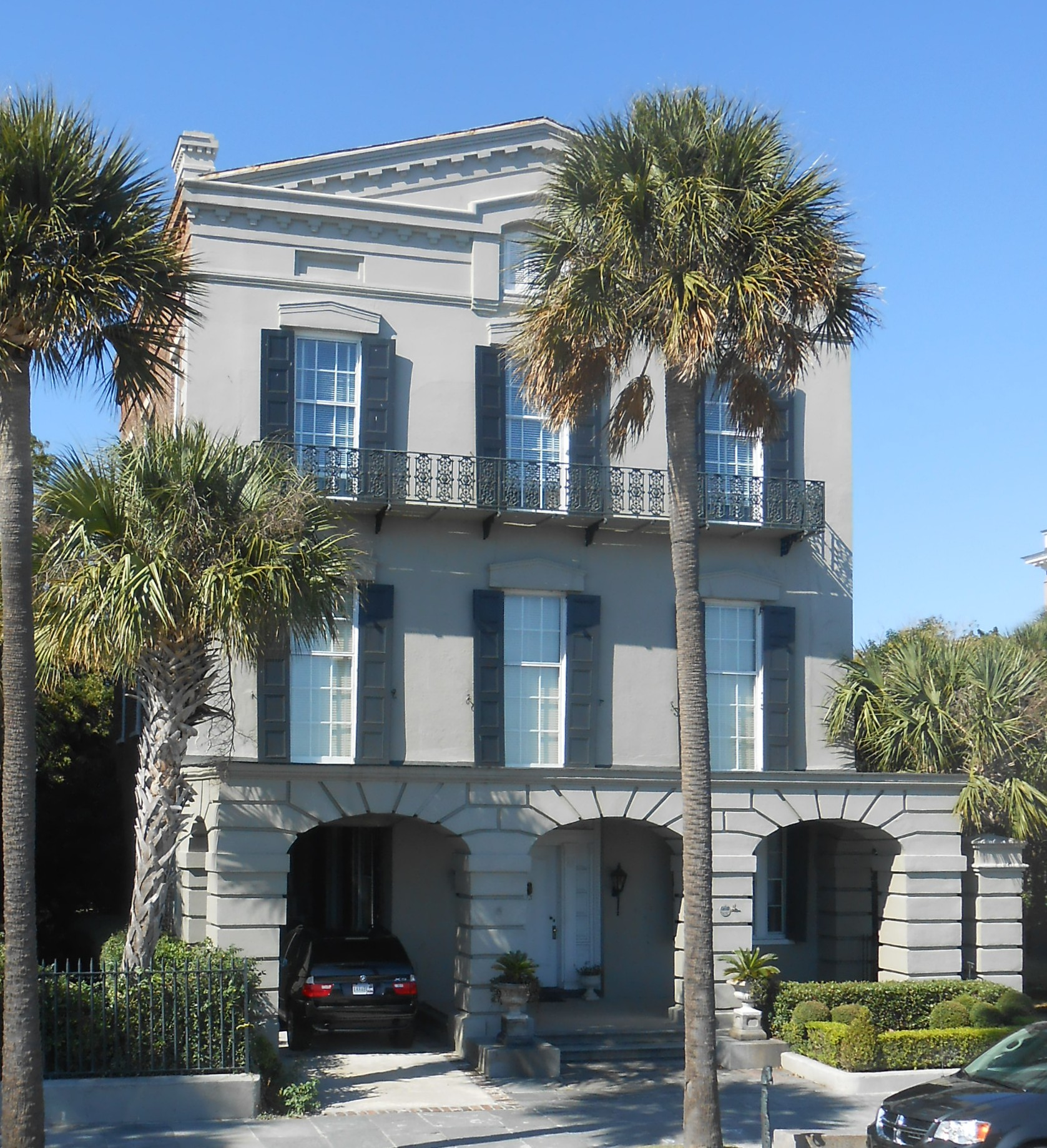
William Ravenel House, 13 East Battery

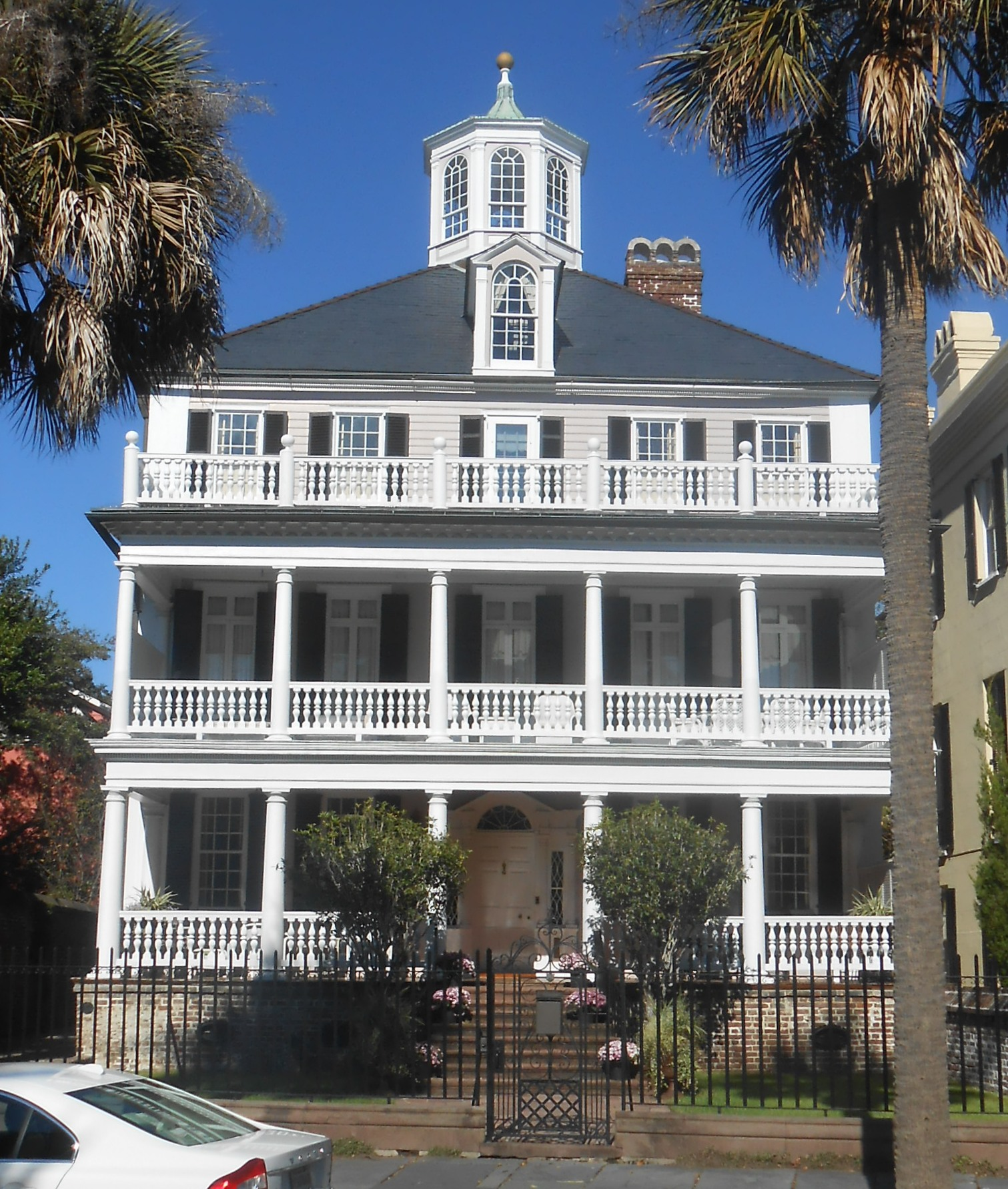
Col. John Ashe House, 32 East Battery

== The Battery today ==
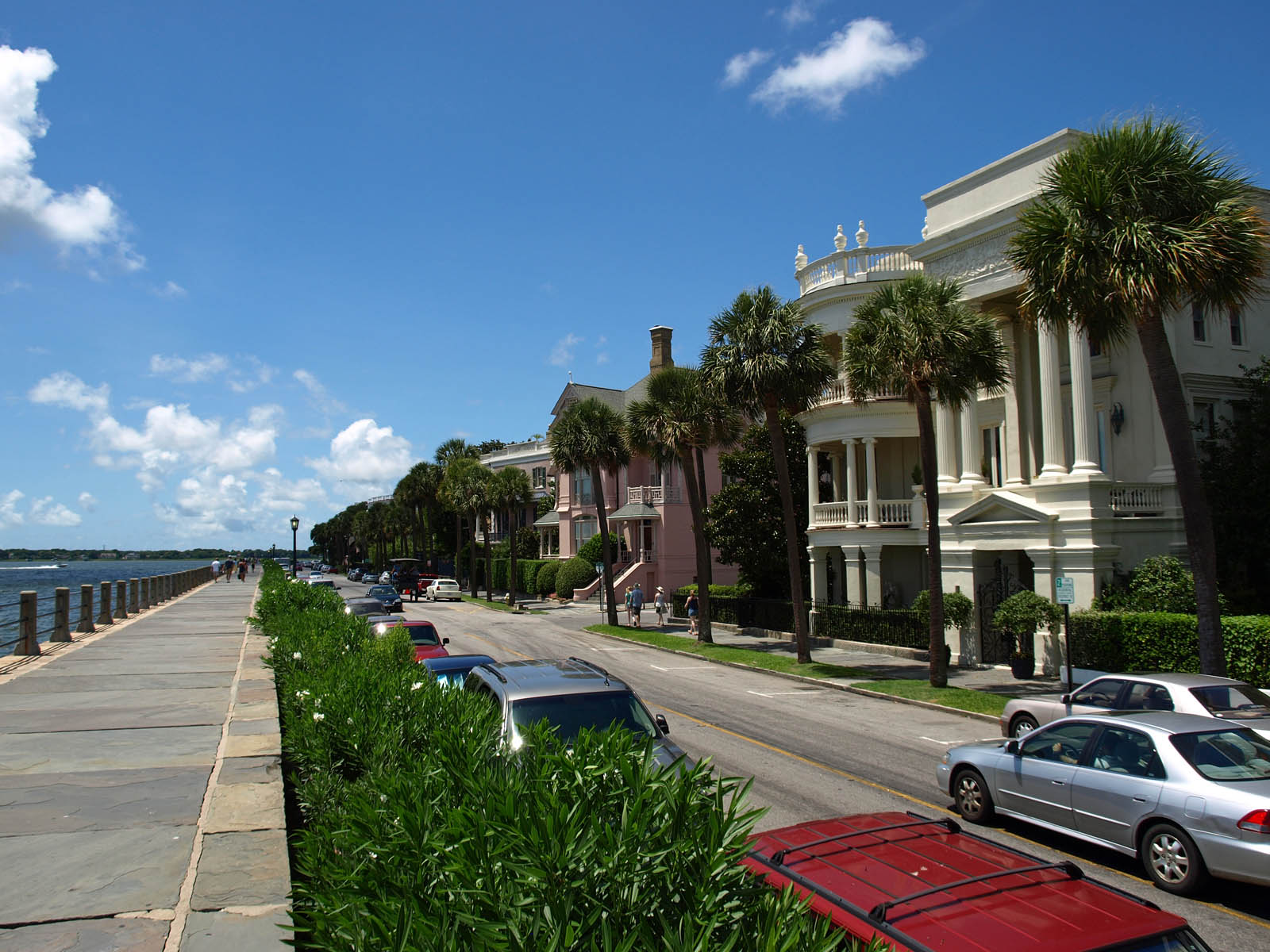
View of East Battery Street in 2010

In 2004, a structural report by the City of Charleston showed that the Battery was suffering serious problems and could fail to protect the southeastern portion of the city during hurricanes. In 2012, the City announced that a $3.2 million restoration project would soon commence at the juncture of High Battery (along East Battery) and Low Battery (along Murray Blvd.).

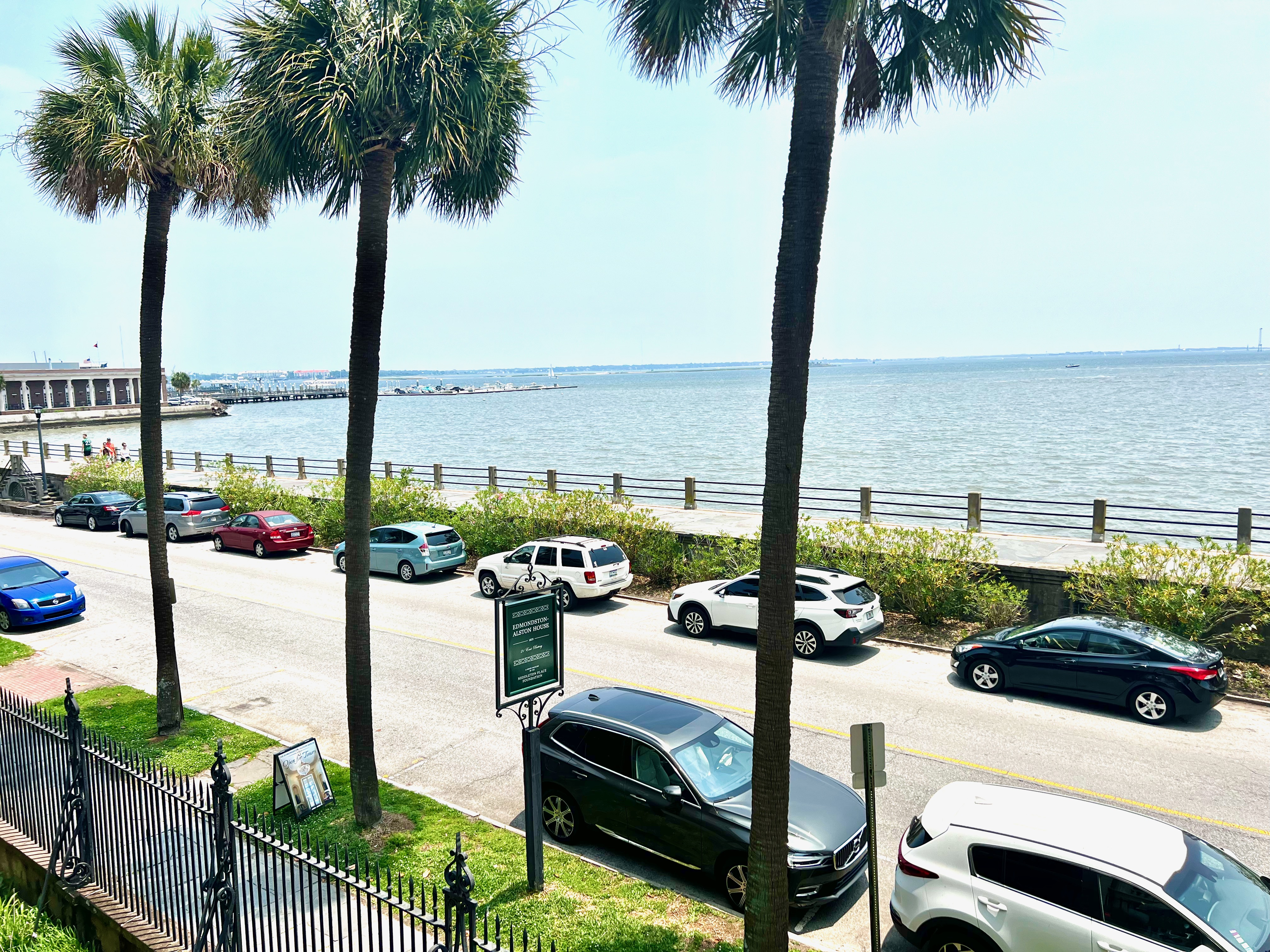
The Battery viewed from balcony of the Edmondson-Alston House, 21 East Battery

In August 2023, Tropical Storm Idalia breached the Battery and flooded portions of the downtown.

== See also ==
Media related to Battery Park (Charleston) at Wikimedia Commons
