= George Chisolm House =

House in Charleston, South Carolina

Coordinates: 32.773129°N 79.927551°W

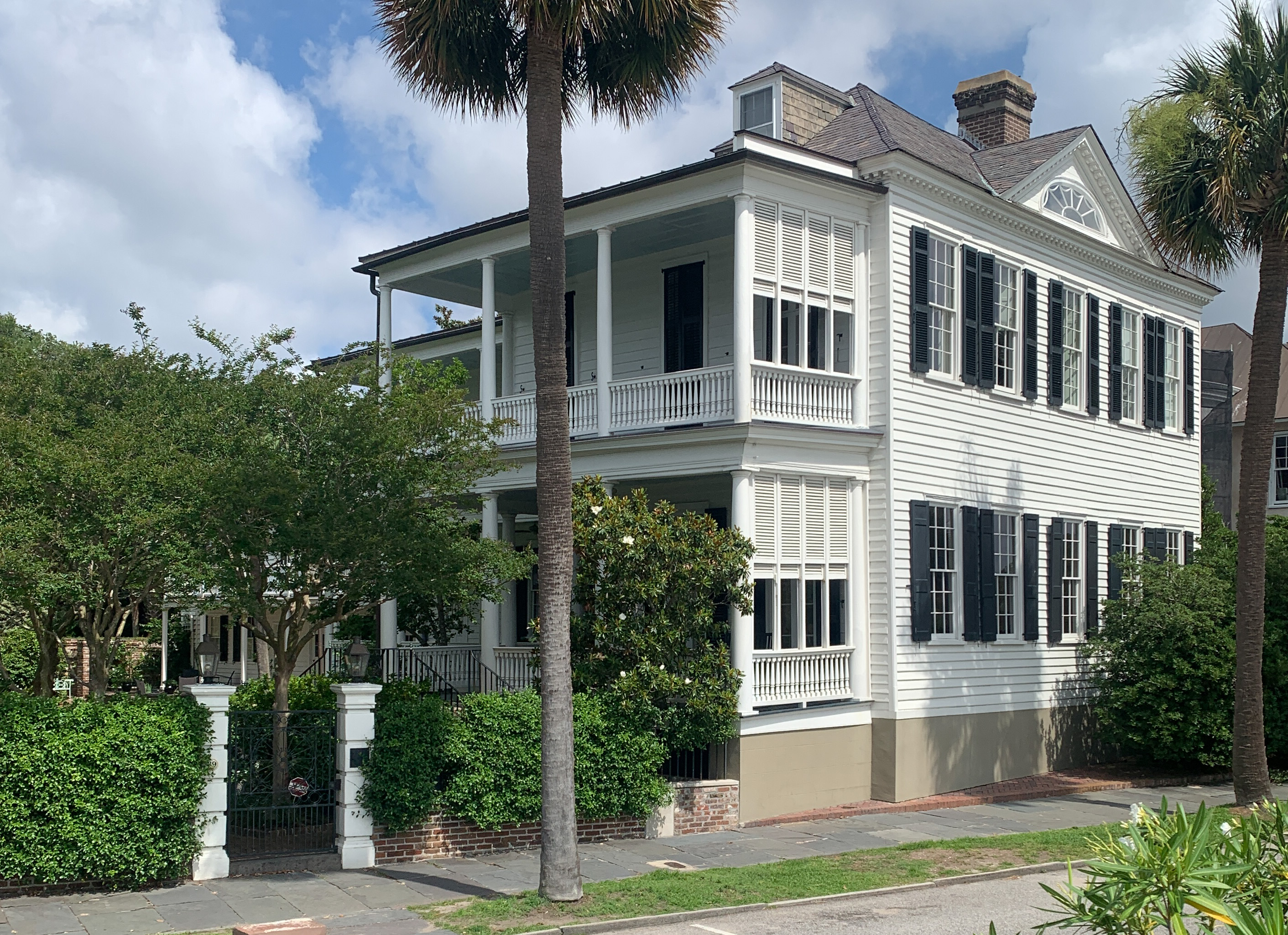
The George Chisolm House is at 39 East Bay Street, Charleston, South Carolina.

The George Chisolm House is a two-and-one-half-story house located in Charleston, South Carolina. It is the first house to have been built upon the landfill project that formed Charleston, South Carolina's Battery. The house is believed to have been built in 1810 and was built for trader George Chisolm in the Federal style. The garden to the south of the house was designed by Loutrel Briggs and later modified by Sheila Wertimer. The address of the George Chisolm House is 39 East Bay Street; its former address was 39 East Battery Street.

In 1877, the house was bought by Edwin P. Frost. Frost served as a vestryman at St. Michael's Episcopal Church where he was responsible for hiring Tiffany & Co. to decorate its chancel. At the same time, he had the company decorate the living room of 39 East Battery with gold leaf. The decoration was removed in 1970.

Beginning circa 1975, Lorna Colbert and her family (including son Stephen Colbert) occupied the house while she ran the carriage house as a bed and breakfast.

== See also ==
- West Point Rice Mill
