= Vernon Bailey =

Vernon Bailey may refer to:

- Vernon Howe Bailey (1874–1953), American artist and photographer
- Vernon Orlando Bailey (1864–1942), American naturalist
