= Ravanel =

Ravanel is a surname. Notable people with the surname include:

- Cédric Ravanel (born 1978), French mountain biker
- Gilbert Ravanel (1900–1983), French skier
- Serge Ravanel (1920–2009), French Resistance fighter

== See also ==
- Ravenel (disambiguation)
