= Ravenel =

Ravenel may refer to:

== Places ==
- Ravenel, Oise, a place in France
- Ravenel, South Carolina, United States

== Other uses ==
- Ravenel conjectures
- Ravenel (surname)
