= Harriott Horry Ravenel =

American writer

- Born: Harriott Horry Rutledge; August 12, 1832; Charleston, South Carolina, U.S.
- Died: July 2, 1912 (aged 79); Charleston, South Carolina, U.S.
- Other names: Mrs. St. Julien Ravenel; Mrs. H. Hilton Broom
- Occupation: writer
- Years active: 1879–1906
- Spouse: St. Julien Ravenel
- Children: Harriott Rutledge (1852); Anna Eliza (1853); John (1856); Lise R. (1857); Edward Rutledge (1859); St. Julien (1861); Frances Gualdo (1865); Francis ('Frank') Gualdo (1869); Helen Lowndes (1872)

Harriott Horry Rutledge Ravenel (August 12, 1832 – July 2, 1912) was an American writer known for a handful of biographies and histories that focused on the development of South Carolina before the Civil War and were influential in shaping the work of later historians and writers.

== Early years ==
Harriott Horry Rutledge was born in Charleston, South Carolina on August 12, 1832, the only child of Rebecca Motte Lowndes and Edward Cotesworth Rutledge, a naval captain. Her family was well-connected: her mother was the daughter of Congressman William Lowndes, granddaughter of statesman Thomas Pinckney, and great-granddaughter of agriculturalist Eliza Pinckney and judge Charles Pinckney; Eliza Pinckney and William Lowndes would later be the subject of biographies by Ravenel. One of her uncles was herpetologist John Edwards Holbrook.

Ravenel's literary talent is evident in surviving letters she wrote as a child. She was educated at Madame Talvande's private school, housed in the Sword Gate House.

In 1851, she married the American physician and agricultural chemist St. Julien Ravenel, with whom she had nine children. One of her sons, Francis, would marry Charleston poet Beatrice Witte, and their daughter Beatrice St. Julien Ravenel was also a writer.

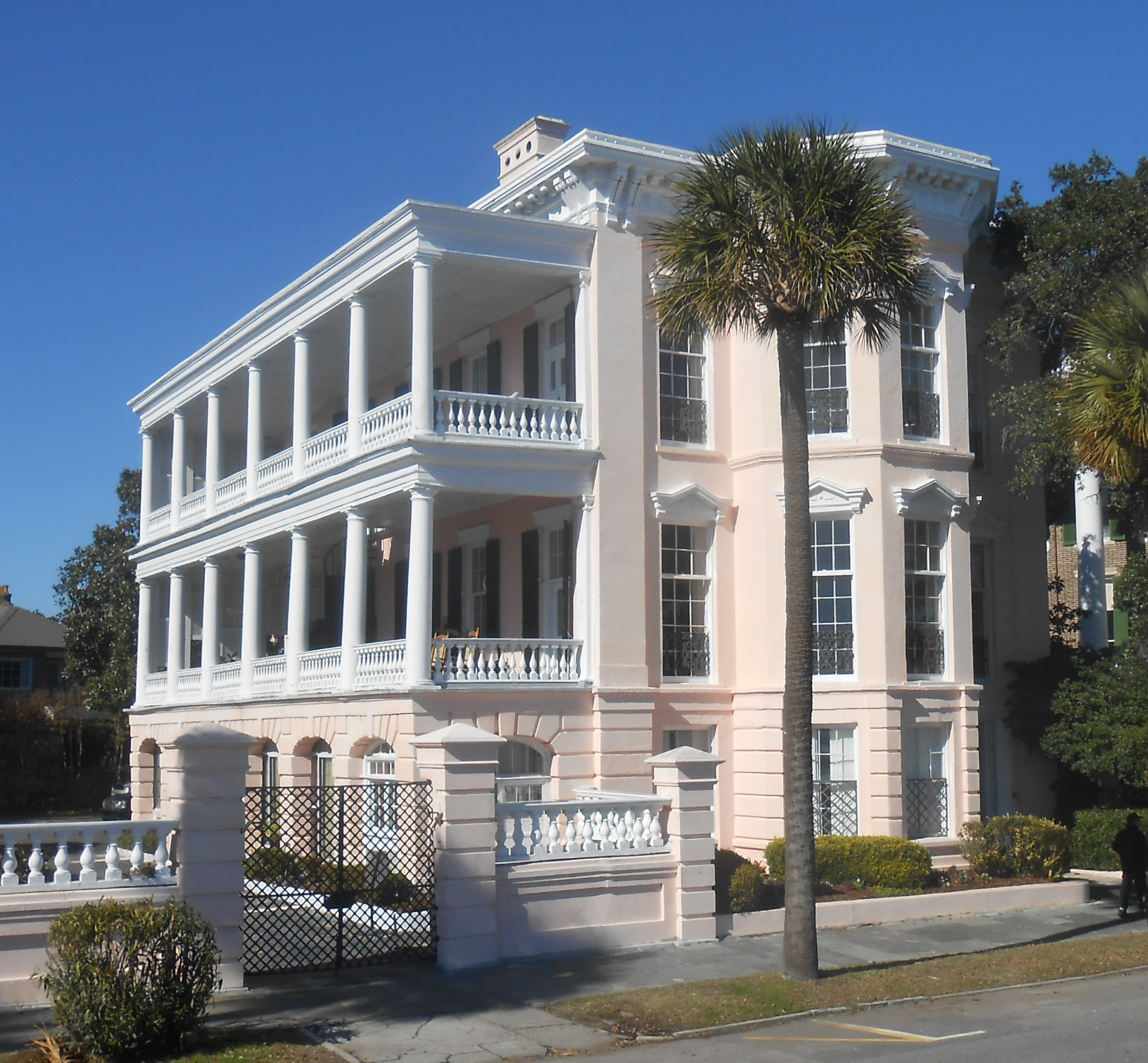
5 East Battery in Charleston, SC, where Harriott Horry Ravenel lived with her family. It had been inherited by her husband, St. Julien Ravenel.

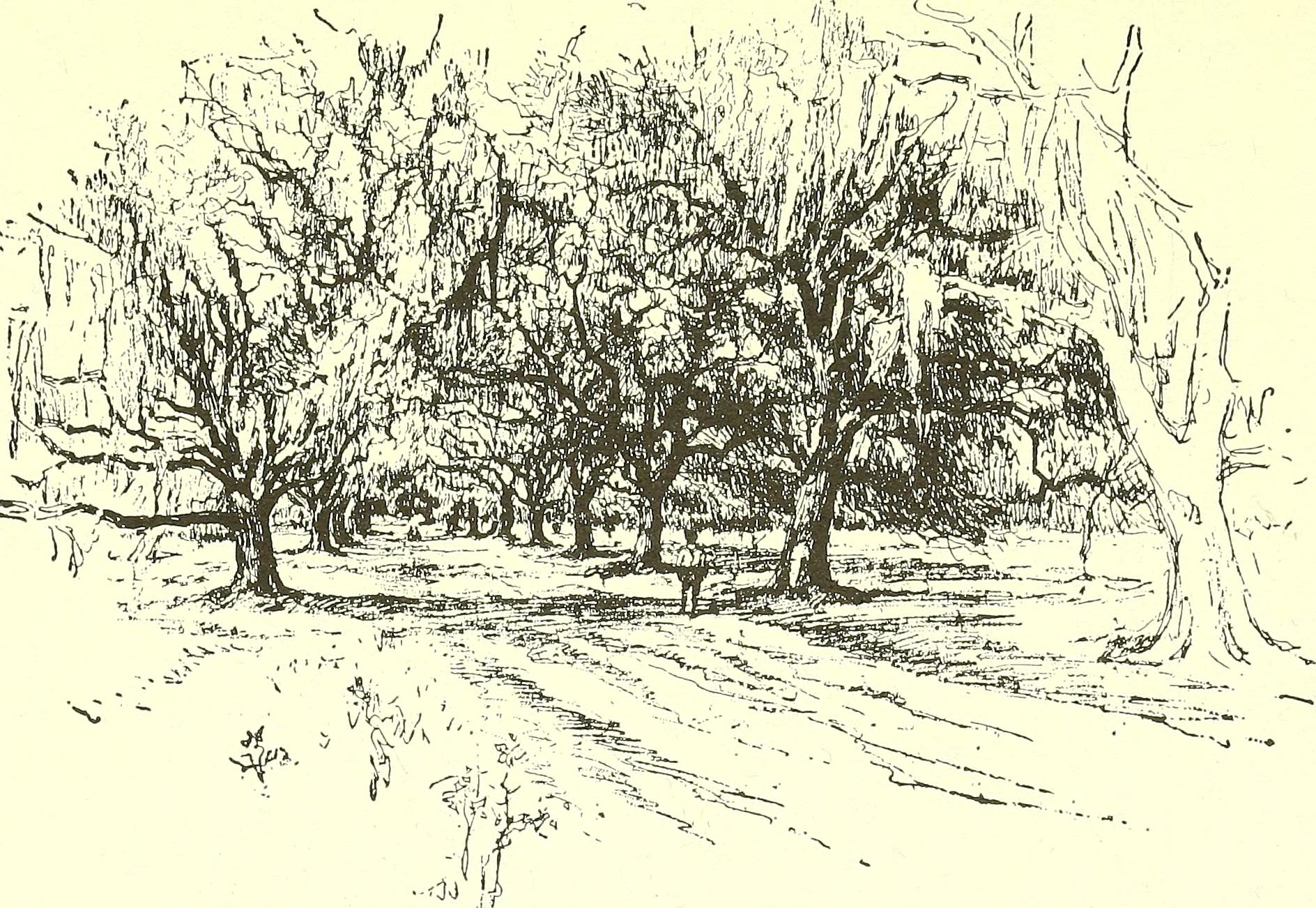
Illustration by Vernon Howe Bailey for Charleston: The Place and the People, by Harriott Horry Ravenel (1906).

== Writing ==
At the outbreak of the Civil War, Ravenel accompanied her husband to Columbia, SC, where he was to take charge of a laboratory to produce medicines for the Confederate States Army. Ravenel's experiences in 1865 trying to save their home from fire when the city burned following the arrival of General Sherman featured in an article, "When Columbia Burned," as well as in one of her books, South Carolina Women in the Confederacy (1903). She was a close friend of Mary Chesnut, who wrote a celebrated Civil War diary.

After the war, Ravenel and her family moved back to Charleston. Ravenel started writing short stories in the 1870s and published a novella about antebellum South Carolina, Ashurst; or, The Days That Are Not, in 1879. Published (like some of her other early writing) under the pseudonym 'Mrs. H. Hilton Broom', it won a local newspaper award. She is best known, however, for her three books about the history of South Carolina in general and Charleston in particular: The Life of Eliza Pinckney (1896), The Life and Times of William Lowndes (1901), and Charleston: The Place and the People (1906). The illustrations for the latter book were by Vernon Howe Bailey.

Ravenel was a good writer and an able historian, and Charleston: The Place and the People—which devoted nine-tenths of its 500 pages to the years before 1830—was influential in establishing a strain of backward-looking literature in South Carolina. Ravenel's book on Eliza Pinckney, which centered on Pinckney's letters with a running commentary by Ravenel, was the first full-length biography of Pinckney that didn't heavily fictionalize her life, and it helped to spur renewed scholarly interest in Pinckney's life and accomplishments.

Ravenel was one of the earliest members of the South Carolina Historical Society and served as president (1896–98) of the South Carolina Society of the Colonial Dames of America.

Ravenel died July 2, 1912, in Charleston, having survived her husband by thirty years.

Documents (including diaries) concerning Ravenel and various relatives are held by the South Carolina Historical Society. The Charleston Library Society holds a portrait of Ravenel painted by Charles Van Dyke shortly before her death.
