= William Washington House =

Coordinates: 32.770425°N 79.929556°W

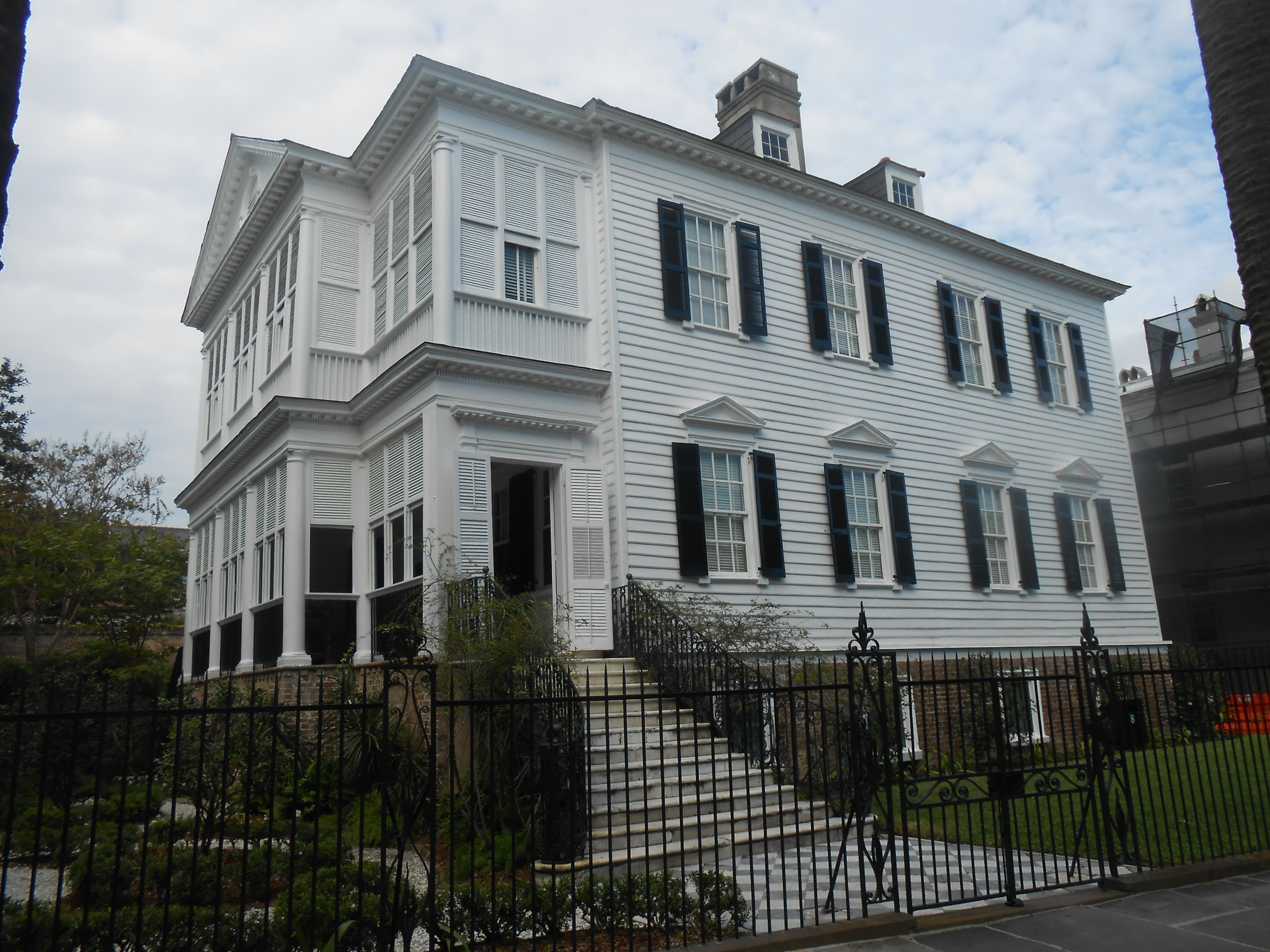

The William Washington House is a pre-Revolutionary house at 8 South Battery, Charleston, South Carolina. It is the only pre-Revolutionary house on Charleston's Battery. Thomas Savage bought the lot at the southwest corner of Church St. and South Battery in 1768 and soon built his house there. The resulting structure is a nationally important, Georgian style, square, wooden, two-story house on a high foundation.

In December 1785, Revolutionary War hero William Washington purchased the house. He and his wife remained until his death in 1810. His widow remained until her own death in 1830, when it passed to her daughter Jane, wife of James H. Ancrum. Since 1916, the house has remained in the family of Julian Mitchell.
