= James Spear House =

Coordinates: 32°46′14.64″N 79°55′53.48″W

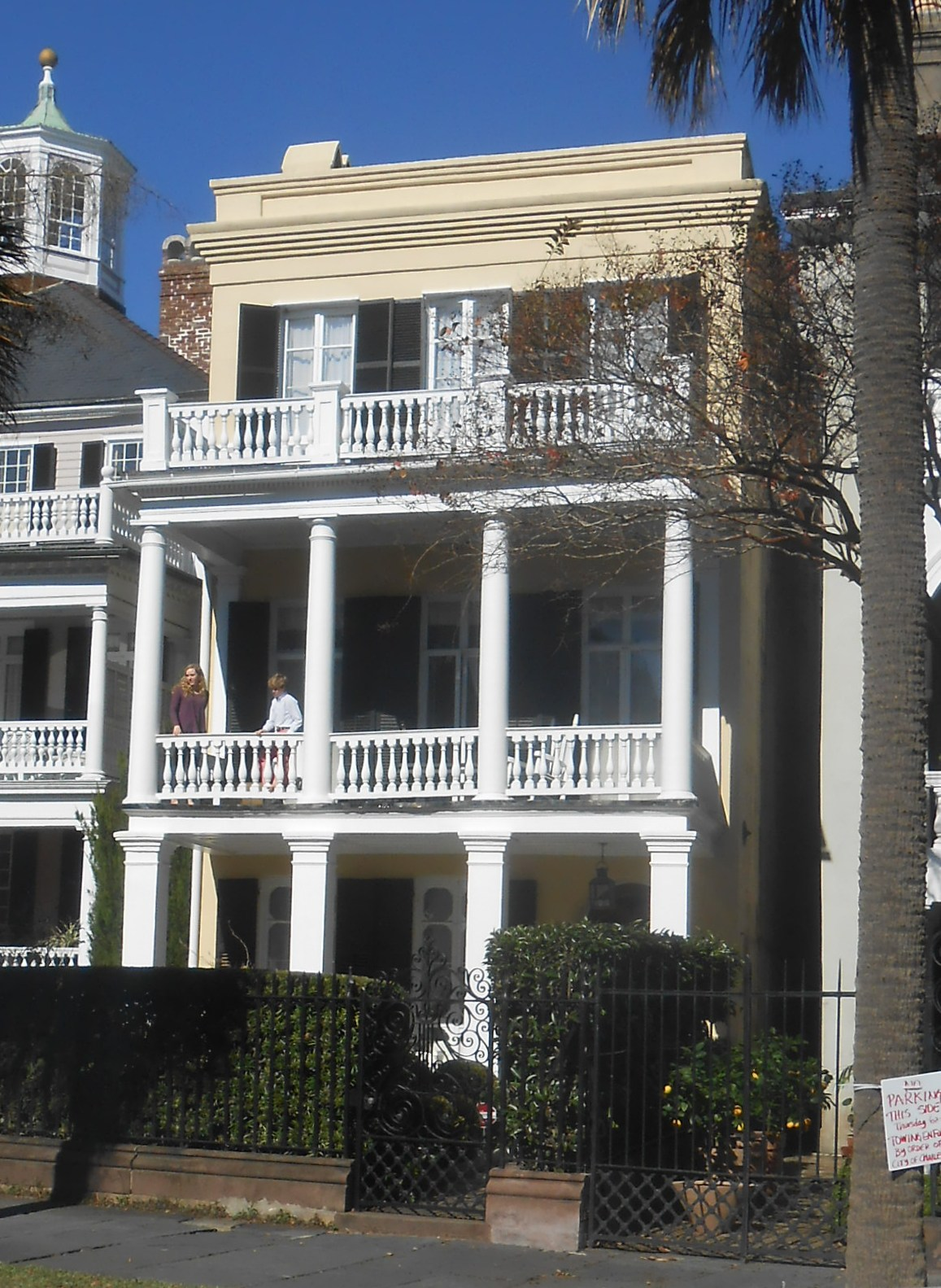
The James Spear House at 30 South Battery, Charleston, South Carolina

The James Spear House is a historic home in Charleston, South Carolina along Charleston's Battery. The property upon which the house was built was acquired by James Spear in 1860 for $5,000; a plat connected with the sale does not reveal any improvements to the lot. However, by the time of a municipal census conducted in 1861, Spear was already occupying the house.

The house is a three-story brick house in the Italianate style that was popular in Charleston just before the Civil War. The house has a two-story porch across the front (south facade) with a third story that is open to the elements. Behind the house, there is a two-story service building original to the house. The service building was connected to the house some time after 1882.

It is still privately owned.
