= St. Julien Ravenel =

Physician and agricultural chemist

- Born: December 15, 1819; Charleston, South Carolina, US
- Died: March 16, 1882 (aged 62); Charleston, South Carolina, US
- Resting place: Magnolia Cemetery
- Occupations: Physician, chemist
- Spouse: Harriott Horry Rutledge
- Children: 9

St. Julien Ravenel (December 15, 1819 – March 16, 1882) was an American medical doctor and agricultural chemist. During the American Civil War, he designed the torpedo boat CSS David that was used to attack the Union ironclad USS New Ironsides. After the war, he helped pioneer the use of fertilizers in agriculture and led the growth of phosphate fertilizer manufacturing in Charleston, South Carolina.

== Early career and family ==
Born in Charleston, South Carolina, St. Julien was the oldest child of merchant and ship owner John Ravenel and his wife, Anna Eliza Ford. After attending grammar schools in Charleston, he left for Morristown, New Jersey, to continue his education. In 1840 he graduated from the Medical College in Charleston after studying medicine under J. E. Holbrook, then continued his studies for a summer in Philadelphia and a year in Paris, France. Returning to Charleston, he began to practice medicine and was named Demonstrator of Anatomy at the Medical College.

Finding medical work distasteful and disliking the drudgery of being a doctor, Ravenel began an association with Professor Louis Agassiz, studying microscopy, natural history, and physiology. When the American Association for the Advancement of Science met in Charleston during 1850, Ravenel was the treasurer.

On March 20, 1851, Ravenel married writer and historian Harriott Horry Rutledge, the daughter of Edward Cotesworth Rutledge and Rebecca Motte Lowndes. Between 1852 and 1872, St. Julien and Harriott had nine children. Their son Francis ("Frank") Gualdo Ravenel married the poet Beatrice Witte.

St. Julien undertook the study of chemistry beginning in 1852, but did not completely forsake his previous work. When an outbreak of yellow fever struck Norfolk, Virginia in 1855, he was one of the first on the scene and worked throughout the epidemic to aid the patients. At his Stony Landing Plantation along the Cooper River, he experimented with the production of lime from marl deposits along the river banks. After cement was discovered under the limestone layers, in 1856 he partnered with Clement H. Stevens to establish the Colleton Lime Works at his plantation which sold lime for $0.90 per barrel. This company provided most of the lime the southern states used during the American Civil War.

== Civil War ==
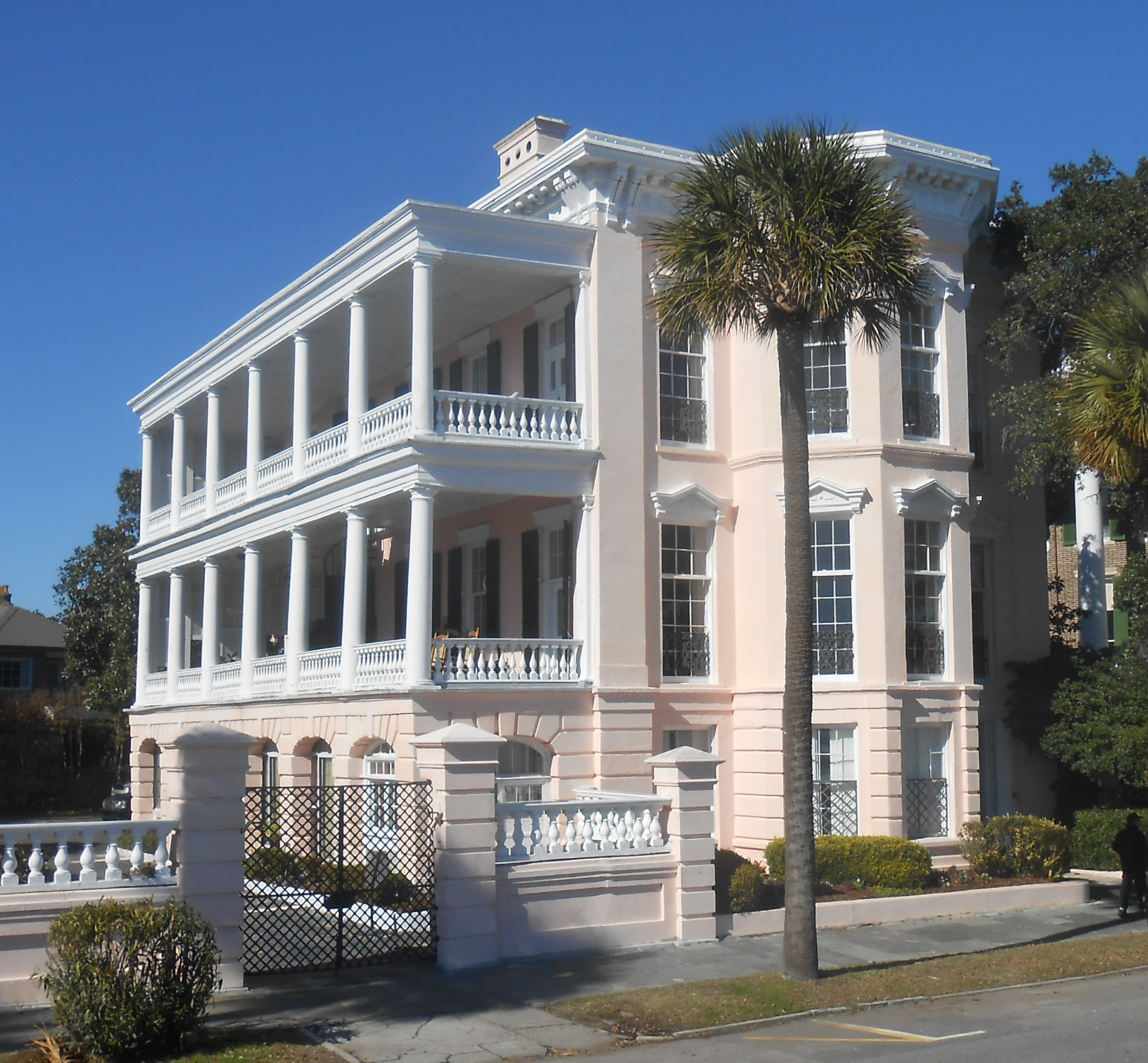
St. Julien Ravenel inherited the house at 5 East Battery in Charleston from his parents and lived there with his family until his death.

With the outbreak of the Civil War in 1861, Ravenel volunteered with the Phoenix rifles and served as a private during the siege of Fort Sumter. Then he was commissioned as a surgeon with the 24th South Carolina Infantry Regiment, under the command of Colonel Clement H. Stevens. In 1862, he was placed in charge of the Confederate Hospital in Columbia, South Carolina, where Confederate soldiers from Virginia and elsewhere were treated.

With the Northern fleet blockading the South's ports, the torpedo boat was devised as a counterblockade weapon. In 1863, the first purpose-built torpedo boat was conceived and built near Charleston with private funding. Using an earlier concept of Ross Winans, Ravenel provided the initial design for the vessel and the construction was completed with the aid of David C. Ebaugh. Named the David, this cigar-shaped, semi-submersible vessel was fitted with a torpedo at the end of 14-foot iron spar mounted at the bow. The idea was to drive the steam-powered boat at an enemy ship and detonate the torpedo along the hull. On October 5, 1863, the CSS David was used to attack the USS New Ironsides near Charleston Harbor, causing damage but failing to breach the hull.

Ravenel's knowledge of chemistry was put to use when he was placed in charge of a laboratory in Columbia that manufactured nearly all of the South's medical supplies, including drugs and medicines. As General William Tecumseh Sherman's army approached, the laboratory was ordered to entrain to North Carolina. Harriott Ravenel stayed behind with their provisions and witnessed the Union army's arrival and the burning of the city.

== Postwar period ==
Before the war, Ravenel had begun experimenting with chemistry to improve agricultural conditions. He resumed this research in 1866, and discovered the benefit of using phosphate of lime in agriculture. He increased the cotton yield in one section of his plantation from 100 to 150 pounds per acre to 300–400 pounds. In August 1867, Ravenel and N. A. Pratt discovered a rich concentration of phosphate in Lambs, South Carolina. As a result, he helped to found the fertilizer manufacturer Wando Phosphate Company. Over time, this led to a burgeoning fertilizer industry that helped the commercial recovery of South Carolina.

For the rest of his career, Ravenel served as chemist to the larger phosphate companies. Among his accomplishments were the development of simpler fertilizer manufacturing techniques, a method of growing abundant short grain and hay on the South Carolina coast, and the boring of artesian wells of moderate depth in the Charleston area to supply water to local manufacturing industries. For the last, he is known as the "father of Charleston's artesian well system". St. Julien Ravenel died of cirrhosis of the liver, March 15, 1882, and was survived by his wife and nine children.

Writing under the pseudonym "H. Hilton Broom", Harriott Ravenel won a Charleston newspaper prize for her 1879 novel Ashurst. She later published Eliza Pinckney (1896), The Life and Times of William Lowndes of South Carolina (1901), and Charleston, the Place and the People (1906).
