= West Point Rice Mill =

- U.S. National Register of Historic Places
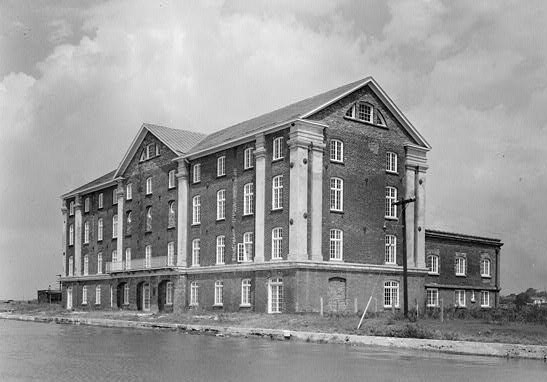
- West Point Rice Mill in 1940

- Location within South Carolina Location within the United States
- Location: City Marina; 17 Lockwood Dr., Charleston, South Carolina
- Coordinates: 32°46′44″N 79°57′4″W
- Built: 1861
- Architect: Delano and Aldrich; Works Progress Administration (1930s renovations)
- NRHP reference No.: 94001569
- Added to NRHP: January 20, 1995

West Point Rice Mill is a former rice mill building in Charleston, South Carolina. It is at the City Marina at 17 Lockwood Drive. West Point Mill was one of three large rice mills in Charleston in the 19th century. This building was constructed in 1861 to replace a rice mill that had burned the previous year. It was named to the National Register of Historic Places on January 20, 1995.

== History ==
In 1840, Jonathan Lucas III built a four-story brick, steam-powered rice mill on the Ashley River. This mill burned on November 20, 1860.

Construction of a new mill began quickly. Although hampered by the Union blockade, the mill was capable of full operation in late 1863. When Charleston was occupied by the Union Army in 1865, the mill was used as a food distribution center. Its neighbour the East Point Rice Mill had been rebuilt in the mid-1840s by engineer James McLaren and the Scottish merchant James Robb. The mill passed to Robb's sons James Jr and William on his death in 1859.

After the Civil War, the mill resumed operations and its production increased. In 1886, it suffered damage from the 1886 Charleston earthquake. Brickwork was damaged and the gables were brought down. At some point before the 1920s, the entire roof was replaced except for the kingposts and trusses.

In 1890, the three Charleston mills produced over 97,000 barrels of rice. Competition from western rice growers and a number of hurricanes caused rice production in South Carolina to fall. In 1888, West Point Mill Company purchased a share of Chisolm's Mill. In 1894, West Point and Bennett's Mill combined and bought Chisolm's Mill, which was closed. Rice production continued to fall. West Point Mill was closed in 1920, and the company began to sell its assets. Around 1925, the mill's steam engine was sold to the Henry Ford Museum. The mill's property was sold to the City of Charleston in 1926.

In 1930, the U.S. Post Office indicated its desire to build a seaplane base for mail service at the site. Although this was never accomplished, it planted the idea of a seaplane terminal at the site.

In 1933, the Civil Works Administration started building the Municipal Yacht Basin. Later that year, the building was leased to American Bagging Company as a depot and warehouse for jute imported for its plant on Meeting Street.

The City of Charleston continued to explore opportunities for using the building as a seaplane terminal. In the spring of that year, flights from Germany to Charleston were proposed. In early 1937, the Works Progress Administration started work to convert the mill building into the James F. Byrnes air terminal. Pan American World Airways hired the New York firm of Delano and Aldrich to plan for a passenger station. Reconstruction efforts were carried out on the exterior and first two floors.

With the start of World War II in Europe, transatlantic service was abandoned. The City competed for a naval seaplane base, but it went to Jacksonville, Florida. The building was occupied by the Charleston District of the Civilian Conservation Corps. In 1941, the building was taken over for the administration of the Charleston Area Inshore Patrol of the Sixth Naval District. In 1946, it became the headquarters for the Sixth Naval District Mine Craft Base. It was used by the U.S. Navy through the 1950s when it was transferred to the U.S. Army Corps of Engineers. From 1966 to around 1986, the Trident Chamber of Commerce was located in the building along with some commercial tenants. After that, the building was again vacant.

In the fall of 1989, the building suffered from a fire with significant damage to an addition. Then Hurricane Hugo damaged the roof. After repairs, it was leased to the Bennett-Hofford Company. Bennett-Hofford performed a $3 million renovation to the building before the structure was added to the National Register, and several offices and restaurants have occupied the building since. The restoration received one of the Preservation Society of Charleston's Carolopolis Awards in 1995.

== Architecture ==
The original building is 142 ft (43 m) long and 42 ft (13 m) wide with a gabled roof. Although it was the largest of the Charleston rice mills, it lacked the architectural detailing of the other two buildings. The Flemish bond brick building is three and one-half stories above ground level. There are eleven bays along the west or Ashley River elevation. The center three bays project slightly forward. It has a Palladian style with stuccoed Doric pilasters demarking the three bays of the main portico on the west elevation and pilasters on the either side of the last bay of both the east and west elevations. There are pairs of pilasters at the end of the north and south elevations. Two-story wings that are 36 ft (11 m) long and 26 ft (8 m) wide extend from the outer bays of the east elevation. The mill had two octagonal smokestacks on its east side.

The earthquake bolts installed in after the earthquake in 1886 are still visible on the building and its wings. The damaged gables were patched with roofing materials.

The renovations starting in 1937 were relatively minor on the exterior and major for the interior. The smokestacks were removed and a new entry was built on the east elevation. The ground level was rebuilt on a concrete slab. The gable brickwork was restored, but the brickwork was poorly matched. Demilune windows were put in the gables. Oculus windows were put in window openings on third level of the central gable on the west side. Cast-stone sills were installed in the first-floor windows. Only the first and second floors were completed.

After 1946, a first floor lobby was constructed in front of the central bays of the west side. This had a balcony on its roof with iron railing. After the 1989 fire, the balcony railing was removed and the west elevation rebuilt with three arched openings.

An elevator was installed in the 1960s on the east side entrance.

After the damage from Hurricane Hugo, the roof was replaced with standing-seam copper. Four shed dormers were added to the west side of the roof.

Additional pictures are available.
