= Beatrice St. Julien Ravenel =

American writer

Beatrice St. Julien Ravenel (October 3, 1904 – December 2, 1990) was an American writer known for her books on the architecture and history of Charleston, South Carolina.

She was the daughter of the poet Beatrice Ravenel and her first husband, Francis 'Frank' Gualdo Ravenel (1869–1920), whose mother was the writer Harriott Horry Ravenel. Frank died in 1920, and in 1926 Beatrice acquired a stepfather, Samuel Prioleau Ravenel, who may have been a distant cousin of her father. Through their common great-great-grandfather Daniel Ravenel (1762–1807), she was a third cousin of the artist Alice Ravenel Huger Smith.

Ravenel graduated from the College of Charleston and went on to become book editor and a reporter for the Charleston News. She lived in Charleston, South Carolina, and in 1945 she published Architects of Charleston to showcase the architecture of both the city and the surrounding low country, partly to encourage local historic preservation efforts; it continues to be much cited. In 1947 she edited Charleston Murders, a collection of articles on murders in the city stretching back to the 18th century. She wrote one of the articles in the anthology.

Ravenel is buried in Magnolia Cemetery in Charleston.

== Selected publications ==
Books

- Architects of Charleston (1945, reissued 1992 by University of South Carolina Press)
- Charleston Murders (as editor, 1947)

Articles

- "The Restoration of the Manigault House" (1942)
- "Lovely Lavinia and the Drunken Hangman" (1947, in Charleston Murders)
