= Twilight Club =

Dinner club in New York City

The Twilight Club was a dinner club in New York City that operated from 1883 until 1904. It was founded by Charles F. Wingate "to cultivate good fellowship and enjoy rational recreation."

== Formation ==
On January 4, 1883, the Twilight Club was founded by Charles Frederick Wingate during "a gathering at Mouquin's restaurant of a number of congenial friends..." Meetings consisted of dinner or discussions both humorous and serious on disputable topics of the day. Some recorded topics were fishing, rearing of children, and the value of a college education. Sometimes the questions would be hypotheticals such as, "what would you do if you were King of Manhattan Island?", or "who is the most remarkable man on earth?"

The inspiration for the club came from a dinner at Delmonico's held to honor sociologist Herbert Spencer on November 9, 1882, prior to his departure from the United States. Herbert Spencer made a speech on this occasion in which he said, "We have had somewhat too much of the Gospel of Work; it is time to preach the Gospel of Relaxation." This motto engendered the formation of the Twilight Club. Herbert Spencer did not participate in the club. However, Charles Wingate offered him an honorary membership, which, upon acceptance, he offered this advice to the club, "I would, however, remark that the reports of your proceedings seem to imply rather more gravity of speech in your conversations than is altogether consistent with the 'expectation of relaxation.'" The official motto of the club was, "To cultivate good fellowship and enjoy rational recreation."

== Membership, principles, and officers ==
By 1884, the Twilight Club was heralded as a hot spot for the “who’s who” of Manhattan. “Among all the clubs in New York, of which prominent men are members, few are better known than the Twilight club, and, at the same time, few are more worthy of note…" trumpeted a local publication.

Rather than formal “Rules,” the Twilight Club had a list of “Principles”:

Principles

- No dues
- No debts
- No by-laws
- No president
- No constitution
- No salaries
- No initiation fee (Note: This principle was not noted in Joel Benton's 1910 biography of the Club)
- No full dress
- No mutual admiration
- No defalcations
- No decamping treasurer
- No watered stock
- No parliamentary rules
- No previous questions
- No lengthy speeches
- No late hours
- No profanity
- No 'fish stories'
- No 'sailors' yarns'
- No dueling
- No free dinners
- No scandal
- No bribery
- No personalities
- No party politics
- No preaching
- No gambling
- No dynamite
- No 'bouncer'
- No conventionality
- No grand reform
- No high ideal
- No 'papers'
- No 'dudes'
- No puns
- No gush
- No cant
- No red tape
- No formality
- No humbug

Additions and amendments were accepted, but they were required to be submitted in writing, along with a deposit of $17.34 (as a guarantee of good faith) two years before being voted on.

There was an executive committee. However, the only officer was Charles F. Wingate, who acted as "secretary, treasurer, committee of admission, and head and doer of what ever was to be done." Wingate kept a complete list of members, which was published in a contemporaneous biography of the club and corroborated in multiple newspaper articles at the time.

While the Club defined its members as "club-able fellows with $1,” specific evenings were designated as "ladies' nights,” where women were invited to attend the dinners and to actively engage in the discussions.

In January 1887, after three years in operation, the Club raised its annual membership dues from $1 to $2 per year and later to $3 per year.

While “full dress was absolutely prohibited,” some guests would nonetheless dress to impress, arriving in full dinner dress.

== Dinners ==
Dinner began promptly at 6 and ran until 8 followed by two and a half hours of intellectual discussion. Speeches were limited to 5 minutes "with the express understanding that each orator will speak his inmost thoughts without hesitation or reserve, and with the perfect assurance of the esteem and good-will of all his listeners." During its most active period, the club met every two weeks, eight months of the year. It was called the Twilight Club because the meetings happened much earlier than other clubs in the city. Meetings could be over before other similar clubs had begun dinner. The low cost, sometimes just the cost of dinner, the early hours and the casual nature of the discussions were unique factors that led to the club's popularity among its members.

The St. Denis Hotel (also referred to as the Hotel St. Denis) became the most common location for gatherings. There was no permanent master of ceremonies. For each dinner, the secretary Charles F. Wingate would appoint one member to be the president for the night. Wingate would inform the temporary president of the program for the evening and coach him in conducting the discussion. The dining party consisted of a mixture of paid members, their guests, and invited experts who were brought in to give their testimony and opinions in reference to the topic of discussion for that evening.

The following is a catalogue of noted gatherings (dates, location, topics, attendees and guest speakers):

- April 1884, D'orville's restaurant in the Mills Building. "How did you make your first dollar? & Fish and Fishing." The dinner was on the 9th floor requiring attendees to climb 215 stairs.
- March 1885, D'Orville's restaurant, "How Should Girls be Trained?". Ideas proposed included allowing girls to play football and abandoning corsets. This meeting, described as 60-odd members, was lampooned in the New York Times saying, "A more reckless display of mingled ignorance and presumption has never been made by any club in this city or elsewhere."
- January 1887, "Where shall we go to church in 1987?".
- January 1888, "What Would you do if you were King of Manhattan Island?" 300 men and women diners in attendance.
- June 1890, "Is it worth while to go to College?", 80 gentlemen attended.
- December 1892, "What shall we do with our slums!".
- January 1893, St. Denis Hotel, "The American Drama", 100 ladies with their escorts attended.
- May 1893, St. Denis Hotel, "Who is the most remarkable man on earth?", 52 members present. They lauded Grover Cleveland, Otto von Bismarck, Kaiser Wilhelm, Pope Leo XIII.
- May 14, 1894, on board the steamship Paris. The 234th dinner, 400 attending. The topic "Men and Their Wives" was met with "hearty applause" and laughter. Serious talk of American commerce and shipping followed.
- December 1894, St. Denis Hotel. "Is the theater going to the dogs?", 18 members of the American Dramatists' Club invited as guest speakers.
- December 1894, St. Denis Hotel, "What are the churches doing for the people?", Guest speaker: Miss Ballington Booth, 200 women and men present.
- April 1896, St. Denis Hotel, "The Cuban question.", 150 members and guests attended, Guest speakers: 2 NY businessmen of Cuban descent.
- December 1896, St. Denis Hotel, "The ethics of the bargain counter." Guest speaker: a member of the Union Labor League.
- January 1897, St. Denis Hotel, "As others see us."
- February 1897, St. Denis Hotel, "The problem of luxury - Shall we drink champagne or beer?"
- October 1897, St. Denis Hotel, The upcoming election was the topic. 90 club members attended.
- January 1901, St. Denis Hotel, "The record of the century."
- May 1901, "Tenement House Laws." Guest speakers: Social Reform Club & Sanitary Protective League.
- November 1901, St. Denis Hotel, Discussed what they would do if they were mayor-elect. 30 members attended.
- November 1904, St. Denis Hotel, Discussed whether Russia or Japan should be given sympathy in the present Far Eastern storm. Guest Speaker: Poultney Bigelow.

== Demise ==
Club meetings ended in the early 1900s with the last reported meeting in 1904. In 1910, Joel Benton recounts that, "The Club has held no gatherings of late years, on account of its founder's now fatally terminated illness" and "The Club, beginning in 1883, suspended 5 or 6 years ago." Waters said, "But alas! Wingate is absent, and there is no one to replace him." When Charles Wingate Died in 1909, he was noted as the founder of the Twilight Club, and its factotum. The club lasted over twenty years and hosted hundreds of dinners with guests numbering from dozens to several hundred. The last public meeting of the Twilight Club was May 19, 1918. By a unanimous vote at the annual meeting in September, the Twilight Club officially became the Society of Arts and Sciences.

=== Manhattan Athletic Club ===
In 1893, the Manhattan Athletic Club went into receivership. Charles Wingate and a consortium of Twilight Club Members raised $500,000 to purchase the building as a permanent home for the club. They also intended to rent the club to other similar social clubs that could benefit from such a meeting place. While dues had been raised from $1 to $2, at the time of the athletic club purchase, Wingate mentions the initiation fee of $100 and dues of $15, which is contrasted with the dues of $30 for a similar club in London. At the time the club reported 800 members, although attendance at dinners was reported as between 50 and 200, depending on the event. The Twilight Club hoped to increase membership to 1,500 with this purchase. However, no record of a purchase or such club operations was recorded. The only noted use in this time period was for conducting boxing matches. The Twilight Club continued to have dinners mainly at the St. Denis Hotel following discussions of this purchase.

=== Twilight Park ===
Twilight Park in the Catskill region of New York state was founded by Charles F. Wingate. Besides the name and a handful of Twilight Club members purchasing property there, it had no connection to the Twilight Club and its operations.
