= Villa Margherita (Charleston, South Carolina) =

Historic house in Charleston, South Carolina

Coordinates: 32.770377°N 79.929251°W

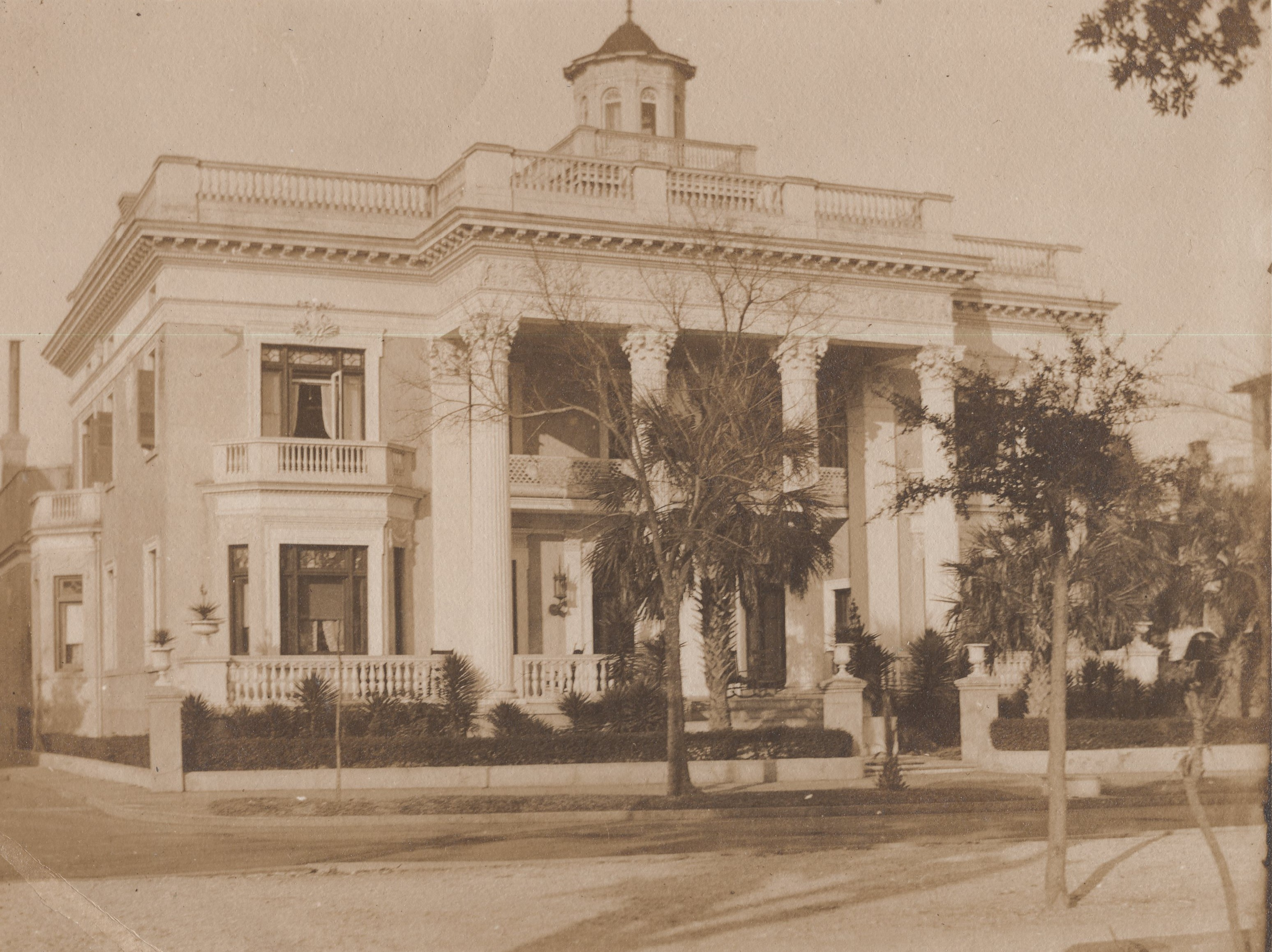
The house was just over 20 years old when photographed in 1915.

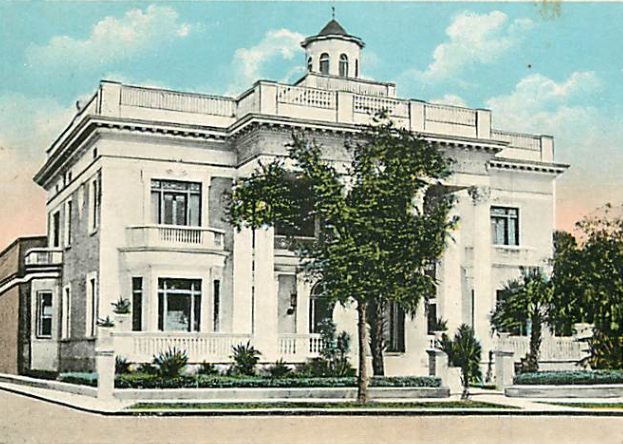
The Villa Margherita was used as a hotel in 1921 when it was featured on a Charleston postcard.

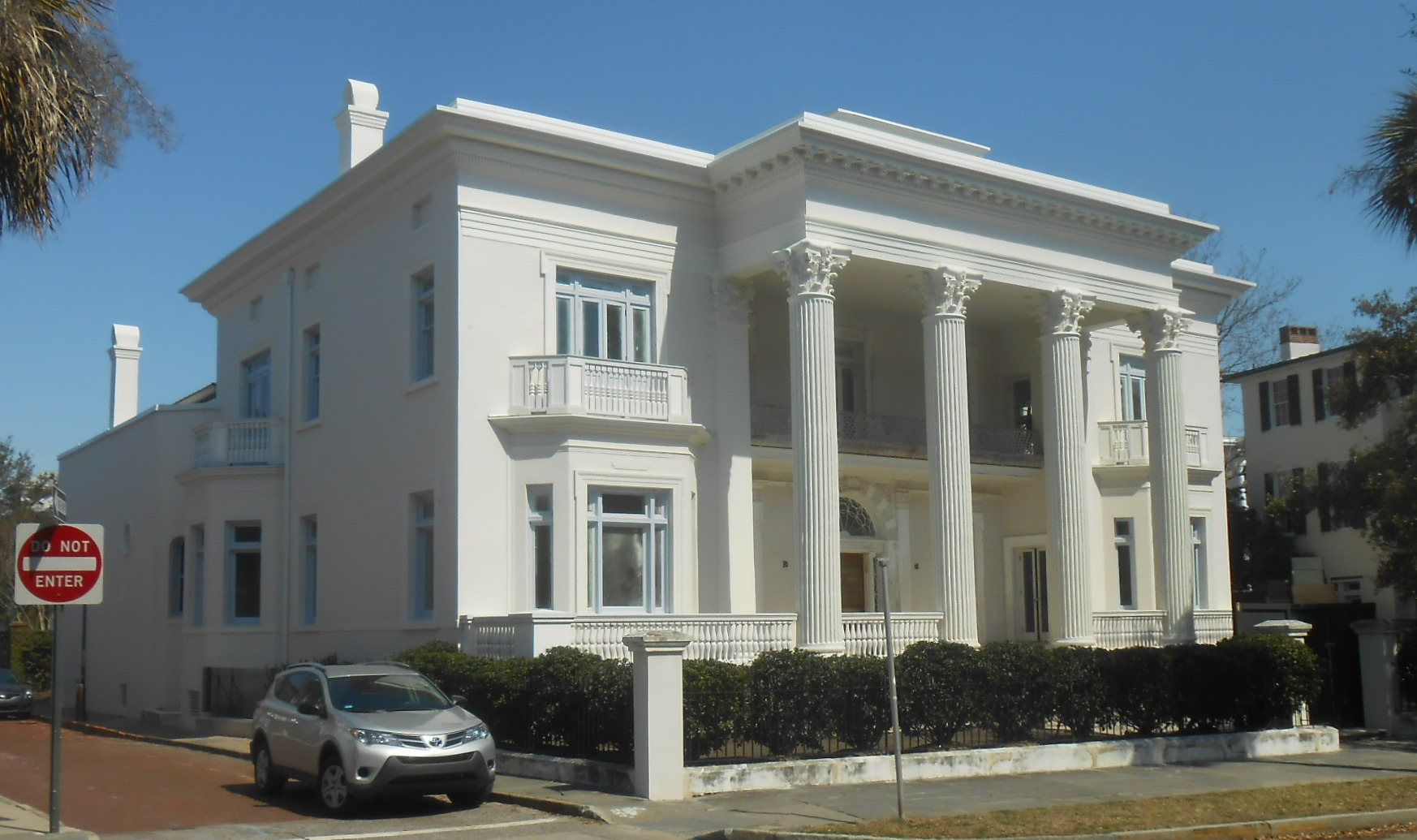
In 2013, the Villa Margherita was restored, although the work did not include returning the balustrade and cupola to the roof.

The Villa Margherita is an Italian Renaissance house at 4 South Battery, Charleston, South Carolina. It was built in 1892 and early 1893 for Andrew Simonds. The house is made of brick with a Portland cement coating according to the plans of the architect, Frederick P. Dinkelberg. The decorative work on the four Corinthian columns and the frieze on the front was executed by the Morrison Brothers of New York City. The entrance of the house features a large atrium with a fountain.

Between 1905 and 1953, the house served as a hotel. During that use, guests included William Howard Taft, Grover Cleveland, and Theodore Roosevelt. Sinclair Lewis was a guest at the hotel, where he completed the manuscript for Main Street. In 1935, author Gertrude Stein and her partner Alice B. Toklas spent Valentine's Day at the Villa Margherita during Stein's American tour. From 1943 to 1946, the United Seaman's Service leased the hotel and rented rooms to seamen and their families. In 1961, James and Mary Wilson bought the house. Their daughter, Mary Wilson, sold it for $3 million to Stephen and Mary Hammond in September 2012.
