= Beatrice Ravenel =

American poet (1870–1956)

Beatrice Witte Ravenel
- Born: Beatrice Witte; August 24, 1870; Charleston, South Carolina, U.S.
- Died: March 15, 1956 (aged 85)
- Education: Charleston Female Seminary
- Alma mater: Radcliffe College
- Occupation: Poet
- Spouse(s): (1) Francis 'Frank' Gualdo Ravenel (1900-1920); (2) Samuel Prioleau Ravenel (1926-1940)
- Children: Beatrice St. Julien Ravenel
- Writing career
- Movement: Charleston Renaissance

Beatrice Witte Ravenel (August 24, 1870 – March 15, 1956) was an American poet associated with the Charleston Renaissance in South Carolina.

== Early life ==
Beatrice Witte was born in Charleston, South Carolina, on August 24, 1870, the third of six daughters of Charlotte Sophia (Reeves) Witte, who was of French Huguenot descent, and Charles Otto Witte, a German-born banker and businessman. In her teens, her family lived in a house that is now the Ashley Hall school.

She showed early intellectual promise and was educated at the Charleston Female Seminary. In 1889, she went on to study at the women's annex of Harvard University, the Society for Collegiate Instruction of Women (shortly to be renamed Radcliffe College). She remained there for five years and was active in literary circles, publishing poetry in The Harvard Advocate (a literary magazine), and stories in The Harvard Monthly, of which she subsequently became an editor. She also published her poems and stories in Scribner's Magazine, the Chap-Book Magazine, the Literary Digest, and other magazines of the day.

In 1900 she married Francis 'Frank' Gualdo Ravenel, whose mother was the writer Harriott Horry Ravenel. They had a daughter, Beatrice St. Julien Ravenel, who would go on to become a writer on architecture and Charleston history. The couple lived south of Charleston, initially supported mainly by the fortune left to Ravenel by her father, and during this period Ravenel wrote little.

Ravenel's husband died in 1920, and in 1926 she remarried. Her second husband was Samuel Prioleau Ravenel, a second cousin of her first husband.

== Writing ==
Ravenel took up writing poetry again in the late 1910s, but she only returned to writing full-time out of necessity after Frank's death, by which time little of her inheritance was left due to his bad investments. Ravenel supported herself and her daughter by writing fiction for publications like Harper's Magazine, the Saturday Evening Post, and Ainslee's Magazine. ""The High Cost of Conscience"", a story she wrote in this period was republished as an O. Henry Memorial Prize story. She also wrote editorials for newspapers edited by her brother-in-law William Watts Ball, including The State and the Post and Courier.

Ravenel originally wrote poems in a late Victorian sentimental mode, but after exposure to modernist—and especially Imagist—poets in the early 1920s through her founding membership in the South Carolina Poetry Society, she began writing a dramatically different kind of free verse notable for its vivid imagery and precise language. She became a friend of such modernist poets as Amy Lowell, who advised her on the sole book of poems published in her lifetime, The Arrow of Lightning (1926). She published her poems in Poetry and Contemporary Verse magazines, the North American Review, the Sewanee Review, and elsewhere. By the late 1920s, she had published some 50 short stories and 80 poems in various outlets.

Some of Ravenel's best poetry was inspired by the South Carolina Lowcountry where she lived, especially the lives of the local Yemasee Indians. One critic notices that although she evokes history like many of the Charleston Renaissance writers, it is not in the typical nostalgizing vein for a lost antebellum world; instead, she insistently gives voice to those forgotten by history: Native Americans, soldiers, mothers, pirates, slaves. Several authors hold her work to be superior to that of her better-known peers. Literary scholar Louis D. Rubin, Jr., who edited a 1969 volume of her works, wrote that her work was "better than any other poetry being written in the South during the 1920s outside of Nashville." Her obscurity may be due in part to her own withdrawal from writing and in part due to a general neglect of southern women writers by literary scholars. Recent scholarship places her as a key literary figure in the Charleston Renaissance, along with fellow writers Josephine Pinckney, Julia Peterkin, DuBose Heyward, Dorothy Heyward, and Hervey Allen.

== Later life ==
Ravenel's second marriage (in 1926) brought her renewed financial stability. She traveled widely and wrote little, though she did produce one sequence on the West Indies that was only published long after her death.

Ravenel died on March 15, 1956, sixteen years after Samuel. Her papers—including manuscripts, letters, scrapbooks, and sketchbooks—are held by the University of North Carolina.

== Publications ==
- The Arrow of Lightning (1926)
- The Yemasee Lands (1969; ed. Louis D. Rubin, Jr.)
