= Vernon Howe Bailey =

American artist (1874–1953)

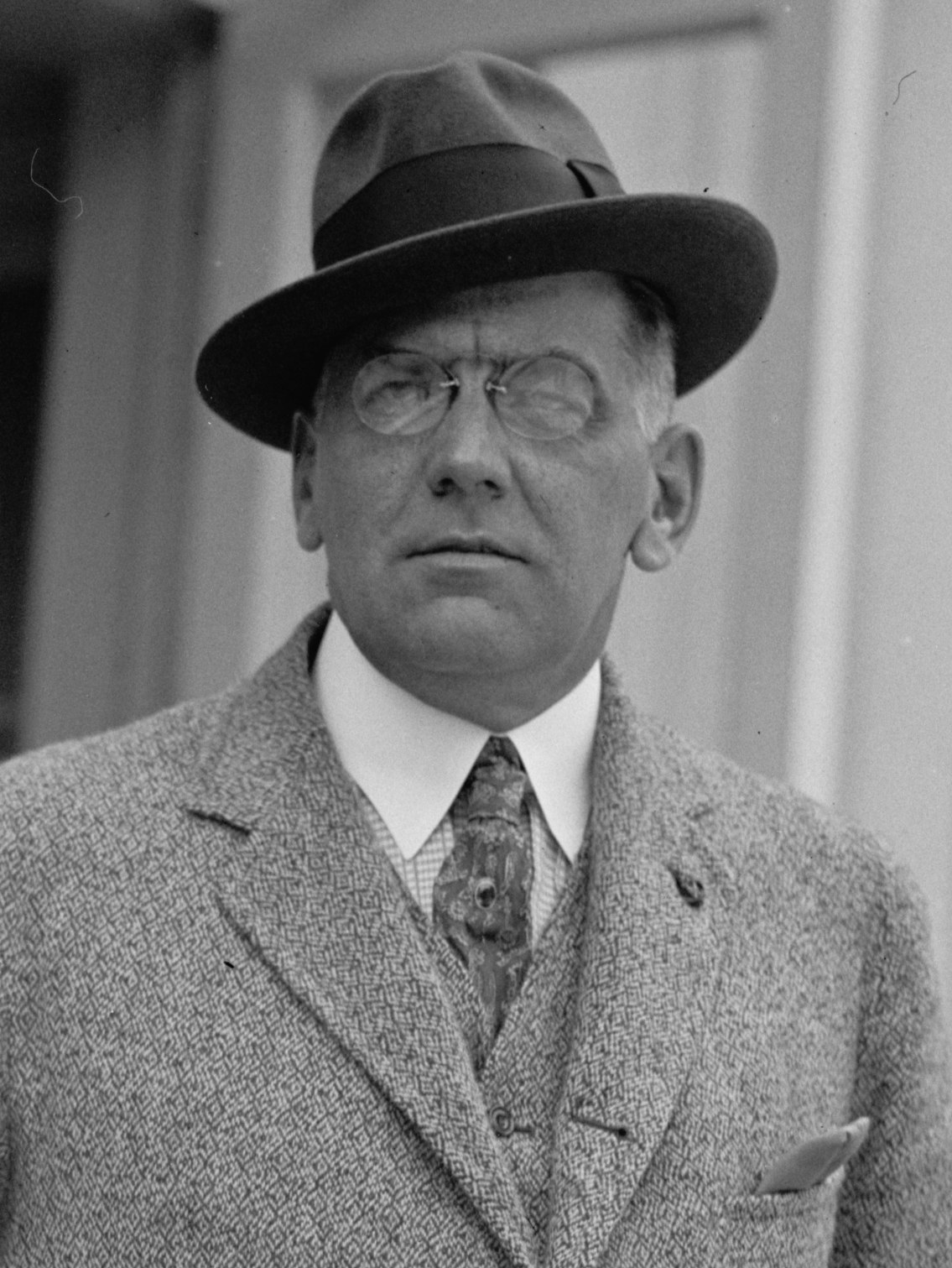
- Bailey in 1924
- Born: Vernon Howe Bailey; April 1, 1874; Camden, New Jersey
- Died: October 27, 1953 (aged 79); New York, New York
- Known for: Illustration, painting

Vernon Howe Bailey (April 1, 1874 in Camden, New Jersey–October 27, 1953) was an American artist. After undertaking art studies, he was a staff member at The Philadelphia Times and the Boston Herald. He also contributed to publications including Scribner's and Harper's.

== Biography ==
At the age of 15, Bailey became a student at the Pennsylvania Museum School of Industrial Art in Philadelphia. A year later one of his drawings of flowers was accepted for the annual exhibition of the Pennsylvania Academy of the Fine Arts where he later studied. In addition to these schools he also had the chance to study at Royal College of Art, London; Académie Delécluse, and Académie Bilouil, Paris, France. Deciding that “he wanted to see great events and make pictures of them,” he joined the art staff of The Philadelphia Times in 1892 and two years later went to The Boston Herald. He found plenty of action for his pencil in the life of the city-crime, court trials, fires, and shipwrecks-and in the political conventions of 1900."

"From 1892-1901 he was a staff artist on the Philadelphia Times and the Boston Herald, to later contribute to Scribner's, Harper's, The Century, Everybody's and other leading, The Harper's Weekly, Leslies Weekly and Colliers. Throughout this experience he had to travel extensively. In 1902 he represented the Boston Herald as special artist at the coronation of King Edward VII and Queen Alexandra in London. Then in 1907 he visited Paris, London, Italy, and Germany as a special staff artist for Harper's Magazine. Upon the entry of the United States into World War I in 1917, Bailey was the first artist authorized to make drawings of navy yards, gun shops and munition plants." "The drawings that he did were later published and exhibited in art museums widely and won Bailey the Official Thanks of Josephus Daniel the former Secretary of the Navy." These drawings were later acquired by the Smithsonian Institution and a set of prints was installed in the French War Museum, Paris."

After this expedition, Bailey traveled extensively throughout Spain. He completed his tour in 1921, after traveling cities and small towns all over the country capturing the landscapes and scenes in watercolors and drawings. In 1925 he did another Spanish tour and later this collection of 150 drawings was turned into a published book, "Little Known Towns of Spain." This book received a great amount of attention in addition to the royal decree of thanks from King Alphonso XIII of Spain. Within the book was the following write-up:

"At a meeting, in Paris, of Agnacio Zuloaga and Vernon Howe Bailey, Senor Zuloga having highly complimented Mr. Bailey on his work in Spain said, “But when I saw your book of watercolors and drawings of Spain, I was angry with you, for you have disclosed to the world the names of Spanish towns of which I hoped it would never learn, for the tourists will spoil them and gone will be their true character, and the life and the old costumes I have loved to paint will have vanished. Within fifteen years Spain will have been spoiled for me.” For with adventuresome spirit and disregarding the hardships of primitive modes of travel and the meagre accommodations of small inns, Vernon Howe Bailey had struck out from customary main travelled roads, to investigate and picture whatever those remote, delectable, and unsung towns of the back-country might disclose for his pencil. The drawings and paintings of Vernon Howe Bailey have been well-known for many years through publication in leading magazines and exhibition in museums. Their Individuality and distinctive character have won the high approval of critics and connoisseurs of this country and Europe. Having travelled extensively in the United States, England, France, Germany and Italy, Bailey seeking fresh subjects, decided in 1921 to see Spain, where during the summer of that year he made a considerable tour, visiting its largest cities and some provincial capitals and smaller towns. Spain captivated him, and each day was devoted to expressing the varied subjects and medieval atmosphere of some thirty towns. How well he succeeded was attested by the purchase of his entire collection of one hundred and fifty drawings by the Hispanic Society of America for the permanent collections of its museum in New York; and he was elected a corresponding member of that Society. To the delights of Spain's smaller towns, Bailey was particularly responsive, causing him to resolve that one day he would return and visit more of them. This he did several years later, when by such means of transportation as was readily at hand-primitive motor buses, great two-wheeled mule carts, and at times astride a burro - he went far into the interior to towns often difficult of access. His wanderings having begun in Catalonia, led southward into the provinces of central Spain, to the Mediterranean and down that coast into Murcia and across Granada to the far westerly province of Estremadura, bordering the Portuguese frontier, thence into northern Spain and back to his starting point, making an almost complete circuit of the country. This long period of travel represented intensive work in forty more towns, and it is they, their castle-crowned heights, their cathedrals, palaces, plazas, and bridges which compose his present exhibition. His Excellency Merry del Val, former Spanish Ambassador to Great Britain wrote of this collection of Mr. Bailey's work, “It tells more of Spain and her spirit than a hundred volumes.” During his exhibition in Madrid, under the auspices of the Duke of Alba, His Majesty Alfonso XIII attended the exhibition and honored Mr. Bailey with a Royal Decree of Thanks in appreciation of his work in Spain; further recognition was evidenced in his election as a corresponding member in the distinguished Royal Academy of Fine Arts of San Fernando, Madrid, the fourth American to be so honored. The Old Spain is passing and, as Zuloaga predicts, will soon have vanished, but in these watercolors and drawings its ancient and highly picturesque towns will remain, vividly recorded. In anticipation of an extended sojourn abroad, the collection at hand has been entrusted to these Galleries by Mr. Bailey, who has made it possible for the works included to be offered at prices far lower than previously. On Tuesday afternoon, January 5, the opening day of the exhibition, Mr. Bailey will give an informal talk on his roamings in those fascinating and unexploited towns, whose charm his pencil has caught forever. The exhibition will continue until the 23rd of January."

Bailey's special subjects were city streets, landscapes, buildings, and maritime scenes in Europe and America. The best known of his drawings are his sketches in pencil of London, his watercolor and drawings of Spain and his drawings of skyscrapers in New York City. Bailey was the first artist privileged by the United States government on the declaration of war to make drawings of navy yards, munition factories, and other centres of war work, as mentioned. These drawings appeared in exhibitions and were published in the leading magazines throughout the country. The collections he created in Spain were later bought by The Hispanic Society, and were shown in the Musée de la Guerre of France contains a collection of lithographs of American war subjects. Besides his work as a newspaper artist in London and America, Bailey illustrated many books.

He was appointed to a post with the U.S. Navy in 1941 to sketch its facilities, and by August, 1942 he had already sketched “every major shipyard and air station along the Atlantic coast from Maine to Florida." In New Orleans, he sketched the Higgins Boat Yard and Algiers Naval Station. In 1917, he also did about 100 sketches of naval activities, with the Navy's cooperation but not under its direction, sketches "now at the Smithsonian." Prior to New Orleans in 1942, he had also sketched a number of British ships in American ports, including the Duke of York, a British submarine, and several British battleships and aircraft carriers. This was his second sketching trip to New Orleans: in 1906 he made eight Vieux Carre & levee sketches for a local magazine. While sketching in New Orleans in 1942, he stayed at the Hotel Monteleone in the French Quarter.

Once returning to the United States the series of lithograph studies of New York skyscrapers in 1927 that Bailey did were later exhibited in London under the patronage of the Dutchess of Rutland. "After exhibition in London, the drawings were taken to the National Library and Museums in Madrid under the auspices of the Duke of Alba. The exhibition was opened by King Alfonso XIII, who issued him a Royal Decree of Thanks, and he was elected a Corresponding Member of the Royal Academy of Find Arts of San Fernando."

Another significant moment in Bailey's life was the time when he had the chance to be the only artist permitted to produce a comprehensive collection of drawings of the Pope's private apartments. This project took Bailey a year and during this amazing experience he was able to choose whatever composition and subject he wanted. He created over 100 watercolors and drawings. Later the collection was exhibited in the American Art Association-Anderson Galleries in New York.

== Gallery ==
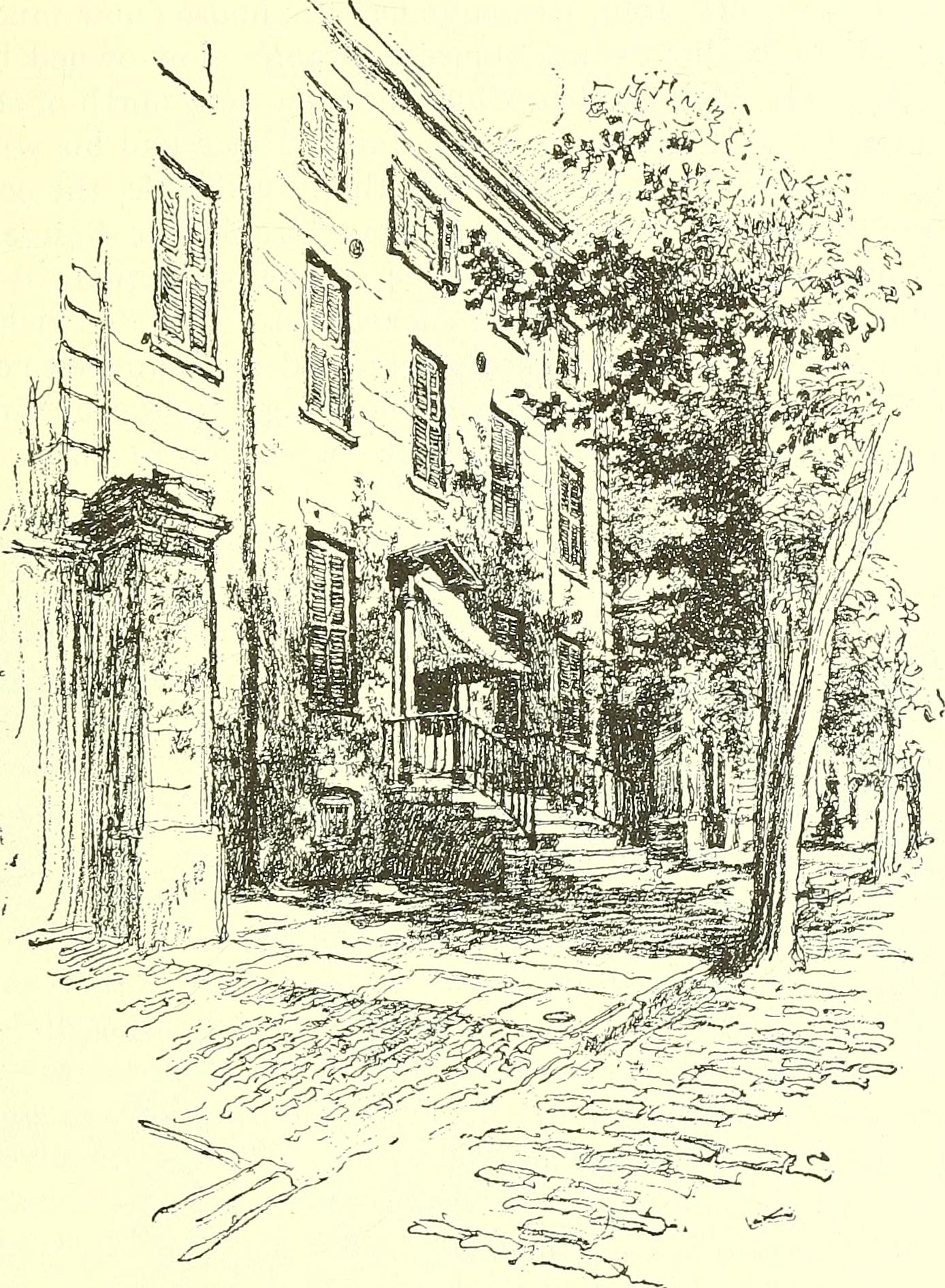
The William Huger House, Charleston, South Carolina

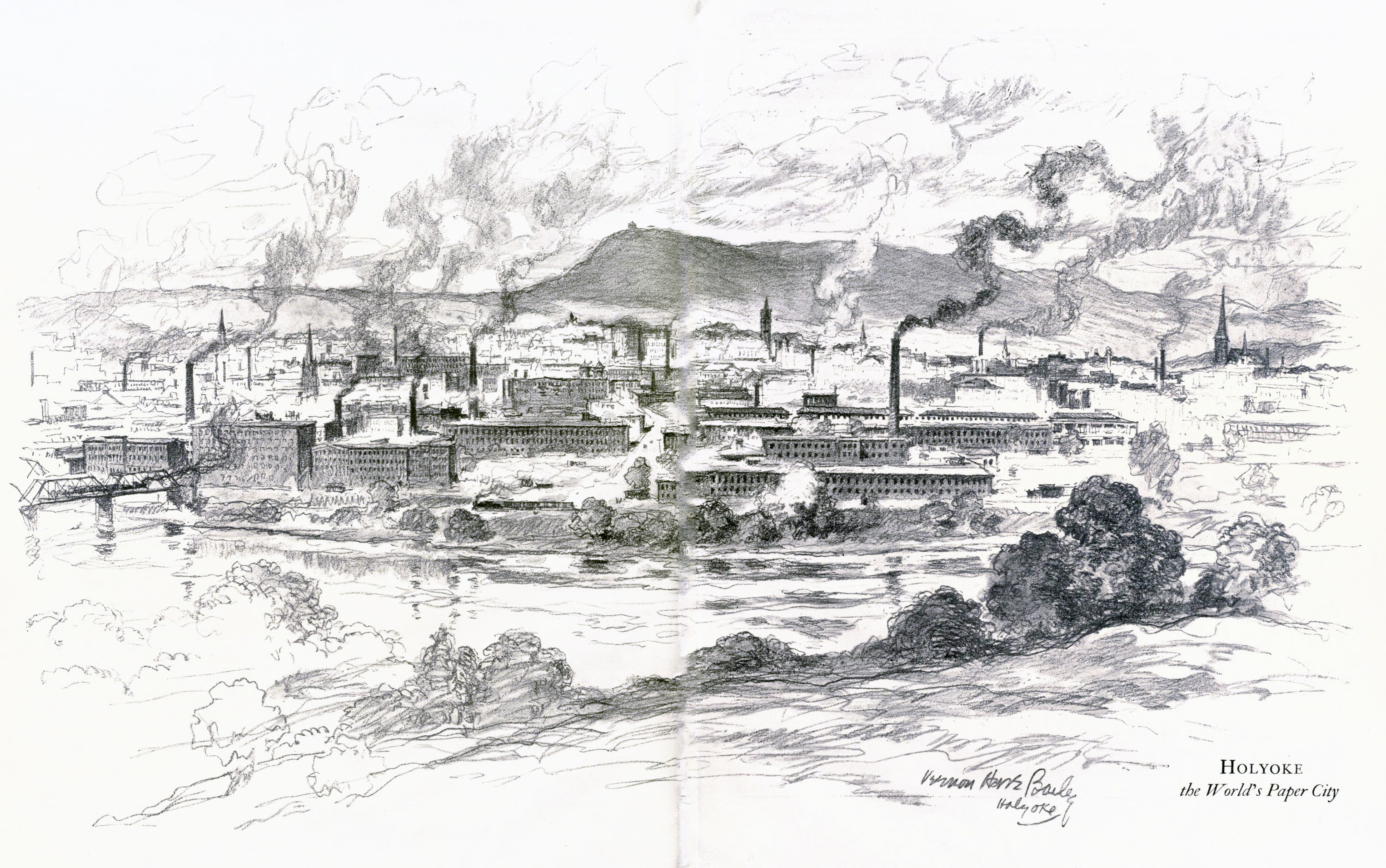
Holyoke, the World's Paper City

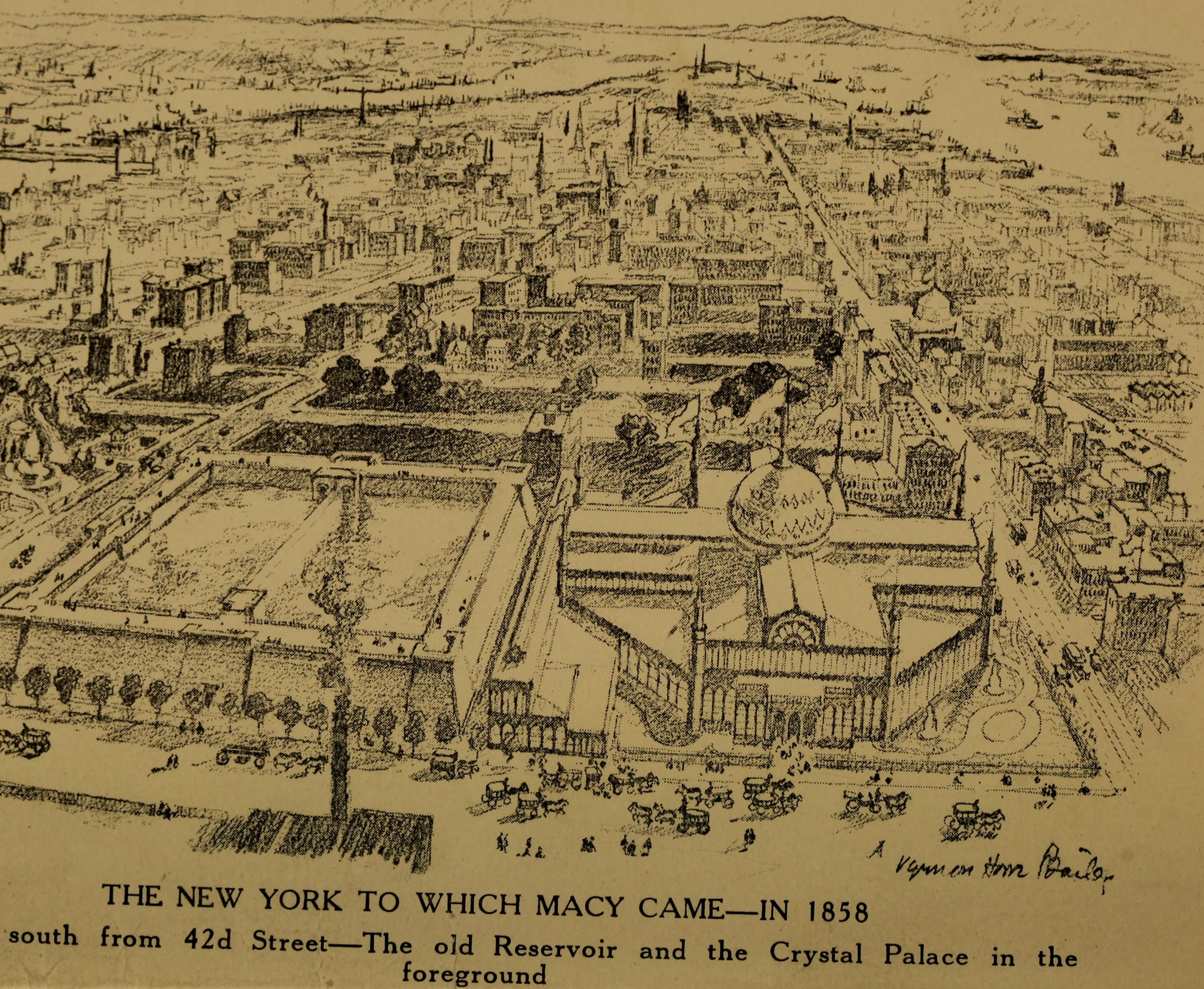
The New York to Which Macy Came

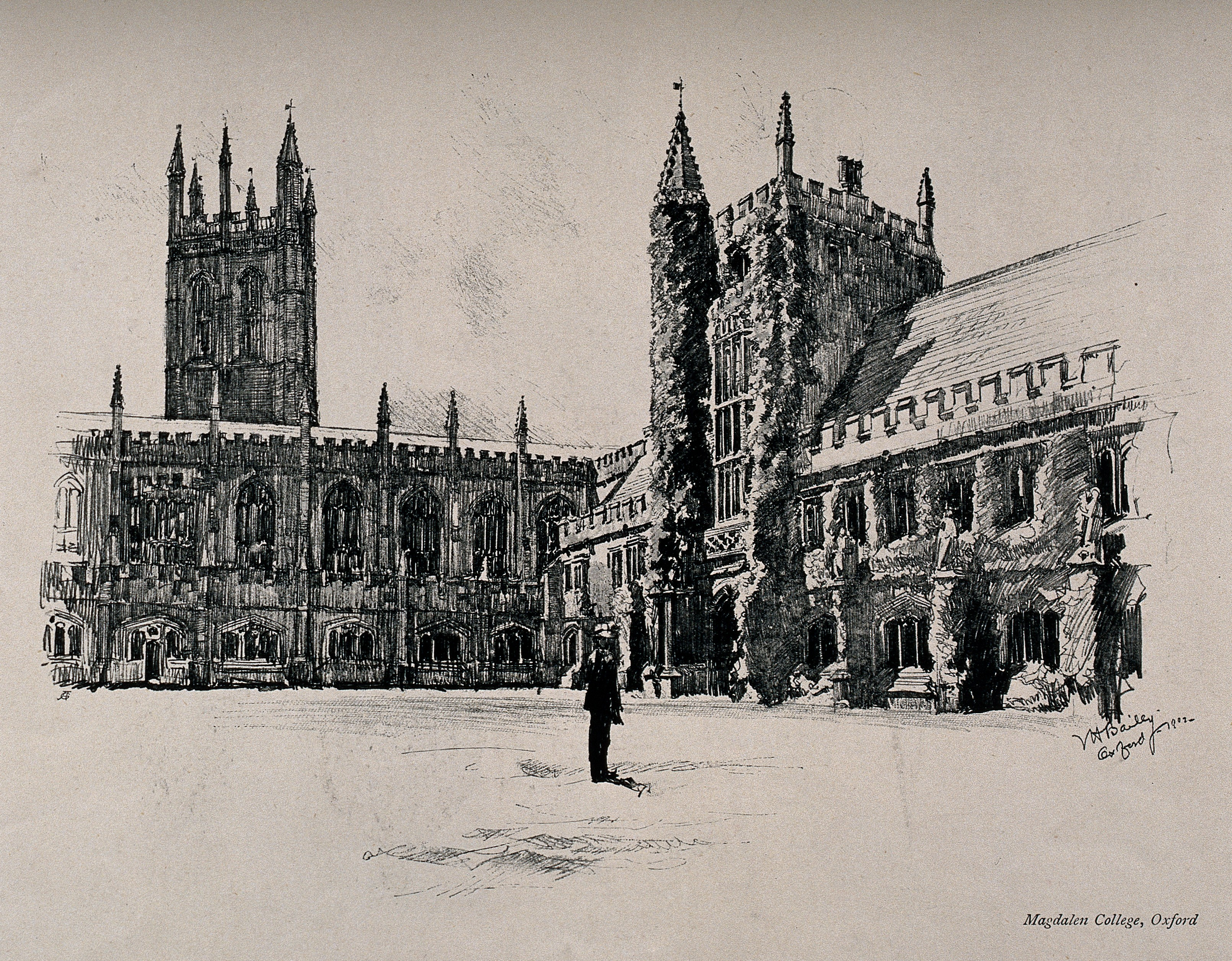
Magdalen College, at Oxford University
