= William Ravenel House =

Coordinates: 32.770996°N 79.928414°W

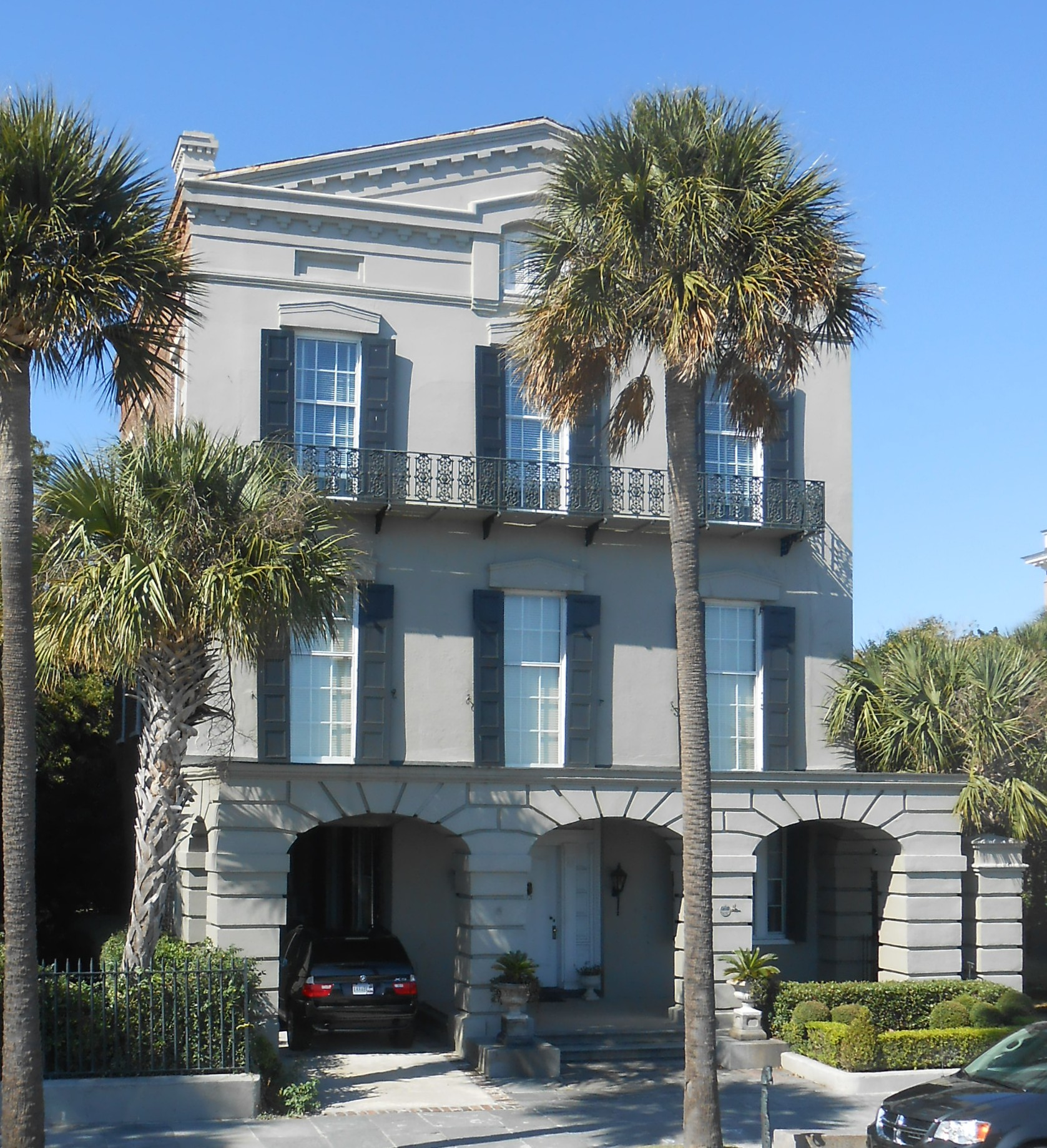
The William Ravenel House at 13 East Battery, Charleston, South Carolina

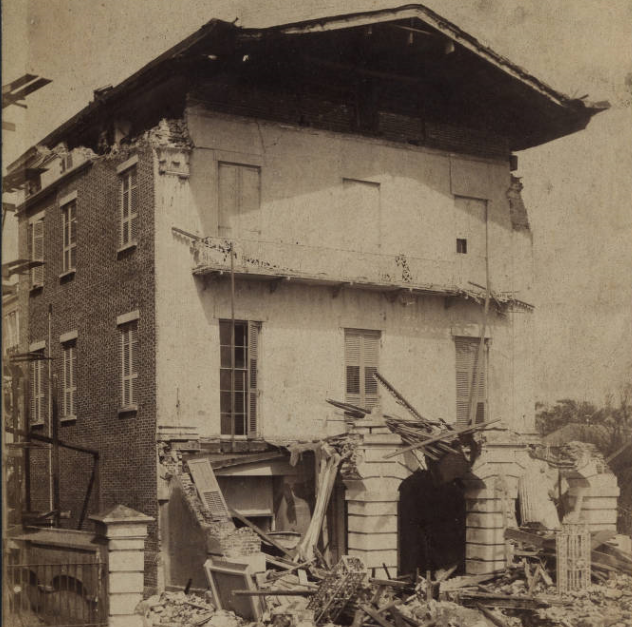
The Earthquake of 1886 severely damaged 13 East Battery.

The William Ravenel House is an historic house in Charleston, South Carolina, United States.

== History ==
The house was built in 1845 by shipping merchant William Ravenel. The drawing room runs the entire width of the house and is perhaps the largest drawing room in Charleston.

The house suffered severe damage in the 1886 Charleston earthquake; its giant order Tower of the Winds portico was destroyed, leaving only the base. One of the capitals from the columns was unearthed 73 years later when Hurricane Gracie felled a tree which had grown atop the capital where it had fallen and been imbedded in the soft soil.

It remains privately owned.
