= Kettell =

Kettell is a surname. Notable people with the surname include:

- John Kettell (c. 1639-c. 1676 or 1685 or c. 1690), early settler in Massachusetts
- Ralph Kettell (1563-1643), English college head
- Samuel Kettell (1800-1855), American author
- Thomas Kettell (1811-1878), American political economist, editor and author
