= Origins of the American Civil War =

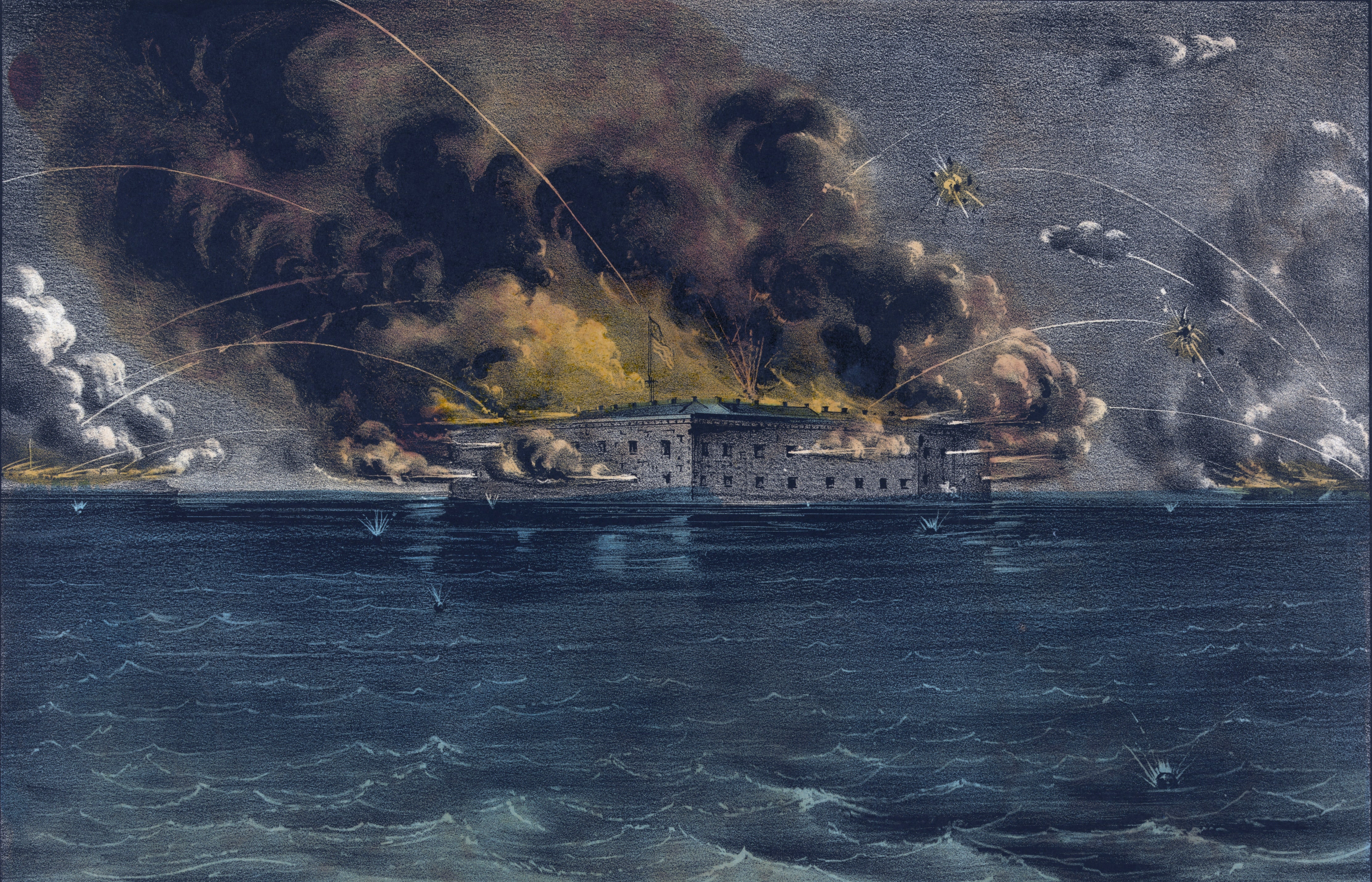
Battle of Fort Sumter, the first hostilities of the war, as depicted by Currier and Ives

Mississippi Secession Convention (1861)

The origins of the American Civil War were rooted in the desire of the Southern states to preserve and expand the institution of slavery. Historians in the 21st century overwhelmingly agree on the centrality of slavery in the conflict, but they disagree on the North's reasons for refusing to allow the Southern states to secede. The negationist Lost Cause ideology denies that slavery was the principal cause of the secession, a view disproven by historical evidence, including the seceding states' own secession documents. After leaving the Union, Mississippi issued a declaration stating, "Our position is thoroughly identified with the institution of slavery—the greatest material interest of the world."

Background factors in the run up to the Civil War were partisan politics, abolitionism, nullification versus secession, Southern and Northern nationalism, expansionism, economics, and modernization in the antebellum period. As a panel of historians emphasized in 2011, "while slavery and its various and multifaceted discontents were the primary cause of disunion, it was disunion itself that sparked the war."

Abraham Lincoln won the 1860 presidential election as an opponent of the extension of slavery into the U.S. territories. His victory triggered declarations of secession by seven slave states of the Deep South, all of whose riverfront or coastal economies were based on cotton that was cultivated by slave labor. They formed the Confederate States of America after Lincoln was elected in November 1860 but before he took office in March 1861. Nationalists in the North and "Unionists" in the South refused to accept the declarations of secession. No foreign government ever recognized the Confederacy. The refusal of the U.S. government, under President James Buchanan, to relinquish its forts that were in territory claimed by the Confederacy proved to be a major turning point leading to war. The war itself began on April 12, 1861, when Confederate forces bombarded the Union's Fort Sumter in the harbor of Charleston, South Carolina.

== Slavery ==
Disagreements between slave states and free states were the main cause of disunion and the war. Most scholars identify preserving slavery as the central reason for the Southern states' decisions to secede. The legal institution of human chattel slavery, comprising the enslavement primarily of Africans and African Americans, was prevalent in the United States of America from its founding in 1776 until 1865, predominantly in the South. Under the law, children were born into slavery, and an enslaved person was treated as property that could be bought, sold, or given away. By the time of the American Revolutionary War (1775–1783), enslaved people had been institutionalized as a racial caste associated with African ancestry.

Slavery had been controversial during the framing of the Constitution in 1787, which, because of compromises, ended up with proslavery and antislavery features. The issue had confounded the nation since its inception and increasingly separated the US into a slaveholding South and a free North. The issue was exacerbated by the country's rapid territorial expansion, which repeatedly brought the question of whether new territory should be slaveholding or free. The issue had dominated politics for decades. Attempts to resolve the matter included the Missouri Compromise and Compromise of 1850, but these only postponed the showdown over slavery that would lead to the war. In his second inaugural address in 1865, Lincoln stated:

"Slaves constituted a peculiar and powerful interest. All knew that this interest was, somehow, the cause of the war. To strengthen, perpetuate, and extend this interest was the object for which the insurgents would rend the Union, even by war; while the government claimed no right to do more than to restrict the territorial enlargement of it."

Motivations of supporters on both sides were not uniform; some Northern soldiers were indifferent to slavery, but a pattern emerged. As the war dragged on, more Unionists supported slavery's abolition, either to cripple the Confederacy or on moral grounds. Confederate soldiers fought to protect a Southern society of which slavery was an integral part. Opponents of slavery considered it an anachronistic evil incompatible with republicanism. The strategy of the anti-slavery forces was containment—to stop the expansion of slavery and thereby put it on a path to extinction. The slaveholding interests in the South denounced this as infringing upon their constitutional rights. With large parts of the Southern population in slavery, white Southerners believed the emancipation of slaves would destroy Southern families, society, and the South's economy, with large amounts of capital invested in slaves and longstanding fears of a free black population. Many Southerners feared a repeat of the 1804 Haitian massacre, when former slaves murdered most of Haiti's white population after the successful slave revolution. Historian Thomas Fleming points to the historical phrase "a disease in the public mind" used by critics of this idea and proposes it contributed to the segregation in the Jim Crow era following emancipation. These fears were exacerbated by the 1859 attempt by John Brown to instigate an armed slave rebellion in the South.

== Differences in population ==
By the mid-19th century the United States had become a nation of two distinct regions. The free states in New England, the Northeast, and the Midwest had a rapidly growing economy based on family farms, industry, mining, commerce, and transportation, with a large and rapidly growing urban population. Their growth was fed by a high birth rate and large numbers of European immigrants, especially from Ireland and Germany. The South was dominated by a settled plantation system based on slavery; there was some rapid growth taking place in the Southwest (e.g., Texas), based on high birth rates and high migration from the Southeast; there was also immigration by Europeans, but in much smaller number. The heavily rural South had few cities of any size, and little manufacturing except in border areas such as St. Louis and Baltimore. Slave owners controlled politics and the economy, although about 75% of white Southern families owned no slaves.

Overall, the Northern population was growing much more quickly than the Southern population, which made it increasingly difficult for the South to dominate the national government. By the time of the 1860 election, the heavily agricultural Southern states as a group had fewer Electoral College votes than the rapidly industrializing Northern states. Abraham Lincoln was able to win the 1860 presidential election without even being on the ballot in ten Southern states. Southerners felt a loss of federal concern for Southern pro-slavery political demands, and their continued domination of the federal government was threatened. This political calculus provided a very real basis for Southerners' worry about the relative political decline of their region, due to the North growing much faster in terms of population and industrial output.

== Historical tensions and compromises ==
=== Early Republic ===
1861 United States Secession Crisis map: States that seceded before April 15, 1861 States that seceded after April 15, 1861 States that permitted slavery, but did not secede States of the Union that banned slavery U.S. territories, under Union Army control

At the time of the American Revolution, the institution of slavery was firmly established in the American colonies. It was most important in the six southern states from Maryland to Georgia, but the total of a half million slaves were spread out through all of the colonies. In the South, 40 percent of the population was made up of slaves, and as Americans moved into Kentucky and the rest of the southwest, one-sixth of the settlers were slaves. By the end of the Revolutionary War, the New England states provided most of the American ships that were used in the foreign slave trade, while most of their customers were in Georgia and the Carolinas.

No serious national political movement against slavery developed, largely due to the overriding concern over achieving national unity. When the Constitutional Convention met, slavery was the one issue "that left the least possibility of compromise, the one that would most pit morality against pragmatism". In the end, many would take comfort in the fact that the word "slavery" never occurs in the Constitution. The three-fifths clause was a compromise between those (in the North) who wanted no slaves counted, and those (in the South) who wanted all the slaves counted. The Constitution (Article IV, section 4) also allowed the federal government to suppress domestic violence, a provision that could be used against slave revolts. Congress could not ban the importation of slaves for 20 years. The need for the approval of three-fourths of the states for amendments made the constitutional abolition of slavery virtually impossible.

The importation of slaves into the United States was restricted in 1794, and finally banned in 1808, the earliest date the Constitution permitted (Article 1, section 9). Many Americans believed that the passage of these laws had finally resolved the issue of slavery in the United States. Any national discussion that might have continued over slavery was drowned out by other issues such as trade embargoes, maritime competition with Great Britain and France, the Barbary Wars, and the War of 1812. A notable exception to this quiet regarding slavery was the New Englanders' association of their frustration with the war with their resentment of the three-fifths clause that seemed to allow the South to dominate national politics.

During the aftermath of the American Revolution (1775–1783), the Northern states (north of the Mason–Dixon line separating Maryland from Pennsylvania and Delaware) abolished slavery by 1804, although in some states older slaves were turned into indentured servants who could not be bought or sold. In the Northwest Ordinance of 1787, Congress (at that time under the Articles of Confederation) barred slavery from the Midwestern territory north of the Ohio River. When Congress organized the territories acquired through the Louisiana Purchase of 1803, there was no ban on slavery.

=== Missouri Compromise ===
With the admission of Alabama as a slave state in 1819, the U.S. was equally divided, with 11 slave states and 11 free states. Later that year, Congressman James Tallmadge Jr. of New York initiated an uproar in the South when he proposed two amendments to a bill admitting Missouri to the Union as a free state. The first would have barred slaves from being moved to Missouri, and the second would have freed at age 25 all Missouri slaves born after admission to the Union. The admission of the new state of Missouri as a slave state would give the slave states a majority in the Senate, while passage of the Tallmadge Amendment would have given the free states a majority.

The Tallmadge amendments passed the House of Representatives but failed in the Senate when five Northern senators voted with all the Southern senators. The question was now the admission of Missouri as a slave state, and many leaders shared Thomas Jefferson's fear of a crisis over slavery – a fear that Jefferson described as "a fire bell in the night". The crisis was solved by the Missouri Compromise, in which Massachusetts agreed to cede control over its relatively large, sparsely populated and disputed exclave, the District of Maine. The compromise allowed Maine to be admitted to the Union as a free state at the same time that Missouri was admitted as a slave state. The Compromise also banned slavery in the Louisiana Purchase territory north and west of the state of Missouri along parallel 36°30′ north. The Missouri Compromise quieted the issue until its limitations on slavery were repealed by the Kansas–Nebraska Act of 1854.

In the South, the Missouri crisis reawakened old fears that a strong federal government could be a fatal threat to slavery. The Jeffersonian coalition that united southern planters and northern farmers, mechanics and artisans in opposition to the threat presented by the Federalist Party had started to dissolve after the War of 1812. It was not until the Missouri crisis that Americans became aware of the political possibilities of a sectional attack on slavery, and it was not until the mass politics of Andrew Jackson's administration that this type of organization around this issue became practical.

=== Nullification crisis ===
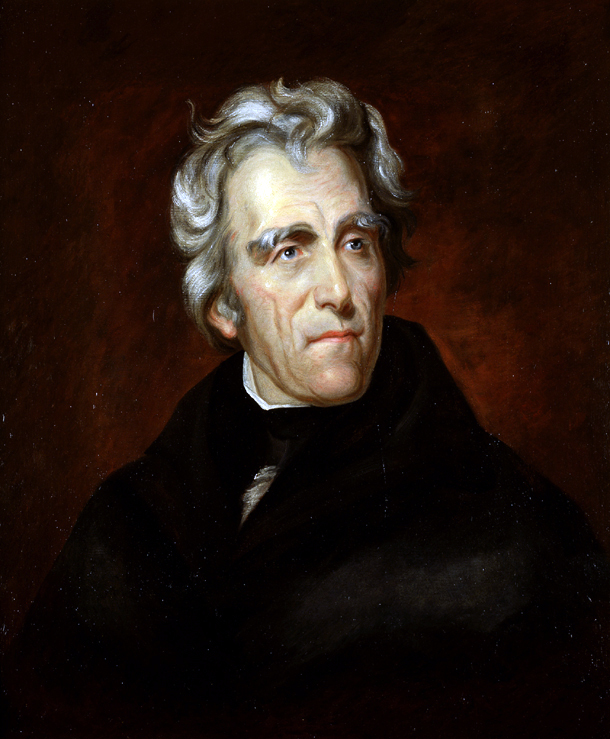
President Andrew Jackson viewed South Carolina's attempts to nullify the tariffs of 1828 and 1832 as tantamount to treason.

The nation suffered an economic downturn throughout the 1820s, and South Carolina was particularly affected. The highly protective Tariff of 1828 (called the "Tariff of Abominations" by its detractors), designed to protect American industry by taxing imported manufactured goods, was enacted into law during the last year of the presidency of John Quincy Adams. Opposed in the South and parts of New England, the expectation of the tariff's opponents was that with the election of Andrew Jackson the tariff would be significantly reduced.

By 1828 South Carolina state politics increasingly organized around the tariff issue. When the Jackson administration failed to take any actions to address their concerns, the most radical faction in the state began to advocate that the state declare the tariff null and void within South Carolina. In Washington, an open split on the issue occurred between Jackson and his vice president John C. Calhoun, the most effective proponent of the constitutional theory of state nullification through his 1828 "South Carolina Exposition and Protest".

Congress enacted a new tariff in 1832, but it offered the state little relief, resulting in the most dangerous sectional crisis since the Union was formed. Some militant South Carolinians even hinted at withdrawing from the Union in response. The newly elected South Carolina legislature then quickly called for the election of delegates to a state convention. Once assembled, the convention voted to declare null and void the tariffs of 1828 and 1832 within the state. President Andrew Jackson responded firmly, declaring nullification an act of treason. He then took steps to strengthen federal forts in the state.

Violence seemed a real possibility early in 1833 as Jacksonians in Congress introduced a "Force Bill" authorizing the president to use the federal Army and Navy in order to enforce acts of Congress. No other state had come forward to support South Carolina, and the state itself was divided on its willingness to continue the showdown with the federal government. The crisis ended when Clay and Calhoun worked to devise a compromise tariff. Both sides later claimed victory. Calhoun and his supporters in South Carolina claimed a victory for nullification, insisting that it had forced the revision of the tariff. Jackson's followers, however, saw the episode as a demonstration that no single state could assert its rights by independent action.

Calhoun, in turn, devoted his efforts to building up a sense of Southern solidarity so that when another standoff should come, the whole section might be prepared to act as a bloc in resisting the federal government. As early as 1830, in the midst of the crisis, Calhoun identified the right to own slaves – the foundation of the plantation agricultural system – as the chief southern minority right being threatened. In 1833, Jackson wrote "the tariff was only the pretext, and disunion and Southern confederacy the real object. The next pretext will be the negro, or slavery question."

The issue appeared again after 1842's Black Tariff. A period of relative free trade followed 1846's Walker Tariff, which had been largely written by Southerners. Northern industrialists (and some in western Virginia) complained it was too low to encourage the growth of industry.

=== Gag rule debates ===
From 1831 to 1836 William Lloyd Garrison and the American Anti-Slavery Society initiated a campaign to petition Congress to end slavery in the District of Columbia and all federal territories. Hundreds of thousands of petitions were sent, with the number reaching a peak in 1835.

The House passed the Pinckney Resolutions on May 26, 1836. The first of these stated that Congress had no constitutional authority to interfere with slavery in the states and the second that it "ought not" do so in the District of Columbia. The third resolution, known from the beginning as the "gag rule", provided that:

All petitions, memorials, resolutions, propositions, or papers, relating in any way, or to any extent whatsoever, to the subject of slavery or the abolition of slavery, shall, without being either printed or referred, be laid on the table and that no further action whatever shall be had thereon.

The first two resolutions passed by votes of 182 to 9 and 132 to 45. The gag rule, supported by Northern and Southern Democrats as well as some Southern Whigs, was passed with a vote of 117 to 68.

Former president John Quincy Adams, who was elected to the House of Representatives in 1830, became an early and central figure in the opposition to the gag rules. He argued that they were a direct violation of the First Amendment right "to petition the Government for a redress of grievances". A majority of Northern Whigs joined the opposition. Rather than suppress anti-slavery petitions, however, the gag rules only served to offend Americans from Northern states, and dramatically increase the number of petitions.

Since the original gag was a resolution, not a standing House Rule, it had to be renewed every session, and the Adams' faction often gained the floor before the gag could be imposed. However, in January 1840, the House of Representatives passed the Twenty-first Rule, which prohibited even the reception of anti-slavery petitions and was a standing House rule. Now the pro-petition forces focused on trying to revoke a standing rule. The Rule raised serious doubts about its constitutionality and had less support than the original Pinckney gag, passing only by 114 to 108. Throughout the gag period, Adams' "superior talent in using and abusing parliamentary rules" and skill in baiting his enemies into making mistakes, enabled him to evade the rule and debate the slavery issues. The gag rule was finally rescinded on December 3, 1844, by a strongly sectional vote of 108 to 80, all the Northern and four Southern Whigs voting for repeal, along with 55 of the 71 Northern Democrats.

=== Antebellum South and the Union ===
There had been a continuing contest between the states and the national government over the power of the latter – and over the loyalty of the citizenry – almost since the founding of the republic. The Kentucky and Virginia Resolutions of 1798, for example, had defied the Alien and Sedition Acts, and at the Hartford Convention, New England voiced its opposition to President James Madison and the War of 1812, and discussed secession from the Union.

==== Southern culture ====
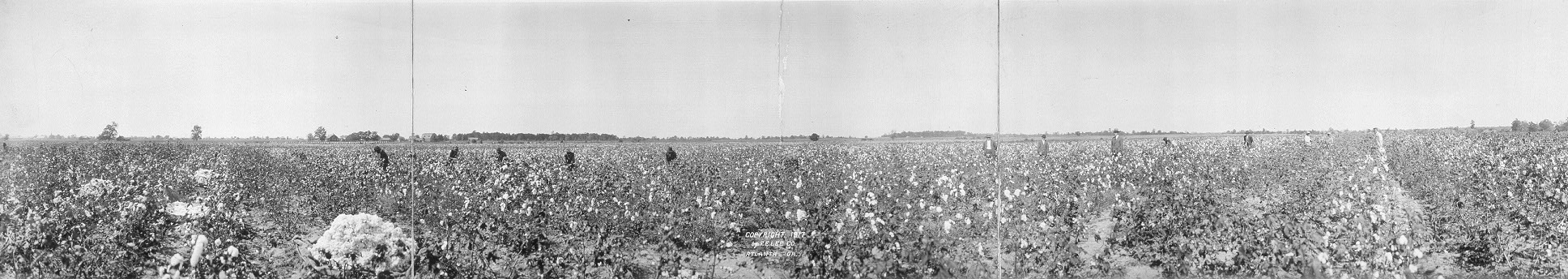
Picking cotton in Georgia

Although a minority of free Southerners owned slaves, free Southerners of all classes nevertheless defended the institution of slavery – threatened by the rise of free labor abolitionist movements in the Northern states – as the cornerstone of their social order.

Per the 1860 census, the percentage of slaveholding families was as follows:

- 26% in the 15 Slave states (AL, AR, DE, FL, GA, KY, LA, MD, MS, MO, NC, SC, TN, TX, VA)
- 16% in the 4 Border states (DE, KY, MD, MO)
- 31% in the 11 Confederate states (AL, AR, FL, GA, LA, MS, NC, SC, TN, TX, VA)
- 37% in the first 7 Confederate states (AL, FL, GA, LA, MS, SC, TX)
- 25% in the second 4 Confederate states (AR, NC, TN, VA)

Mississippi was the highest at 49%, followed by South Carolina at 46%.

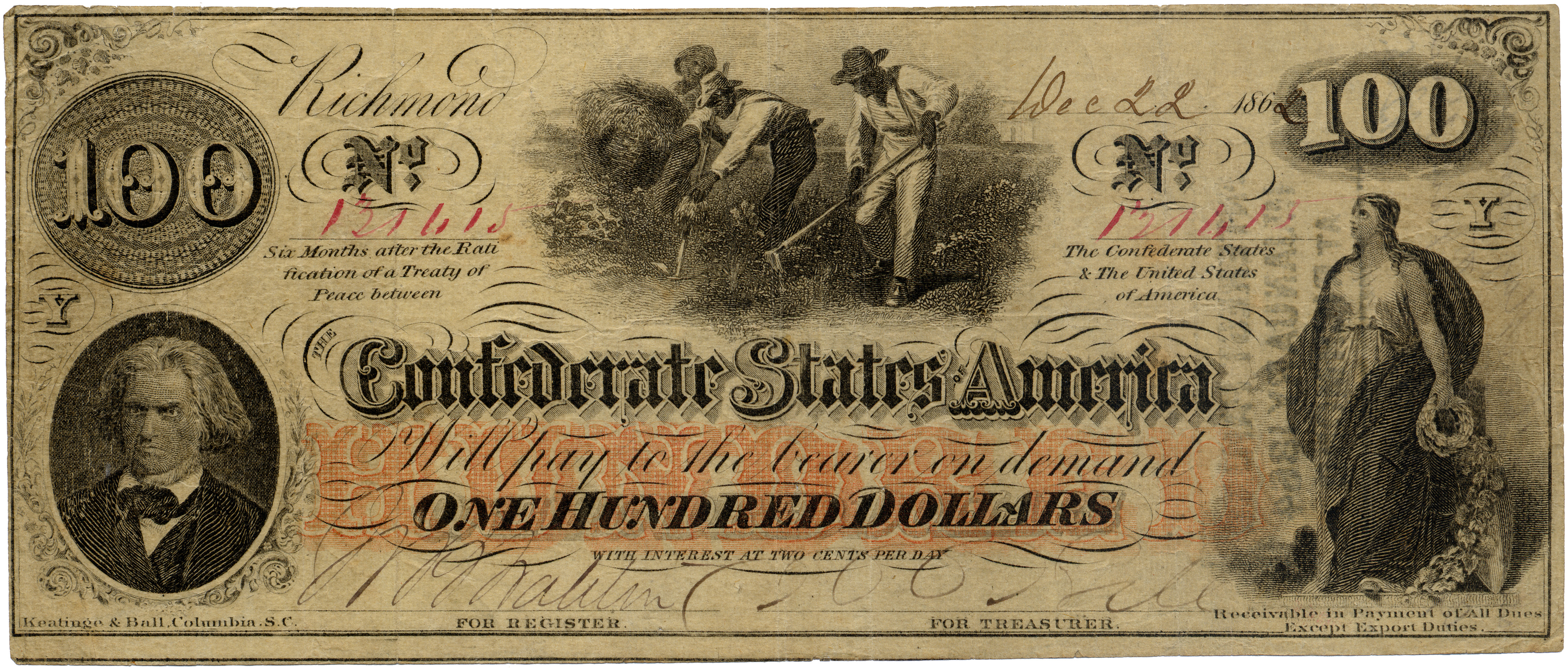
Slaves working in the fields, on the Confederate $100 bill, 1862–63. On the left is John C. Calhoun, on the right Columbia.

Based on a system of plantation slavery, the social structure of the South was far more stratified and patriarchal than that of the North. In 1850 there were around 350,000 slaveholders in a total free Southern population of about six million. Among slaveholders, the concentration of slave ownership was unevenly distributed. Perhaps around 7 percent of slaveholders owned roughly three-quarters of the slave population. The largest slaveholders, generally owners of large plantations, represented the top stratum of Southern society. They benefited from economies of scale and needed large numbers of slaves on big plantations to produce cotton, a highly profitable labor-intensive crop.

Per the 1860 Census, in the 15 slave states, slaveholders owning 30 or more slaves (7% of all slaveholders) owned approximately 1,540,000 slaves (39% of all slaves).

In the 1850s, as large plantation owners outcompeted smaller farmers, more slaves were owned by fewer planters. Yet poor whites and small farmers generally accepted the political leadership of the planter elite. Several factors helped explain why slavery was not under serious threat of internal collapse from any move for democratic change initiated from the South. First, given the opening of new territories in the West for white settlement, many non-slaveowners also perceived a possibility that they, too, might own slaves at some point in their life.

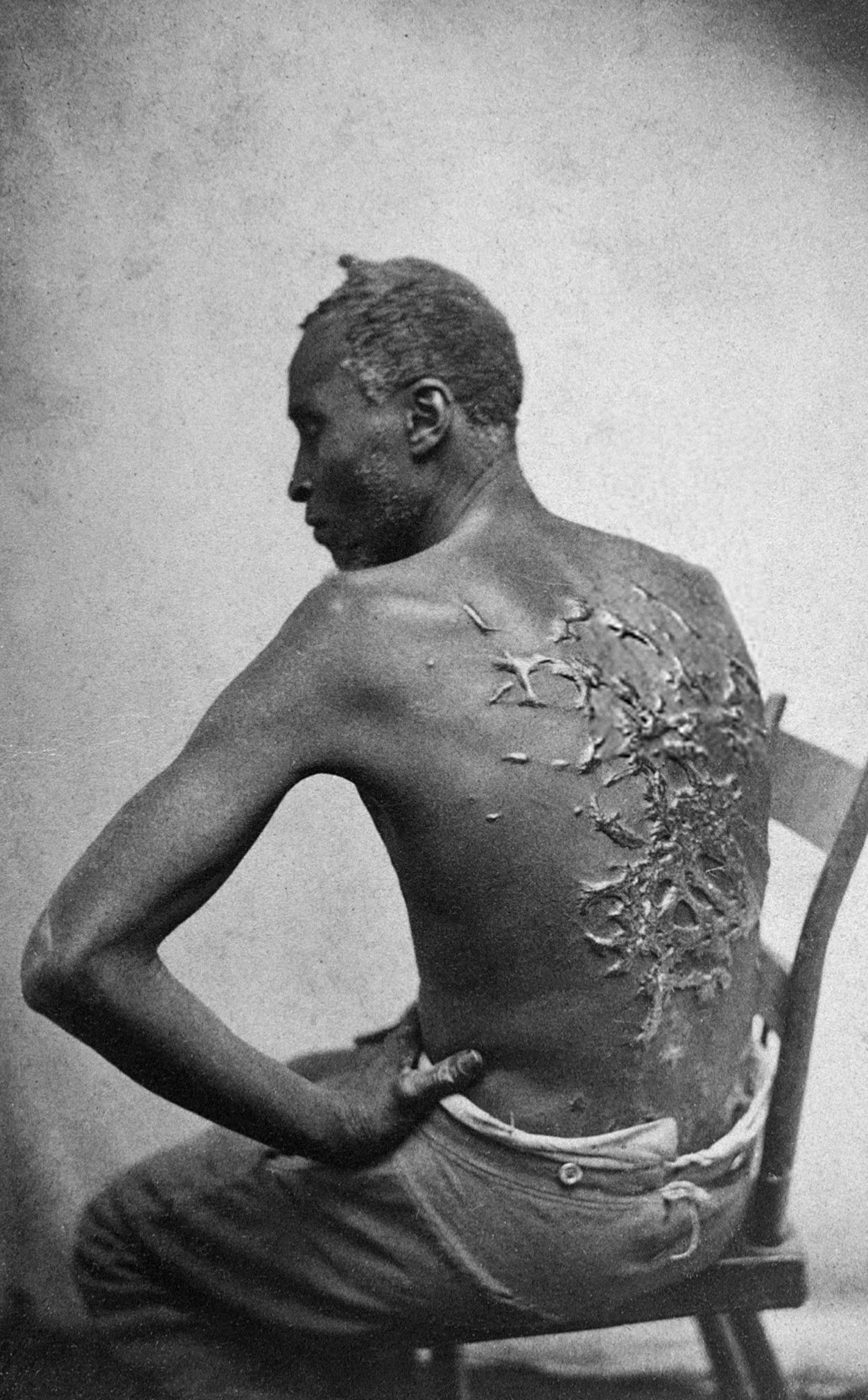
Violent repression of slaves was a common theme in abolitionist literature in the North. Above, this famous 1863 photo of a slave, Gordon, deeply scarred from whipping by an overseer, was distributed by abolitionists to illustrate what they saw as the barbarism of Southern society.

Second, small free farmers in the South often embraced racism, making them unlikely agents for internal democratic reforms in the South. The principle of white supremacy, accepted by almost all white Southerners of all classes, made slavery seem legitimate, natural, and essential for a civilized society. Racial discrimination was completely legal. White racism in the South was sustained by official systems of repression such as the slave codes and elaborate codes of speech, behavior, and social practices illustrating the subordination of blacks to whites. For example, the "slave patrols" were among the institutions bringing together southern whites of all classes in support of the prevailing economic and racial order. Serving as slave "patrollers" and "overseers" offered white Southerners positions of power and honor in their communities. Policing and punishing blacks who transgressed the regimentation of slave society was a valued community service in the South, where the fear of free blacks threatening law and order figured heavily in the public discourse of the period.

Third, many yeomen and small farmers with a few slaves were linked to elite planters through the market economy. In many areas, small farmers depended on local planter elites for vital goods and services, including access to cotton gins, markets, feed and livestock, and even loans (since the banking system was not well developed in the antebellum South). Southern tradesmen often depended on the richest planters for steady work. Such dependency effectively deterred many white non-slaveholders from engaging in any political activity that was not in the interest of the large slaveholders. Furthermore, whites of varying social class, including poor whites and "plain folk" who worked outside or in the periphery of the market economy (and therefore lacked any real economic interest in the defense of slavery) might nonetheless be linked to elite planters through extensive kinship networks. Since inheritance in the South was often unequitable (and generally favored eldest sons), it was not uncommon for a poor white person to be perhaps the first cousin of the richest plantation owner of his county and to share the same militant support of slavery as his richer relatives. Finally, there was no secret ballot at the time anywhere in the United States – this innovation did not become widespread in the U.S. until the 1880s. For a typical white Southerner, this meant that casting a ballot against the wishes of the establishment meant running the risk of being socially ostracized.

Thus, by the 1850s, Southern slaveholders and non-slaveholders alike felt increasingly encircled psychologically and politically in the national political arena because of the rise of free soilism and abolitionism in the Northern states. Increasingly dependent on the North for manufactured goods, for commercial services, and for loans, and increasingly cut off from the flourishing agricultural regions of the Northwest, they faced the prospects of a growing abolitionist movement in the North.

Historian William C. Davis disputes that Southern culture was different from that of Northern states or that it was a cause of the war, stating, "Socially and culturally the North and South were not much different. They prayed to the same deity, spoke the same language, shared the same ancestry, sang the same songs. National triumphs and catastrophes were shared by both." Davis argues that slavery, not culture, was the cause of the war: "For all the myths they would create to the contrary, the only significant and defining difference between them was slavery, where it existed and where it did not, for by 1804 it had virtually ceased to exist north of Maryland. Slavery demarked not just their labor and economic situations, but power itself in the new republic."

==== Militant defense of slavery ====
With the outcry over developments in Kansas strong in the North, defenders of slavery – increasingly committed to a way of life that abolitionists and their sympathizers considered obsolete or immoral – articulated a militant pro-slavery ideology that would lay the groundwork for secession upon the election of a Republican president. Southerners waged a vitriolic response to political change in the North. Slaveholding interests sought to uphold their constitutional rights in the territories and to maintain sufficient political strength to repulse "hostile" and "ruinous" legislation. Behind this shift was the growth of the cotton textile industry in the North and in Europe, which left slavery more important than ever to the Southern economy.

==== Southern fears of modernization ====
According to historian James M. McPherson, exceptionalism applied not to the South but to the North after the North ended slavery and launched an industrial revolution that led to urbanization, which in turn led to increased education, which led to various reform movements, especially abolitionism, gaining strength. The fact that seven immigrants out of eight settled in the North (and the fact that most immigrants viewed slavery with disfavor), compounded by the fact that twice as many whites left the South for the North as vice versa, contributed to the South's defensive-aggressive political behavior. The Charleston Mercury wrote that on the issue of slavery the North and South "are not only two Peoples, but they are rival, hostile Peoples." As De Bow's Review said, "We are resisting revolution.... We are not engaged in a Quixotic fight for the rights of man.... We are conservative."

Allan Nevins argued that the Civil War was an "irrepressible" conflict, adopting a phrase from Senator William H. Seward. Nevins synthesized contending accounts emphasizing moral, cultural, social, ideological, political, and economic issues. In doing so, he brought the historical discussion back to an emphasis on social and cultural factors. Nevins pointed out that the North and the South were rapidly becoming two different peoples, a point made also by historian Avery Craven. At the root of these cultural differences was the problem of slavery, but fundamental assumptions, tastes, and cultural aims of the regions were diverging in other ways as well. More specifically, the North was rapidly modernizing in a manner some perceived as threatening to the South. Historian McPherson explains:

When secessionists protested in 1861 that they were acting to preserve traditional rights and values, they were correct. They fought to preserve their constitutional liberties against the perceived Northern threat to overthrow them. The South's concept of republicanism had not changed in three-quarters of a century; the North's had. ... The ascension to power of the Republican Party, with its ideology of competitive, egalitarian free-labor capitalism, was a signal to the South that the Northern majority had turned irrevocably towards this frightening, revolutionary future.

Harry L. Watson has synthesized research on antebellum southern social, economic, and political history. Self-sufficient yeomen, in Watson's view, "collaborated in their own transformation" by allowing promoters of a market economy to gain political influence. Resultant "doubts and frustrations" provided fertile soil for the argument that southern rights and liberties were menaced by Black Republicanism.

J. Mills Thornton III explained the viewpoint of the average white Alabamian. Thornton contends that Alabama was engulfed in a severe crisis long before 1860. Deeply held principles of freedom, equality, and autonomy, as expressed in Republican values, appeared threatened, especially during the 1850s, by the relentless expansion of market relations and commercial agriculture. Alabamians were thus, he judged, prepared to believe the worst once Lincoln was elected.

=== Sectional tensions and the emergence of mass politics ===
The cry of Free Man was raised, not for the extension of liberty to the black man, but for the protection of the liberty of the white.

— Frederick Douglass

The politicians of the 1850s were acting in a society in which the traditional restraints that suppressed sectional conflict in the 1820s and 1850s – the most important of which being the stability of the two-party system – were being eroded as this rapid extension of democracy went forward in the North and South. It was an era when the mass political party galvanized voter participation to 80% or 90% turnout rates, and a time in which politics formed an essential component of American mass culture. Historians agree that political involvement was a larger concern to the average American in the 1850s than today. Politics was, in one of its functions, a form of mass entertainment, a spectacle with rallies, parades, and colorful personalities. Leading politicians, moreover, often served as a focus for popular interests, aspirations, and values.

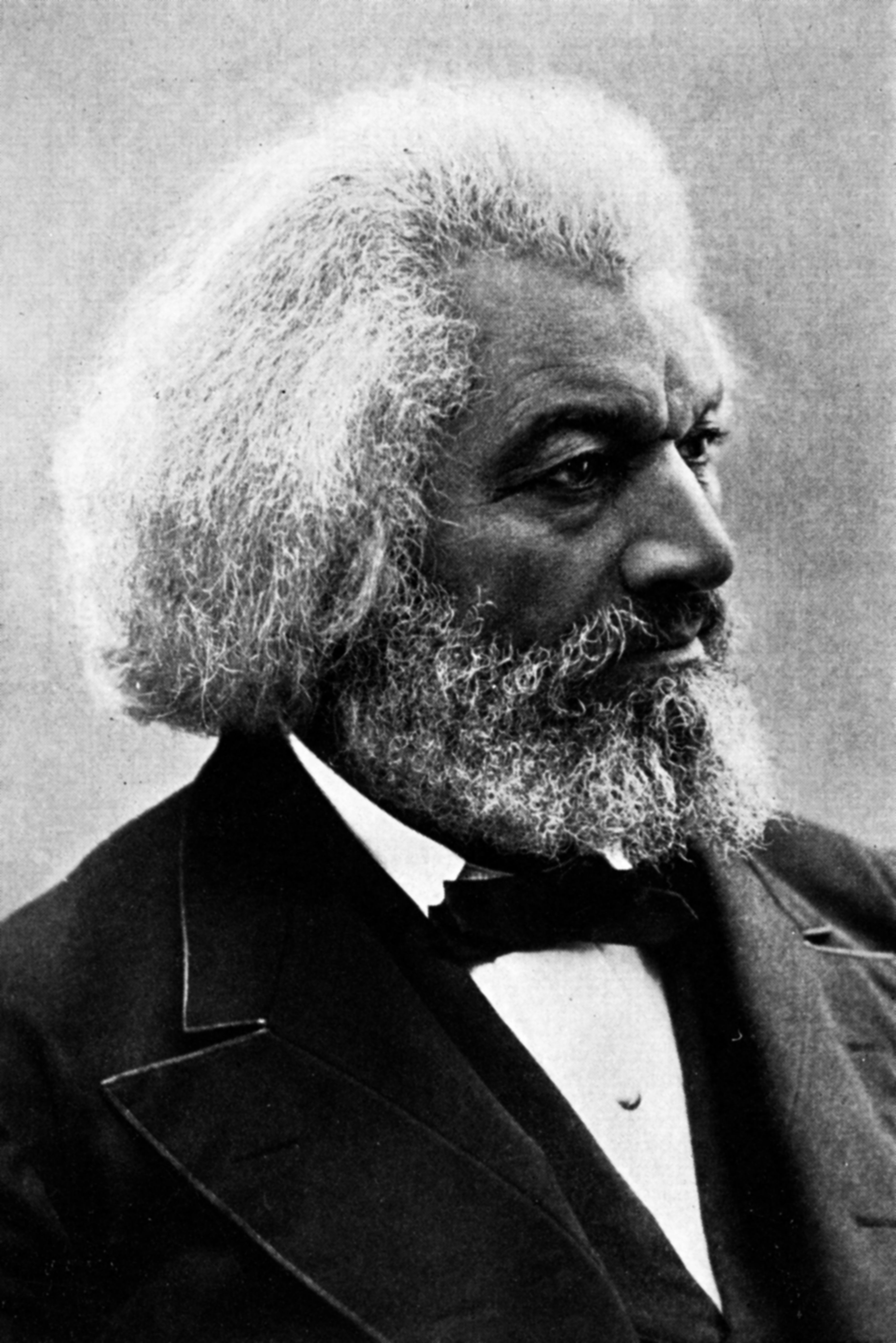
Abolitionist Frederick Douglass

Historian Allan Nevins, for instance, writes of political rallies in 1856 with turnouts of anywhere from twenty to fifty thousand men and women. Voter turnouts even ran as high as 84% by 1860. An abundance of new parties emerged 1854–56, including the Republicans, People's party men, Anti-Nebraskans, Fusionists, Know Nothings, Know-Somethings (anti-slavery nativists), Maine Lawites, Temperance men, Rum Democrats, Silver Gray Whigs, Hindus, Hard Shell Democrats, Soft Shells, Half Shells and Adopted Citizens. By 1858, they were mostly gone, and politics divided four ways. Republicans controlled most Northern states with a strong Democratic minority. The Democrats were split North and South and fielded two tickets in 1860. Southern non-Democrats tried different coalitions; most supported the Constitutional Union party in 1860.

Many Southern states held constitutional conventions in 1851 to consider the questions of nullification and secession. With the exception of South Carolina, whose convention election did not even offer the option of "no secession" but rather "no secession without the collaboration of other states", the Southern conventions were dominated by Unionists who voted down articles of secession.

== Economics ==
Modern historians generally agree that economic conflicts were not a major cause of the war. Though an economic basis to the sectional crisis was popular among the "Progressive school" of historians from the 1910s to the 1940s, few professional historians now subscribe to this explanation. According to economic historian Lee A. Craig, "In fact, numerous studies by economic historians over the past several decades reveal that economic conflict was not an inherent condition of North-South relations during the antebellum era and did not cause the Civil War."

When numerous groups tried at the last minute in 1860–61 to find a compromise to avert war, they did not turn to economic policies. The three major attempts at compromise, the Crittenden Compromise, the Corwin Amendment and the Washington Peace Conference, addressed only the slavery-related issues of fugitive slave laws, personal liberty laws, slavery in the territories and interference with slavery within the existing slave states.

=== Economic value of slavery to the South ===
Historian James L. Huston emphasizes the role of slavery as an economic institution. In October 1860 William Lowndes Yancey, a leading advocate of secession, placed the value of Southern-held slaves at $2.8 billion (~$81.7 billion in 2025). Huston writes:

Understanding the relations between wealth, slavery, and property rights in the South provides a powerful means of understanding southern political behavior leading to disunion. First, the size dimensions of slavery are important to comprehend, for slavery was a colossal institution. Second, the property rights argument was the ultimate defense of slavery, and white southerners and the proslavery radicals knew it. Third, the weak point in the protection of slavery by property rights was the federal government. ... Fourth, the intense need to preserve the sanctity of property rights in Africans led southern political leaders to demand the nationalization of slavery – the condition under which slaveholders would always be protected in their property holdings.

The cotton gin greatly increased the efficiency with which cotton could be harvested, contributing to the consolidation of "King Cotton" as the backbone of the economy of the Deep South, and to the entrenchment of the system of slave labor on which the cotton plantation economy depended. Any chance that the South would industrialize was over.

The tendency of monoculture cotton plantings to lead to soil exhaustion created a need for cotton planters to move their operations to new lands, and therefore to the westward expansion of slavery from the Eastern seaboard into new areas (e.g., Alabama, Mississippi, and beyond to East Texas).

=== Regional economic differences ===
An animation showing the free/slave status of U.S. states and territories, 1789–1861

The South, Midwest, and Northeast had quite different economic structures. They traded with each other and each became more prosperous by staying in the Union, a point many businessmen made in 1860–61. However, Charles A. Beard in the 1920s made a highly influential argument to the effect that these differences caused the war (rather than slavery or constitutional debates). He saw the industrial Northeast forming a coalition with the agrarian Midwest against the plantation South. Critics challenged his image of a unified Northeast and said that the region was in fact highly diverse with many different competing economic interests. In 1860–61, most business interests in the Northeast opposed war.

After 1950, only a few mainstream historians accepted the Beard interpretation, though it was accepted by libertarian economists. Historian Kenneth Stampp, who abandoned Beardianism after 1950, sums up the scholarly consensus: "Most historians ... now see no compelling reason why the divergent economies of the North and South should have led to disunion and civil war; rather, they find stronger practical reasons why the sections, whose economies neatly complemented one another, should have found it advantageous to remain united."

=== The political economy of the Antebellum Period ===
Peter Turchin theorized that a major driver of the American Civil War was economic. Using his metrics for civil conflict, he identified elite overproduction and popular immiseration as forces that fueled the sectionalism that led to war. Between 1820 and 1860, average wages relative to higher incomes fell by more than 40 percent, while the expansion of the planter class threatened yeoman farmers. The rise of the Free Soil Party, Know-Nothing movement, and later the Republican Party reflected a distressed political environment. Recurrent financial crises, such as the Panic of 1837, severe state debt crises in the 1840s, and Panic of 1857, added further accelerants. The destruction of the Southern planter elite allowed Northern industrialists and political machines to consolidate control over the economy during the Reconstruction Era and to establish a virtual monopoly on the American economy and political system through the Gilded Age.

=== Free labor vs. pro-slavery arguments ===
Historian Eric Foner argued that a free-labor ideology dominated thinking in the North, which emphasized economic opportunity. By contrast, Southerners described free labor as "greasy mechanics, filthy operators, small-fisted farmers, and moonstruck theorists". They strongly opposed the homestead laws that were proposed to give free farms in the west, fearing the small farmers would oppose plantation slavery. Indeed, opposition to homestead laws was far more common in secessionist rhetoric than opposition to tariffs. Southerners such as Calhoun argued that slavery was "a positive good", and that slaves were more civilized and morally and intellectually improved because of slavery. Karl Marx, developing his economic theories in the mid-19th century, expressed a class-based view of conditions in North America in 1861, believing "that the defeat of the 'slave-holding aristocracy' would enable the world's free workers to prosper as small landholders on America's endless frontier".

== Religious conflict ==
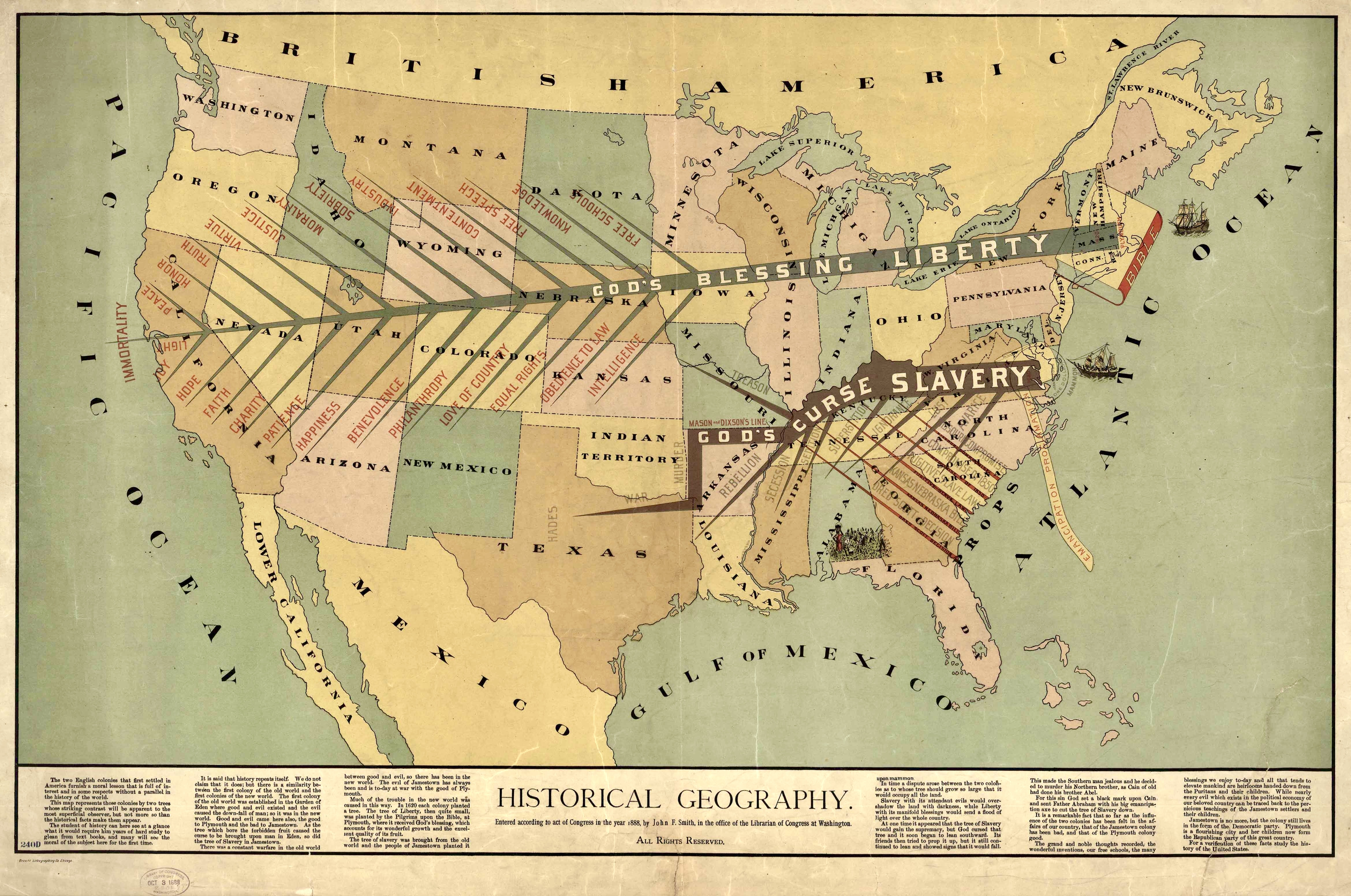
An 1888 map highlights the Religious view over the slavery question.

Led by Mark Noll, a body of scholarship has argued that the American debate over slavery became a shooting war in part because the two sides reached diametrically opposite conclusions based on reading the same authoritative source of guidance on moral questions: the King James Version of the Bible.

After the American Revolution and the disestablishment of government-sponsored churches, the U.S. experienced the Second Great Awakening, a massive Protestant revival. Without centralized church authorities, American Protestantism was heavily reliant on the Bible, which was read in the standard 19th-century Reformed hermeneutic of "common sense", literal interpretation as if the Bible were speaking directly about the modern American situation instead of events that occurred in a much different context, millennia ago. By the mid-19th century this form of religion and Bible interpretation had become a dominant strand in American religious, moral and political discourse, almost serving as a de facto state religion.

The Bible, interpreted under these assumptions, seemed to clearly suggest that slavery was Biblically justified:

The pro-slavery South could point to slaveholding by the godly patriarch Abraham (Gen 12:5; 14:14; 24:35–36; 26:13–14), a practice that was later incorporated into Israelite national law (Lev 25:44–46). It was never denounced by Jesus, who made slavery a model of discipleship (Mk 10:44). The Apostle Paul supported slavery, counseling obedience to earthly masters (Eph 6:5–9; Col 3:22–25) as a duty in agreement with "the sound words of our Lord Jesus Christ and the teaching which accords with godliness" (1 Tim 6:3). Because slaves were to remain in their present state unless they could win their freedom (1 Cor 7:20–24), he sent the fugitive slave Onesimus back to his owner Philemon (Phlm 10–20). The abolitionist north had a difficult time matching the pro-slavery south passage for passage. ... Professor Eugene Genovese, who has studied these biblical debates over slavery in minute detail, concludes that the pro-slavery faction clearly emerged victorious over the abolitionists except for one specious argument based on the so-called Curse of Ham (Gen 9:18–27). For our purposes, it is important to realize that the South won this crucial contest with the North by using the prevailing hermeneutic, or method of interpretation, on which both sides agreed. So decisive was its triumph that the South mounted a vigorous counterattack on the abolitionists as infidels who had abandoned the plain words of Scripture for the secular ideology of the Enlightenment.

Protestant churches in the U.S., unable to agree on what God's Word said about slavery, ended up with schisms between Northern and Southern branches: the Methodist Episcopal Church in 1844, the Baptists in 1845, and the Presbyterian Church in 1857. These splits presaged the subsequent split in the nation: "The churches played a major role in the dividing of the nation, and it is probably true that it was the splits in the churches which made a final split of the nation inevitable." The conflict over how to interpret the Bible was central:

The theological crisis occasioned by reasoning like [conservative Presbyterian theologian James H.] Thornwell's was acute. Many Northern Bible-readers and not a few in the South felt that slavery was evil. They somehow knew the Bible supported them in that feeling. Yet when it came to using the Bible as it had been used with such success to evangelize and civilize the United States, the sacred page was snatched out of their hands. Trust in the Bible and reliance upon a Reformed, literal hermeneutic had created a crisis that only bullets, not arguments, could resolve.

The result:

The question of the Bible and slavery in the era of the Civil War was never a simple question. The issue involved the American expression of a Reformed literal hermeneutic, the failure of hermeneutical alternatives to gain cultural authority, and the exercise of deeply entrenched intuitive racism, as well as the presence of Scripture as an authoritative religious book and slavery as an inherited social-economic relationship. The North – forced to fight on unfriendly terrain that it had helped to create – lost the exegetical war. The South certainly lost the shooting war. But constructive orthodox theology was the major loser when American believers allowed bullets instead of hermeneutical self-consciousness to determine what the Bible said about slavery. For the history of theology in America, the great tragedy of the Civil War is that the most persuasive theologians were the Rev. Drs. William Tecumseh Sherman and Ulysses S. Grant.

There were many causes of the Civil War, but the religious conflict, almost unimaginable in modern America, cut very deep at the time. Noll and others highlight the significance of the religion issue for the famous phrase in Lincoln's second inaugural: "Both read the same Bible and pray to the same God, and each invokes His aid against the other."

== Territorial expansion ==
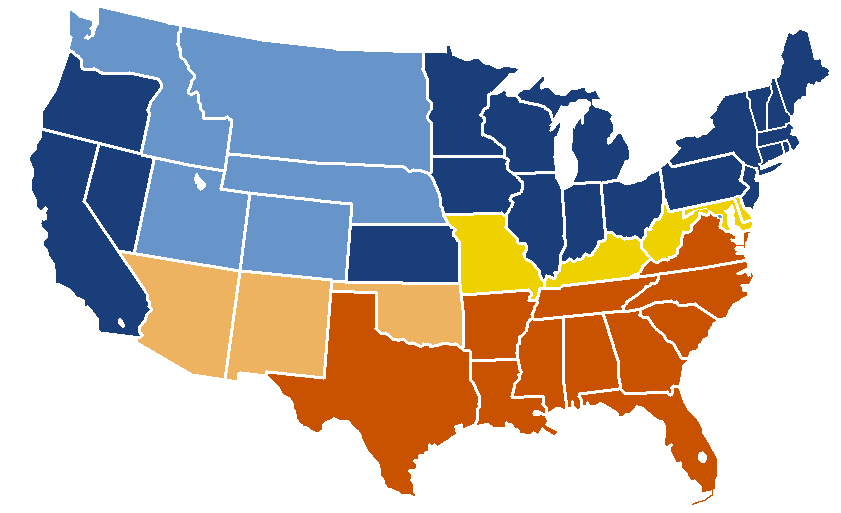
United States map, 1863: Union states Union territories not permitting slavery Border Union states, permitting slavery Confederate states Union territories permitting slavery (claimed by Confederacy)

Manifest destiny heightened the conflict over slavery. Each new territory acquired had to face the question of whether to allow or disallow the "peculiar institution". Between 1803 and 1854, the United States achieved a vast expansion of territory through purchase (Louisiana Purchase), negotiation (Adams–Onís Treaty, Oregon Treaty), and conquest (the Mexican Cession). Of the states carved out of these territories by 1845, all had entered the union as slave states: Louisiana, Missouri, Arkansas, Florida, and Texas, as well as the southern portions of Alabama and Mississippi. With the conquest of northern Mexico, including California, in 1848, slaveholding interests looked forward to the institution flourishing in these lands as well. Southerners also anticipated annexing as slave states Cuba (see Ostend Manifesto), Mexico, and Central America (see Golden Circle (proposed country)). Northern free soil interests vigorously sought to curtail any further expansion of slave soil. It was these territorial disputes that pro- and anti-slavery forces collided over.

By 1860, four doctrines had emerged to answer the question of federal control in the territories, and all claimed they were sanctioned by the Constitution. Two of the "conservative" doctrines emphasized the written text and historical precedents of the founding document, while the other two doctrines developed arguments that transcended the Constitution.

The first, represented by the Constitutional Union Party, argued that the Missouri Compromise apportionment of territory north for free soil and south for slavery should become a constitutional mandate. The failed Crittenden Compromise of 1860 was an expression of this view.

The second doctrine of Congressional preeminence, championed by Abraham Lincoln and the Republican Party, insisted that the Constitution did not bind legislators to a policy of balance – that slavery could be excluded altogether in a territory at the discretion of Congress – with one caveat: the due process clause of the Fifth Amendment must apply. In other words, Congress could restrict human bondage, but never establish it. The ill-fated Wilmot Proviso announced this position in 1846. The Proviso was a pivotal moment, as it was the first time slavery had become a major congressional issue based on sectionalism, instead of party lines. Its support by Northern Democrats and Whigs, and opposition by Southerners, was an omen of coming divisions.

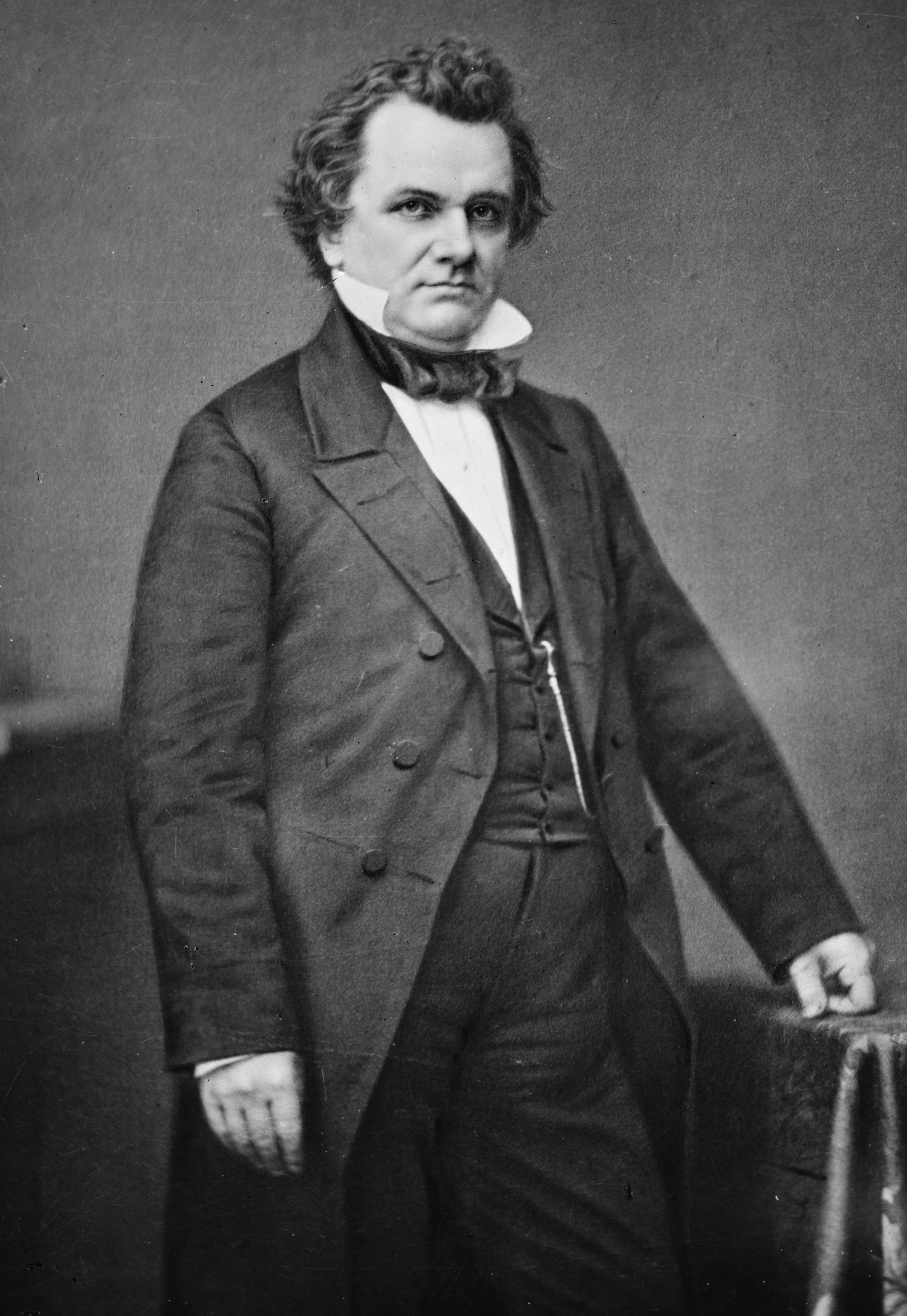
Sen. Stephen A. Douglas, author of the Kansas–Nebraska Act of 1854

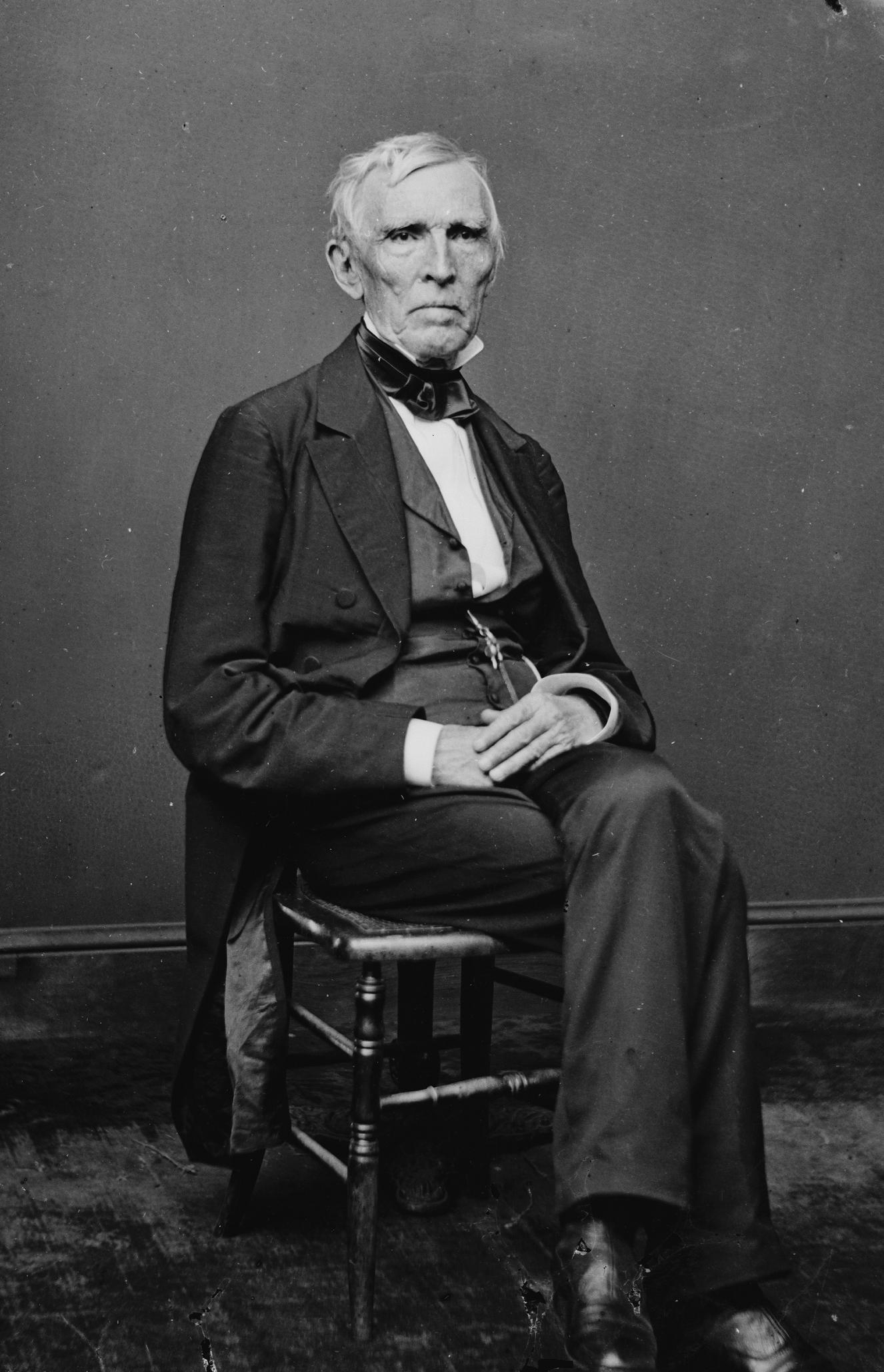
Sen. John J. Crittenden, of the 1860 Crittenden Compromise

Senator Stephen A. Douglas proclaimed the third doctrine: territorial or "popular" sovereignty, which asserted that settlers in a territory had the same rights as states to allow or disallow slavery as a local matter. The Kansas–Nebraska Act of 1854 legislated this doctrine. In the Kansas Territory, political conflict spawned "Bleeding Kansas", a paramilitary conflict between pro- and anti-slavery supporters. The House of Representatives voted to admit Kansas as a free state in early 1860, but its admission did not pass the Senate until January 1861, after the departure of Southern senators.

The fourth doctrine was advocated by Mississippi Senator, later Confederate President, Jefferson Davis. It was one of state sovereignty ("states' rights"), also known as the "Calhoun doctrine", named after the South Carolinian political theorist and statesman John C. Calhoun. Rejecting the arguments for federal authority or self-government, state sovereignty would empower states to promote expansion of slavery as part of the federal union under the Constitution. "States' rights" was an ideology formulated and applied as a means of advancing slave state interests through federal authority. As historian Thomas L Krannawitter points out, "[T]he Southern demand for federal slave protection represented a demand for an unprecedented expansion of federal power."

These four doctrines comprised the dominant ideologies presented to the public before the 1860 presidential election. As a practical matter, however, slavery was little practiced in the territories by 1860. The 1860 census showed that Utah Territory had 29 slaves; Nebraska had 15; Kansas had 2 (it was abolished there in early 1861 with statehood). There were no slaves in the other territories of Colorado, Washington, Nevada, New Mexico and Dakota, and none in the new states of California & Oregon.

=== Territories from the Mexican–American War ===
The Mexican–American War and its aftermath was a key territorial event in the leadup to the war. As the Treaty of Guadalupe Hidalgo finalized the conquest of northern Mexico in 1848, slaveholding interests looked forward to expanding into these lands. Prophetically, Ralph Waldo Emerson wrote that "Mexico will poison us", referring to the ensuing divisions around whether the conquered lands would end up slave or free. Northern free-soil interests vigorously sought to curtail expansion of slave territory. The Compromise of 1850 over California balanced a free-soil state with a stronger federal fugitive slave law for a political settlement, after strife in the 1840s. But the states admitted following California were all free: Minnesota (1858), Oregon (1859), and Kansas (1861). In the Southern states, the question of slavery's expansion westward again became explosive. The South and North drew the same conclusion: "The power to decide the question of slavery for the territories was the power to determine the future of slavery itself." After the Utah Territory legalized slavery in 1852, the Utah War of 1857 saw Mormon settlers fighting the government.

Proposals included:

- The Wilmot Proviso banning slavery in any new territory to be acquired from Mexico, not including Texas, which had been annexed the previous year. Passed by the United States House of Representatives in August 1846 and February 1847 but not the Senate. Later an effort to attach the proviso to the Treaty of Guadalupe Hidalgo also failed.
- Failed amendments to the Wilmot Proviso by William W. Wick and then Stephen Douglas extending the Missouri Compromise line (36°30′ parallel north) west to the Pacific Ocean, allowing slavery in most of present-day New Mexico and Arizona, southern Nevada, and Southern California, as well as any other territories that might be acquired from Mexico. The line was again proposed by the Nashville Convention of June 1850.
- Popular sovereignty, developed by Lewis Cass and Douglas as the eventual Democratic Party position, letting each territory decide whether to allow slavery.
- William L. Yancey's "Alabama Platform", endorsed by the Alabama and Georgia legislatures and by Democratic state conventions in Florida and Virginia, called for no restrictions on slavery in the territories either by the federal government or by territorial governments before statehood, opposition to any candidates supporting either the Wilmot Proviso or popular sovereignty, and federal legislation overruling Mexican anti-slavery laws.
- General Zachary Taylor, who became the Whig candidate in 1848 and then president from March 1849 to July 1850, proposed after becoming President that the entire area become two free states, called California and New Mexico, but much larger than the eventual ones. None of the area would be left as an unorganized or organized territory, avoiding the question of slavery in the territories.
- The Mormons' proposal for a State of Deseret, incorporating most of the area of the Mexican Cession but excluding the large non-Mormon populations in Northern California and central New Mexico, was considered unlikely to succeed in Congress, but nevertheless in 1849 President Zachary Taylor sent his agent John Wilson westward with a proposal to combine California and Deseret as a single state, decreasing the number of new free states and the erosion of Southern parity in the Senate.

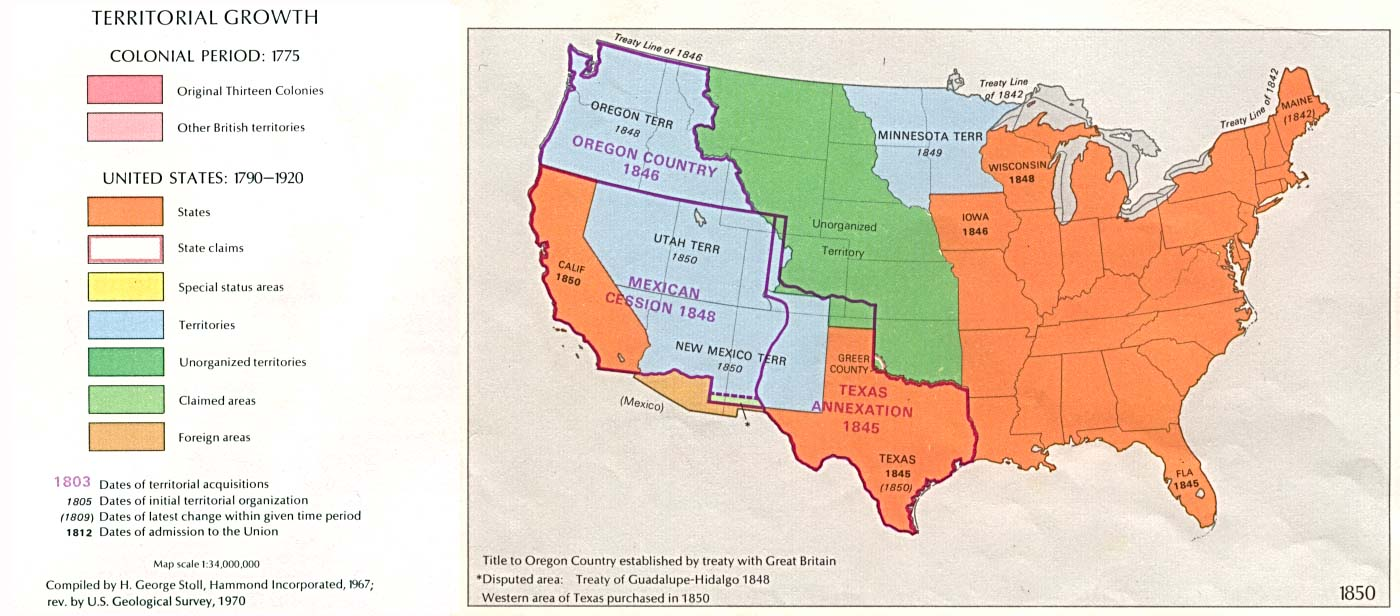
Territorial growth from 1840 to 1850

- The Compromise of 1850, proposed by Henry Clay in January 1850, guided to passage by Douglas over Northern Whig and Southern Democrat opposition, and enacted September 1850, admitted California as a free state, including Southern California, and organized Utah Territory and New Mexico Territory with slavery to be decided by popular sovereignty. Texas dropped its claim to the disputed northwestern areas in return for debt relief, and the areas were divided between the two new territories and unorganized territory. El Paso, where Texas had successfully established county government, was left in Texas. No territory dominated by Southerners (like the later short-lived Confederate Territory of Arizona) was created. Also, the slave trade was abolished in Washington, D.C. (but not slavery itself), and the Fugitive Slave Act was strengthened.

.==Abolitionism==

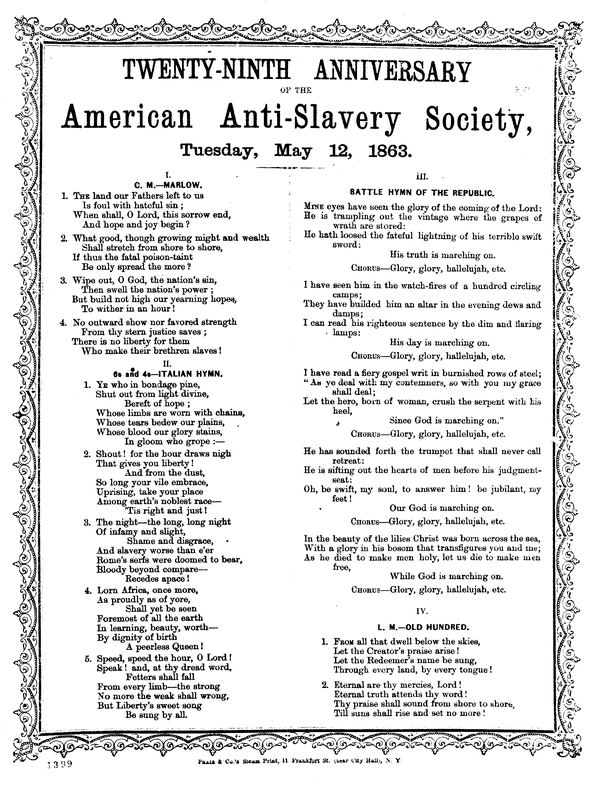
Platform of the American Anti-Slavery Society, founded in 1833 by William Lloyd Garrison and Arthur Tappan

The abolitionists—those advocating the end of slavery—were active in the decades leading up to the war. They traced their philosophical roots back to certain Puritans, who believed slavery was morally wrong. An early Puritan writing on slavery was The Selling of Joseph, by Samuel Sewall in 1700. In it, Sewall condemned slavery and the slave trade, and refuted justifications for slavery.

The American Revolution and the cause of liberty added impetus to the abolitionist cause. Even in Southern states, laws were changed to limit slavery and facilitate manumission. The amount of indentured servitude dropped dramatically throughout the country. An Act Prohibiting Importation of Slaves sailed through Congress with little opposition. President Thomas Jefferson supported it, and it went into effect on January 1, 1808, the first day the Constitution permitted Congress to prohibit importation of slaves. Benjamin Franklin and James Madison helped found manumission societies. Influenced by the Revolution, many slave owners freed their slaves, but some, such as George Washington, did so only in their wills. The number of free black people as a proportion of the black population in the upper South increased from less than 1 percent to nearly 10 percent between 1790-1810.

The establishment of the Northwest Territory as "free soil"—no slavery—by Manasseh Cutler and Rufus Putnam would prove crucial. This territory doubled the size of the US. If those states had been slave states and voted for Lincoln's chief opponent in 1860, Lincoln would not have become president.

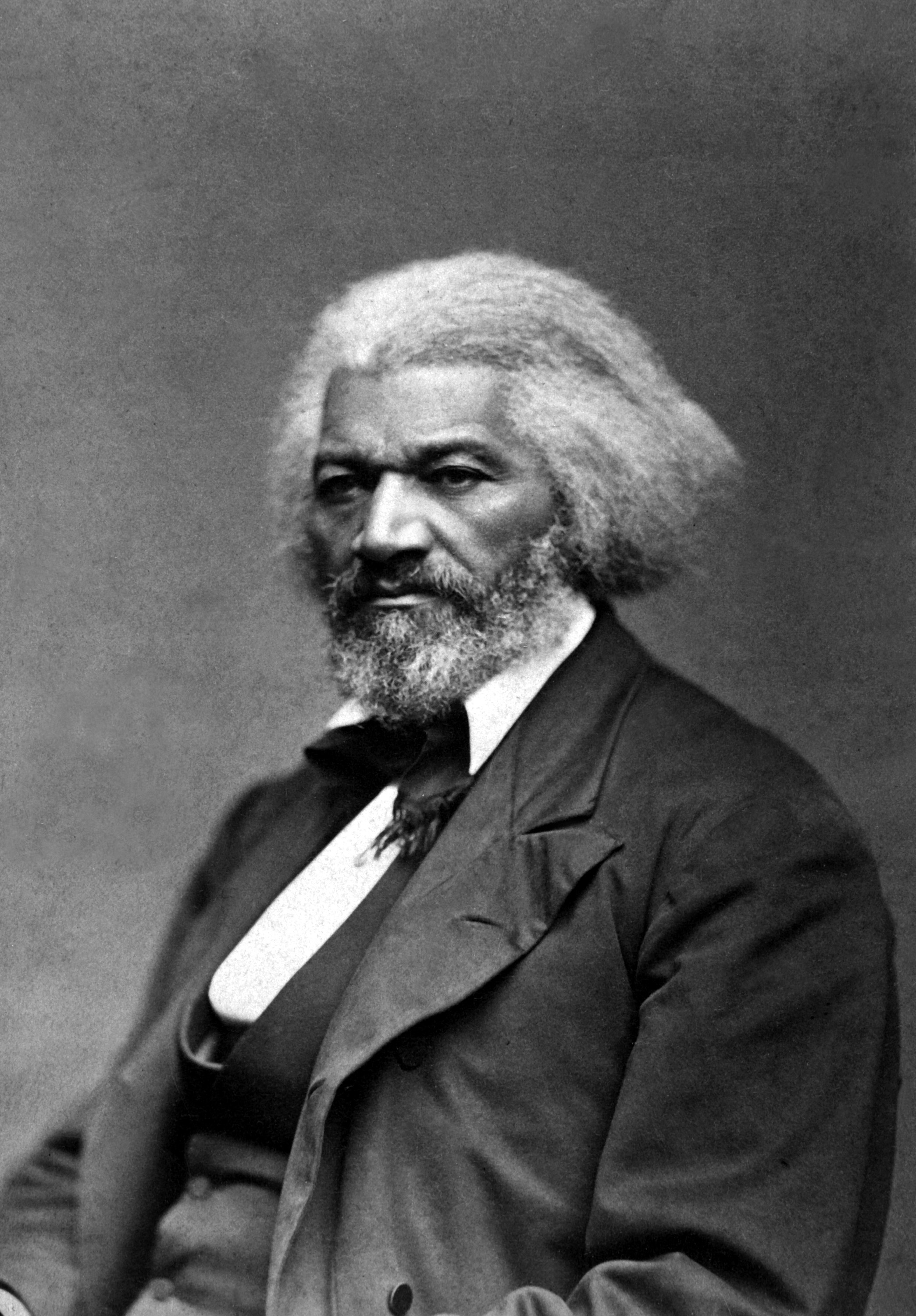
Frederick Douglass, a former slave, was a leading abolitionist

In the decades leading up to the war, abolitionists, such as Theodore Parker, Ralph Waldo Emerson, Henry David Thoreau, and Frederick Douglass, repeatedly used the Puritan heritage of the country to bolster their cause. The most radical anti-slavery newspaper, The Liberator, invoked Puritan values over a thousand times. Parker, in urging New England congressmen to support slavery's abolition, wrote, "The son of the Puritan ... is sent to Congress to stand up for Truth and Right." Literature spread the message; key works included Twelve Years a Slave, the Narrative of the Life of Frederick Douglass, American Slavery as It Is, and the most important: Uncle Tom's Cabin, the best-selling book of the 19th century, aside from the Bible.

An unusual abolitionist was Hinton Rowan Helper, whose 1857 book, The Impending Crisis of the South: How to Meet It, "[e]ven more perhaps than Uncle Tom's Cabin ... fed the fires of sectional controversy leading up to the...War." A Southerner and virulent racist, Helper was nevertheless an abolitionist because he believed, and showed with statistics, that slavery "impeded the progress and prosperity of the South, ... dwindled our commerce, and other similar pursuits, into the most contemptible insignificance; sunk a large majority of our people in galling poverty and ignorance, ... [and] entailed upon us a humiliating dependence on the Free States...."

By 1840 more than 15,000 people were members of abolitionist societies. Abolitionism became a popular expression of moralism and a factor that led to the war. In churches, conventions, newspapers, abolitionists advocated an immediate end to slavery. The issue split religious groups, with even the main denominations forming rival Southern and Northern churches as the war approached. In 1845 the Baptists split over slavery into the Northern Baptists and Southern Baptists.

Abolitionist sentiment was not exclusively religious or moral. The Whig Party became increasingly opposed to slavery because it saw it as inherently against the ideals of capitalism and the free market. Whig leader William H. Seward (later Lincoln's secretary of state) proclaimed there was an "irrepressible conflict" between slavery and free labor, and that slavery had left the South backward and undeveloped. As the Whig Party dissolved in the 1850s, the mantle of abolition fell to its newly formed successor, the Republican Party.

== States' rights ==
A long-running dispute over the war's origin is to what extent it was caused by the South's desire for stronger states' rights. The consensus among historians is that the war was not fought about states' rights. But the issue is frequently referenced in popular accounts and has much traction among Southerners. Southerners advocating secession argued that just as each state had decided to join the Union, a state had the right to secede—leave—at any time. Northerners (including pro-slavery president Buchanan) rejected that notion as opposed to the will of the Founding Fathers, who said they were setting up a Perpetual Union.

Historian James M. McPherson points out that even if Confederates genuinely fought over states' rights, it boiled down to states' right to slavery. McPherson writes concerning states' rights and other non-slavery explanations:

While one or more of these interpretations remain popular among the Sons of Confederate Veterans and other Southern heritage groups, few professional historians now subscribe to them. Of all these interpretations, the states'-rights argument is perhaps the weakest. It fails to ask the question, states' rights for what purpose? States' rights, or sovereignty, was always more a means than an end, an instrument to achieve a certain goal more than a principle.

States' rights was an ideology applied as a means of advancing slave state interests through federal authority. Thomas Krannawitter notes the "Southern demand for federal slave protection represented a demand for an unprecedented expansion of Federal power." Before the war, slavery advocates supported use of federal powers to enforce and extend slavery, as with the Fugitive Slave Act of 1850 and the Dred Scott v. Sandford decision. The faction that pushed for secession often infringed on states' rights. Because of the overrepresentation of pro-slavery factions in the federal government, many Northerners, even non-abolitionists, feared the Slave Power conspiracy. Some Northern states resisted the enforcement of the Fugitive Slave Act. Eric Foner states that the act "could hardly have been designed to arouse greater opposition in the North. It overrode state and local laws and legal procedures and 'commanded' individual citizens to assist, when called upon, in capturing runaways." He continues, "It certainly did not reveal, on the part of slaveholders, sensitivity to states' rights." According to Paul Finkelman, "the southern states mostly complained that the northern states were asserting their states' rights and that the national government was not powerful enough to counter these northern claims." The Confederate Constitution also "federally" required slavery to be legal in all Confederate states and claimed territories.

== Compromise of 1850 ==
The victory of the United States over Mexico resulted in the addition of large new territories conquered from Mexico. Controversy over whether the territories would be slave or free raised the risk of a war between slave and free states, and Northern support for the Wilmot Proviso, which would have banned slavery in the conquered territories, increased sectional tensions. The controversy was temporarily resolved by the Compromise of 1850, which allowed the territories of Utah and New Mexico to decide for or against slavery, but also allowed the admission of California as a free state, reduced the size of the slave state of Texas by adjusting the boundary, and ended the slave trade but not slavery itself in the District of Columbia. In return, the South got a stronger fugitive slave law than the version mentioned in the US Constitution. The Fugitive Slave Law would reignite controversy over slavery.

=== Fugitive Slave Law issues ===
The Fugitive Slave Act of 1850 required Northerners to assist Southerners in reclaiming fugitive slaves, which many Northerners strongly opposed. Anthony Burns was among the fugitive slaves captured and returned in chains to slavery as a result of the law. Harriet Beecher Stowe's best-selling novel Uncle Tom's Cabin greatly increased opposition to the Fugitive Slave Act.

== Kansas–Nebraska Act (1854) ==
Most people thought the Compromise had ended the territorial issue, but Stephen A. Douglas reopened it in 1854. Douglas proposed the Kansas–Nebraska Bill with the intention of opening up vast new high-quality farm lands to settlement. As a Chicagoan, he was especially interested in the railroad connections from Chicago into Kansas and Nebraska, but that was not a controversial point. More importantly, Douglas firmly believed in democracy at the grass roots – that actual settlers have the right to decide on slavery, not politicians from other states. His bill provided that popular sovereignty, through the territorial legislatures, should decide "all questions pertaining to slavery", thus effectively repealing the Missouri Compromise. The ensuing public reaction against it created a firestorm of protest in the Northern states. It was seen as an effort to repeal the Missouri Compromise. However, the popular reaction in the first month after the bill's introduction failed to foreshadow the gravity of the situation. As Northern papers initially ignored the story, Republican leaders lamented the lack of a popular response.

Eventually, the popular reaction did come, but the leaders had to spark it. Salmon P. Chase's "Appeal of the Independent Democrats" did much to arouse popular opinion. In New York, William H. Seward finally took it upon himself to organize a rally against the Nebraska bill, since none had arisen spontaneously. Press such as the National Era, the New-York Tribune, and local free-soil journals, condemned the bill. The Lincoln–Douglas debates of 1858 drew national attention to the issue of slavery expansion.

== Fragmentation of the American party system ==
=== Founding of the Republican Party (1854) ===
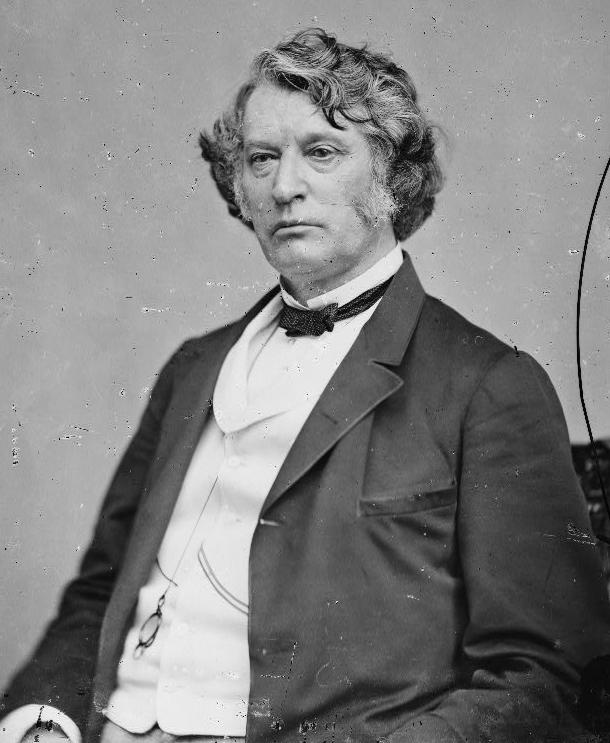
Charles Sumner, the Senate's leading opponent of slavery

The American party system had been dominated by Whigs and Democrats for decades leading up to the Civil War. But the Whig party's increasing internal divisions had made it a party of strange bedfellows by the 1850s. An ascendant anti-slavery wing clashed with a traditionalist and increasingly pro-slavery southern wing. These divisions came to a head in the 1852 election, where Whig candidate Winfield Scott was trounced by Franklin Pierce. Southern Whigs, who had supported the prior Whig president Zachary Taylor, had been burned by Taylor and were unwilling to support another Whig. Taylor, who despite being a slaveowner, had proved notably anti-slavery despite campaigning neutrally on the issue. With the loss of Southern Whig support, and the loss of votes in the North to the Free Soil Party, Whigs seemed doomed. So they were, as they would never again contest a presidential election.

The final nail in the Whig coffin was the Kansas–Nebraska act. It was also the spark that began the Republican Party, which would take in both Whigs and Free Soilers and create an anti-slavery party that the Whigs had always resisted becoming. The Act opened Kansas Territory and Nebraska Territory to slavery and future admission as slave states, thus implicitly repealing the prohibition on slavery in territory north of 36° 30′ latitude that had been part of the Missouri Compromise. This change was viewed by anti-slavery Northerners as an aggressive, expansionist maneuver by the slave-owning South. Opponents of the Act were intensely motivated and began forming a new party. The Party began as a coalition of anti-slavery Conscience Whigs such as Zachariah Chandler and Free Soilers such as Salmon P. Chase.

The first anti-Nebraska local meeting where "Republican" was suggested as a name for a new anti-slavery party was held in a Ripon, Wisconsin schoolhouse on March 20, 1854. The first statewide convention that formed a platform and nominated candidates under the Republican name was held near Jackson, Michigan, on July 6, 1854. At that convention, the party opposed the expansion of slavery into new territories and selected a statewide slate of candidates. The Midwest took the lead in forming state Republican Party tickets; apart from St. Louis and a few areas adjacent to free states, there were no efforts to organize the Party in the southern states. So was born the Republican Party – campaigning on the popular, emotional issue of "free soil" in the frontier – which would capture the White House just six years later.

=== "Bleeding Kansas" and the elections of 1856 ===
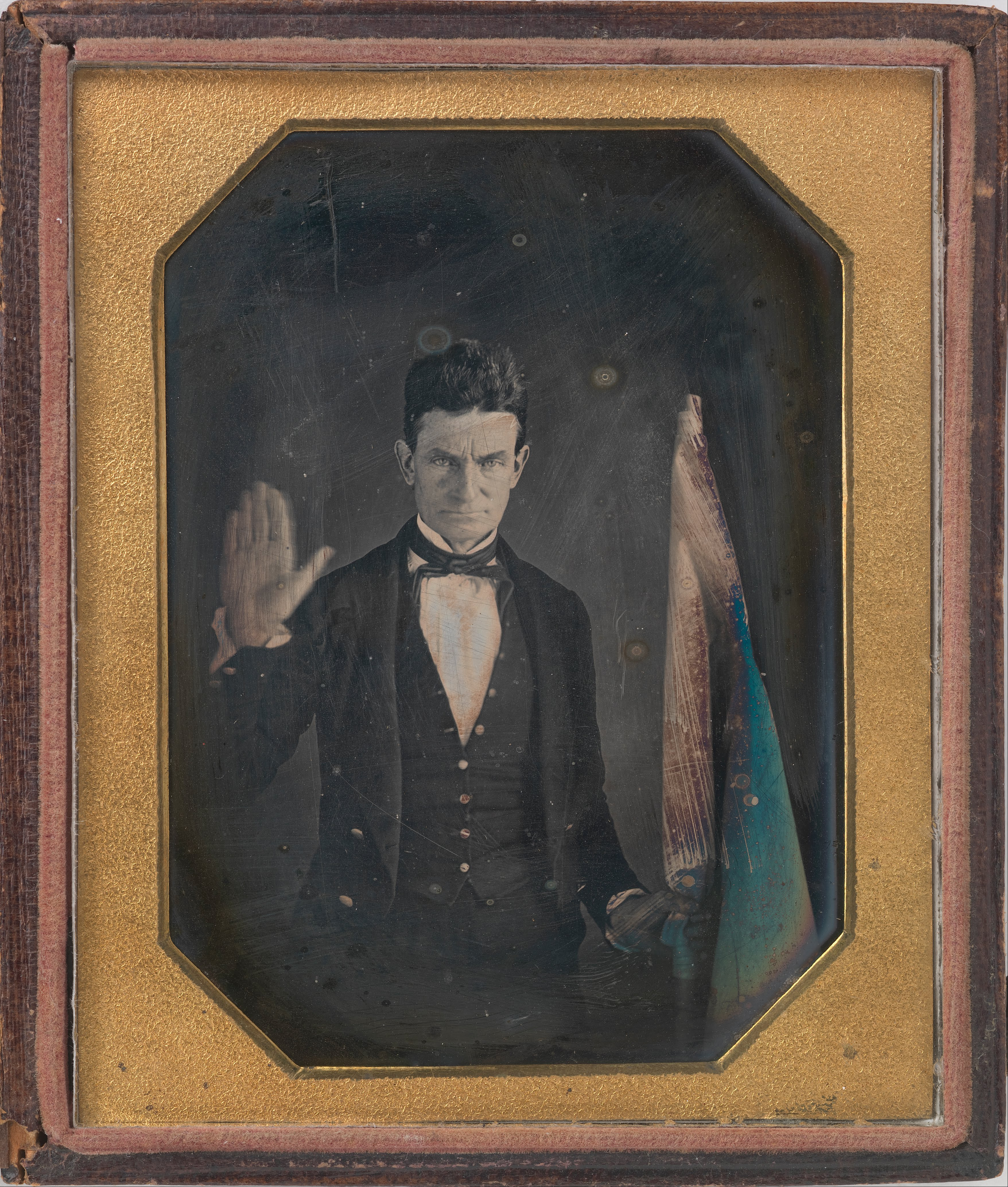
Radical abolitionist John Brown

In Kansas around 1855, the slavery issue reached a condition of intolerable tension and violence. But this was in an area where an overwhelming proportion of settlers were merely land-hungry Westerners indifferent to the public issues. The majority of the inhabitants were not concerned with sectional tensions or the issue of slavery. Instead, the tension in Kansas began as a contention between rival claimants. During the first wave of settlement, no one held titles to the land, and settlers rushed to occupy newly open land fit for cultivation. While the tension and violence did emerge as a pattern pitting Yankee and Missourian settlers against each other, there is little evidence of any ideological divides on the questions of slavery. Instead, the Missouri claimants, thinking of Kansas as their own domain, regarded the Yankee squatters as invaders, while the Yankees accused the Missourians of grabbing the best land without honestly settling on it.

However, the 1855–56 violence in "Bleeding Kansas" did reach an ideological climax after John Brown – regarded by followers as the instrument of God's will to destroy slavery – entered the melee. His assassination of five pro-slavery settlers (the so-called "Pottawatomie massacre", during the night of May 24, 1856) resulted in some irregular, guerrilla-style strife. Aside from John Brown's fervor, the strife in Kansas often involved only armed bands more interested in land claims or loot.

His zeal in the cause of freedom was infinitely superior to mine ... Mine was as the taper light; his was as the burning sun. I could live for the slave; John Brown could die for him.

— Frederick Douglass speaking of John Brown

Of greater importance than the civil strife in Kansas, however, was the reaction against it nationwide and in Congress. In both North and South, the belief was widespread that the aggressive designs of the other section were epitomized by (and responsible for) what was happening in Kansas. Consequently, "Bleeding Kansas" emerged as a symbol of sectional controversy.

Indignant over the developments in Kansas, the Republicans – the first entirely sectional major party in U.S. history – entered their first presidential campaign with confidence. Their nominee, John C. Frémont, was a generally safe candidate for the new party. Although his nomination upset some of their Nativist Know-Nothing supporters (his mother was a Catholic), the nomination of the famed explorer of the Far West and ex-senator from California with a short political record was an attempt to woo ex-Democrats. The other two Republican contenders, William H. Seward and Salmon P. Chase, were seen as too radical.

Nevertheless, the campaign of 1856 was waged almost exclusively on the slavery issue – pitted as a struggle between democracy and aristocracy – focusing on the question of Kansas. The Republicans condemned the Kansas–Nebraska Act and the expansion of slavery, but they advanced a program of internal improvements combining the idealism of anti-slavery with the economic aspirations of the North. The new party rapidly developed a powerful partisan culture, and energetic activists drove voters to the polls in unprecedented numbers. People reacted with fervor. Young Republicans organized the "Wide Awake" clubs and chanted "Free Soil, Free Labor, Free Men, Frémont!" With Southern Fire-Eaters and even some moderates uttering threats of secession if Frémont won, the Democratic candidate, Buchanan, benefited from apprehensions about the future of the Union.

Millard Fillmore, the candidate of the American Party (Know-Nothings) and the Silver Gray Whigs, said in a speech at Albany, New York, that the election of a Republican candidate would dissolve the Union. Abraham Lincoln replied on July 23 in a speech at Galena, Illinois; Carl Sandburg wrote that this speech probably resembled Lincoln's Lost Speech: "This Government would be very weak, indeed, if a majority, with a disciplined army and navy, and a well-filled treasury, could not preserve itself, when attacked by an unarmed, undisciplined, unorganized minority. All this talk about the dissolution of the Union is humbug – nothing but folly. We won't dissolve the Union, and you shan't."

=== Dred Scott decision (1857) and the Lecompton Constitution ===
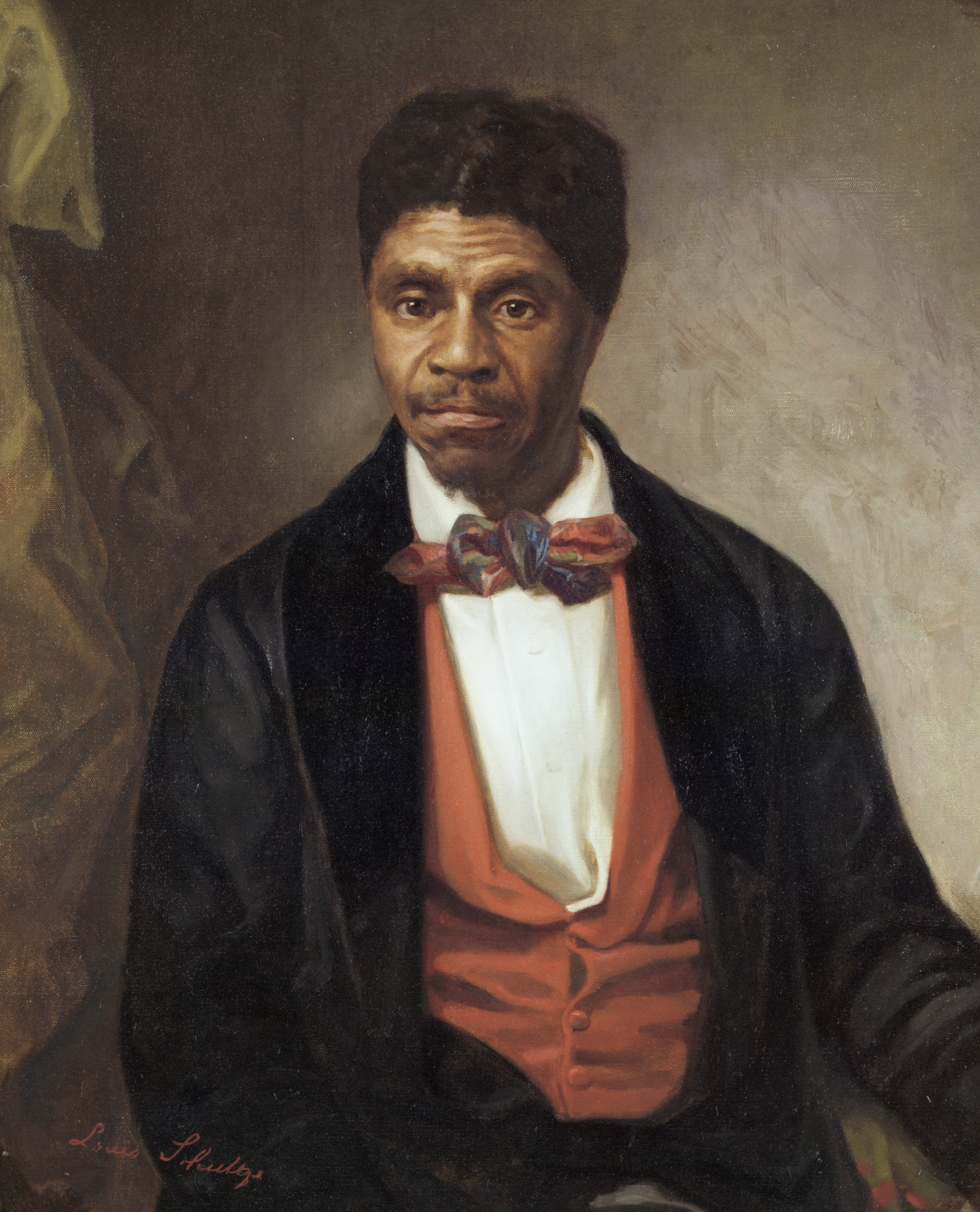
Slave Dred Scott

The Lecompton Constitution and Dred Scott v. Sandford (the respondent's name, Sanford, was misspelled in the reports) were both part of the Bleeding Kansas controversy over slavery that arose as a result of the Kansas–Nebraska Act, which was Stephen Douglas' attempt to replace the Missouri Compromise's ban on slavery in the Kansas and Nebraska territories with popular sovereignty, which would have allowed the people of a territory to vote for or against slavery. The Lecompton Constitution, which would have allowed slavery in Kansas, was the result of massive vote fraud by the pro-slavery border ruffians. Douglas defeated the Lecompton Constitution because it was supported by the minority of pro-slavery people in Kansas, and Douglas believed in majority rule. Douglas hoped that both the South and the North would support popular sovereignty, but neither did, as neither trusted Douglas.

The Supreme Court decision of 1857 in Dred Scott v. Sandford escalated the controversy. Chief Justice Roger B. Taney's decision said that blacks were "so far inferior that they had no rights which the white man was bound to respect," and that slavery could spread into the territories even if the majority of people in the territories were anti-slavery. Lincoln warned that "the next Dred Scott decision" could impose slavery on Northern states.

Historians agree that the decision dramatically inflamed tensions leading to the Civil War. In 2022 historian David W. Blight argued that the year 1857 was "the great pivot on the road to disunion...largely because of the Dred Scott case, which stoked the fear, distrust and conspiratorial hatred already common in both the North and the South to new levels of intensity."

=== Buchanan, Republicans and anti-administration Democrats ===
President James Buchanan decided to end the troubles in Kansas by urging Congress to admit Kansas as a slave state under the Lecompton Constitution. Kansas voters, however, soundly rejected this constitution by a vote of 10,226 to 138. As Buchanan directed his presidential authority to promoting the Lecompton Constitution, he further angered the Republicans and alienated members of his own party. Prompting their break with the administration, the Douglasites saw this scheme as an attempt to pervert the principle of popular sovereignty on which the Kansas–Nebraska Act was based. Nationwide, conservatives were incensed, feeling as though the principles of states' rights had been violated. Even in the South, ex-Whigs and border state Know-Nothings – most notably John Bell and John J. Crittenden (key figures in the event of sectional controversies) – urged the Republicans to oppose the administration's moves and take up the demand that the territories be given the power to accept or reject slavery.

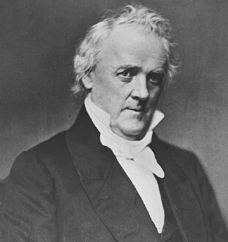
President James Buchanan

As the schism in the Democratic party deepened, moderate Republicans argued that an alliance with anti-administration Democrats, especially Stephen Douglas, would be a key advantage in the 1860 elections. Some Republican observers saw the controversy over the Lecompton Constitution as an opportunity to peel off Democratic support in the border states, where Frémont picked up little support. After all, the border states had often gone for Whigs with a Northern base of support in the past without prompting threats of Southern withdrawal from the Union.

Among the proponents of this strategy was The New York Times, which called on the Republicans to downplay opposition to popular sovereignty in favor of a compromise policy calling for "no more slave states" in order to quell sectional tensions. The Times maintained that for the Republicans to be competitive in the 1860 elections, they would need to broaden their base of support to include all voters who for one reason or another were upset with the Buchanan Administration.

Indeed, pressure was strong for an alliance that would unite the growing opposition to the Democratic Administration. But such an alliance was no novel idea; it would essentially entail transforming the Republicans into the national, conservative, Union party of the country. In effect, this would be a successor to the Whig party.

Republican leaders, however, staunchly opposed any attempts to modify the party position on slavery, appalled by what they considered a surrender of their principles when, for example, all the ninety-two Republican members of Congress voted for the Crittenden-Montgomery bill in 1858. Although this compromise measure blocked Kansas' entry into the union as a slave state, the fact that it called for popular sovereignty, instead of rejecting slavery altogether, was troubling to the party leaders.

In the end, the Crittenden-Montgomery bill did not create a grand anti-administration coalition of Republicans, ex-Whig Southerners in the border states, and Northern Democrats. Instead, the Democratic Party merely split along sectional lines. Anti-Lecompton Democrats complained that certain leaders had imposed a pro-slavery policy upon the party. The Douglasites, however, refused to yield to administration pressure. Like the anti-Nebraska Democrats, who were now members of the Republican Party, the Douglasites insisted that they – not the administration – commanded the support of most northern Democrats.

Extremist sentiment in the South advanced dramatically as the Southern planter class perceived its hold on the executive, legislative, and judicial apparatuses of the central government wane. It also grew increasingly difficult for Southern Democrats to manipulate power in many of the Northern states through their allies in the Democratic Party.

=== Honor ===
Historians have emphasized that the sense of honor was a central concern of upper-class white Southerners. The idea of being treated like a second-class citizen was anathema and could not be tolerated by an honorable southerner. The abolitionist position held that slavery was a negative or evil phenomenon that damaged the rights of white men and the prospects of republicanism. To the white South this rhetoric made Southerners second-class citizens because it trampled what they believed was their Constitutional right to take their chattel property anywhere.

==== Assault on Sumner (1856) ====
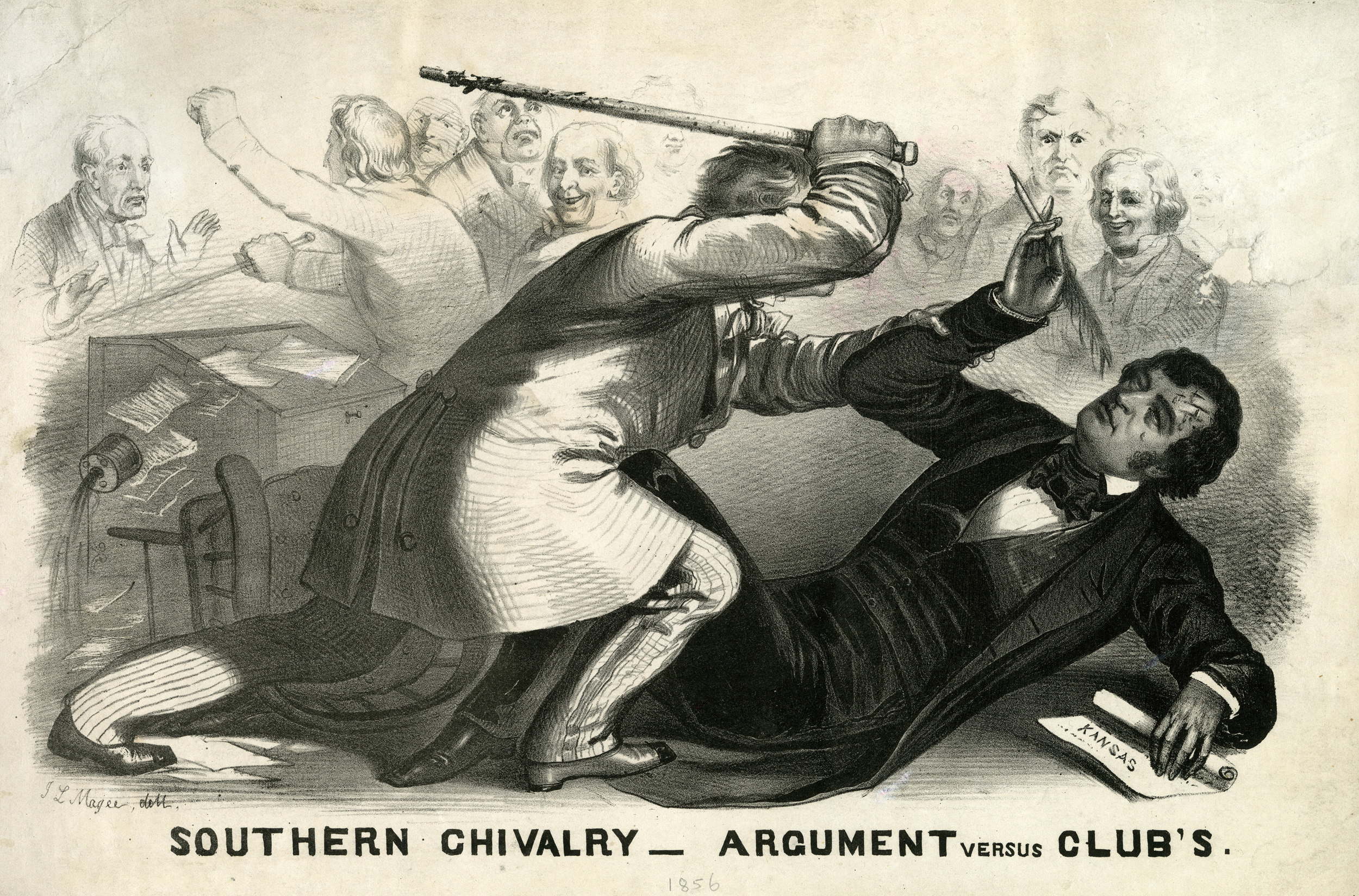
Northern image of the 1856 attack on Sumner

On May 19 Massachusetts Senator Charles Sumner gave a long speech in the Senate entitled "The Crime Against Kansas", which condemned the Slave Power as the evil force behind the nation's troubles. Sumner said the Southerners had committed a "crime against Kansas", singling out Senator Andrew P. Butler of South Carolina. Sumner famously cast the South Carolinian as having "chosen a mistress ... who, though ugly to others, is always lovely to him; though polluted in the sight of the world, is chaste in his sight – I mean the harlot, slavery!" According to Williamjames Hull Hoffer, "It is also important to note the sexual imagery that recurred throughout the oration, which was neither accidental nor without precedent. Abolitionists routinely accused slaveholders of maintaining slavery so that they could engage in forcible sexual relations with their slaves." Three days later, Sumner, working at his desk on the Senate floor, was beaten almost to death by Congressman Preston S. Brooks, Butler's nephew. Sumner took years to recover; he became the martyr to the antislavery cause and said that the episode proved the barbarism of slave society. Brooks was lauded as a hero upholding Southern honor. The episode further polarized North and South, strengthened the new Republican Party, and added a new element of violence on the floor of Congress.

== Emergence of Lincoln ==
=== Republican Party structure ===
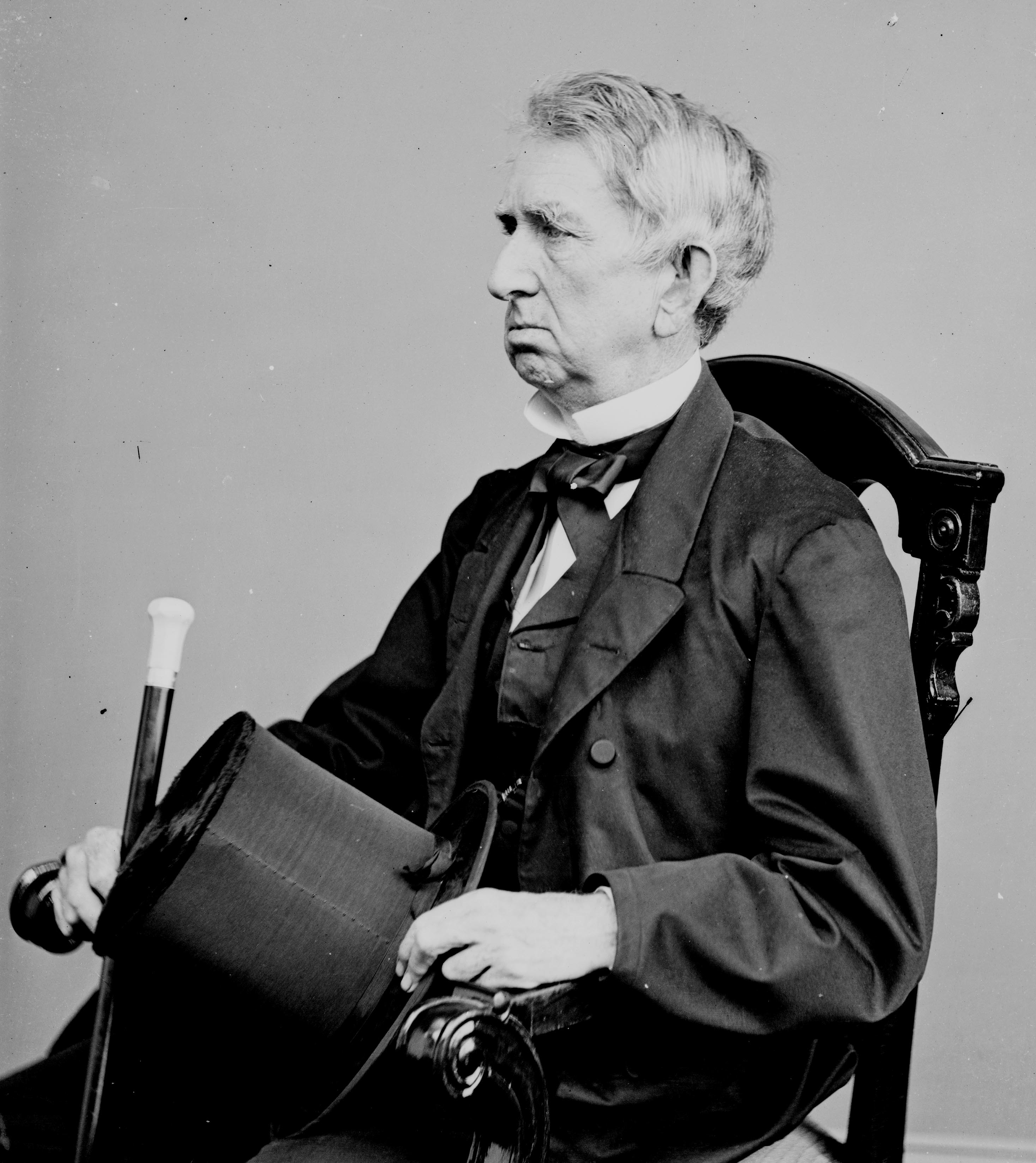
William H. Seward, Secretary of State under Abraham Lincoln and Andrew Johnson

Despite their significant loss in the election of 1856, Republican leaders realized that even though they appealed only to Northern voters, they needed to win only two more states, such as Pennsylvania and Illinois, to win the presidency in 1860.

As the Democrats were grappling with their own troubles, leaders in the Republican party fought to keep elected members focused on the issue of slavery in the West, which allowed them to mobilize popular support. Chase wrote Sumner that if the conservatives succeeded, it might be necessary to recreate the Free Soil Party. He was also particularly disturbed by the tendency of many Republicans to eschew moral attacks on slavery for political and economic arguments.

The controversy over slavery in the West was still not creating a fixation on the issue of slavery. Although the old restraints on the sectional tensions were being eroded with the rapid extension of mass politics and mass democracy in the North, the perpetuation of conflict over the issue of slavery in the West still required the efforts of radical Democrats in the South and radical Republicans in the North. They had to ensure that the sectional conflict would remain at the center of the political debate.

William Seward contemplated this potential in the 1840s, when the Democrats were the nation's majority party, usually controlling Congress, the presidency, and many state offices. The country's institutional structure and party system allowed slaveholders to prevail in more of the nation's territories and to garner a great deal of influence over national policy. With growing popular discontent with the unwillingness of many Democratic leaders to take a stand against slavery, and growing consciousness of the party's increasingly pro-Southern stance, Seward became convinced that the only way for the Whig Party to counteract the Democrats' strong monopoly of the rhetoric of democracy and equality was for the Whigs to embrace anti-slavery as a party platform. Once again, to increasing numbers of Northerners, the Southern labor system was increasingly seen as contrary to the ideals of American democracy.

Republicans believed in the existence of "the Slave Power Conspiracy", which had seized control of the federal government and was attempting to pervert the Constitution for its own purposes. The "Slave Power" idea gave the Republicans the anti-aristocratic appeal with which men like Seward had long wished to be associated politically. By fusing older anti-slavery arguments with the idea that slavery posed a threat to Northern free labor and democratic values, it enabled the Republicans to tap into the egalitarian outlook which lay at the heart of Northern society.

In this sense, during the 1860 presidential campaign, Republican orators even cast "Honest Abe" as an embodiment of these principles, repeatedly referring to him as "the child of labor" and "son of the frontier", who had proved how "honest industry and toil" were rewarded in the North. Although Lincoln had been a Whig, the "Wide Awakes" (members of the Republican clubs) used replicas of rails that he had split to remind voters of his humble origins.

In almost every northern state, organizers attempted to have a Republican Party or an anti-Nebraska fusion movement on ballots in 1854. In areas where the radical Republicans controlled the new organization, the comprehensive radical program became the party policy. Just as they helped organize the Republican Party in the summer of 1854, the radicals played an important role in the national organization of the party in 1856. Republican conventions in New York, Massachusetts, and Illinois adopted radical platforms. These radical platforms in such states as Wisconsin, Michigan, Maine, and Vermont usually called for the divorce of the government from slavery, the repeal of the Fugitive Slave Laws, and no more slave states, as did platforms in Pennsylvania, Minnesota, and Massachusetts when radical influence was high.

Conservatives at the Republican 1860 nominating convention in Chicago were able to block the nomination of William Seward, who had an earlier reputation as a radical (but by 1860 had been criticized by Horace Greeley as being too moderate). Other candidates had earlier joined or formed parties opposing the Whigs and had thereby made enemies of many delegates. Lincoln was selected on the third ballot. However, conservatives were unable to bring about the resurrection of "Whiggery". The convention's resolutions regarding slavery were roughly the same as they had been in 1856, but the language appeared less radical. In the following months, even Republican conservatives like Thomas Ewing and Edward Baker embraced the platform language that "the normal condition of territories was freedom". All in all, the organizers had done an effective job of shaping the official policy of the Republican Party.

Southern slaveholding interests now faced the prospects of a Republican president and the entry of new free states that would alter the nation's balance of power between the sections. To many Southerners, the resounding defeat of the Lecompton Constitution foreshadowed the entry of more free states into the Union. Dating back to the Missouri Compromise, the Southern region desperately sought to maintain an equal balance of slave states and free states so as to be competitive in the Senate. Since the last slave state was admitted in 1845, five more free states had entered. The tradition of maintaining a balance between North and South was abandoned in favor of the addition of more free soil states.

=== Sectional battles over federal policy in the late 1850s ===
==== Lincoln–Douglas Debates ====
The Lincoln-Douglas debates were a series of seven debates in 1858 between Stephen Douglas, United States senator from Illinois, and Abraham Lincoln, the Republican who sought to replace Douglas in the Senate. The debates were mainly about slavery. Douglas defended his Kansas–Nebraska Act, which replaced the Missouri Compromise ban on slavery in the Louisiana Purchase territory north and west of Missouri with popular sovereignty, which allowed residents of territories such as the Kansas to vote either for or against slavery. Douglas put Lincoln on the defensive by accusing him of being a Black Republican abolitionist, but Lincoln responded by asking Douglas to reconcile popular sovereignty with the Dred Scott decision. Douglas' Freeport Doctrine was that residents of a territory could keep slavery out by refusing to pass a slave code and other laws needed to protect slavery. Douglas' Freeport Doctrine, and the fact that he helped defeat the pro-slavery Lecompton Constitution, made Douglas unpopular in the South, which led to the 1860 split of the Democratic Party into Northern and Southern wings. The Democrats retained control of the Illinois legislature, and Douglas thus retained his seat in the U.S. Senate (at that time senators were elected by the state legislatures, not by popular vote); however, Lincoln's national profile was greatly raised, paving the way for his election as president of the United States two years later.

==== Background ====
In The Rise of American Civilization (1927), Charles and Mary Beard argue that slavery was not so much a social or cultural institution as an economic one (a labor system). The Beards cited inherent conflicts between Northeastern finance, manufacturing, and commerce and Southern plantations, which competed to control the federal government so as to protect their own interests. According to the economic determinists of the era, both groups used arguments over slavery and states' rights as a cover.

Recent historians have rejected the Beardian thesis. But their economic determinism has influenced subsequent historians in important ways. Time on the Cross: The Economics of American Negro Slavery (1974) by Robert William Fogel (who would win the 1993 Nobel Memorial Prize in Economic Sciences) and Stanley L. Engerman, wrote that slavery was profitable and that the price of slaves would have continued to rise. Modernization theorists, such as Raimondo Luraghi, have argued that as the Industrial Revolution was expanding on a worldwide scale, the days of wrath were coming for a series of agrarian, pre-capitalistic, "backward" societies throughout the world, from the Italian and American South to India. But most American historians point out the South was highly developed and on average about as prosperous as the North.

==== Panic of 1857 and sectional realignments ====
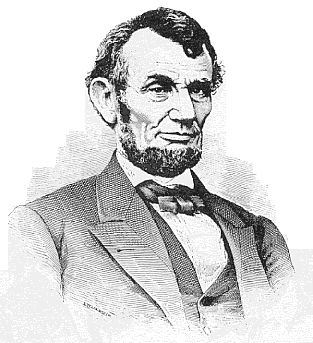
"Vote yourself a farm – vote yourself a tariff": a campaign slogan for Abraham Lincoln in 1860

A few historians believe that the serious financial Panic of 1857 and the economic difficulties leading up to it strengthened the Republican Party and heightened sectional tensions. Before the panic, strong economic growth was being achieved under relatively low tariffs. Hence much of the nation concentrated on growth and prosperity.

The iron and textile industries were facing acute, worsening trouble each year after 1850. By 1854, stocks of iron were accumulating in each world market. Iron prices fell, forcing many American iron mills to shut down.

Republicans urged western farmers and northern manufacturers to blame the depression on the domination of the low-tariff economic policies of southern-controlled Democratic administrations. However, the depression revived suspicion of Northeastern banking interests in both the South and the West. Eastern demand for western farm products shifted the West closer to the North. As the "transportation revolution" (canals and railroads) went forward, an increasingly large share and absolute amount of wheat, corn, and other staples of western producers – once difficult to haul across the Appalachians – went to markets in the Northeast. The depression emphasized the value of the western markets for eastern goods and homesteaders who would furnish markets and respectable profits.

Aside from the land issue, economic difficulties strengthened the Republican case for higher tariffs for industries in response to the depression. This issue was important in Pennsylvania and perhaps New Jersey.

==== Southern response ====
Meanwhile, many Southerners grumbled over "radical" notions of giving land away to farmers that would "abolitionize" the area. While the ideology of Southern sectionalism was well-developed before the Panic of 1857 by figures like J.D.B. De Bow, the panic helped convince even more cotton barons that they had grown too reliant on Eastern financial interests.

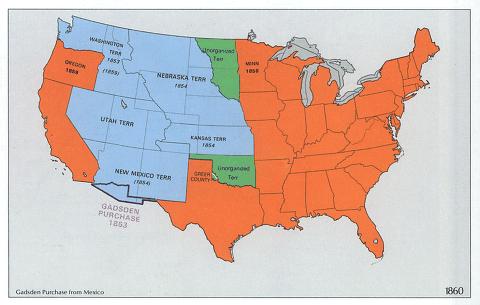
The United States, immediately before the Civil War. All of the lands east of, or bordering, the Mississippi River were organized as states in the Union, but the West was still largely unsettled.

Thomas Prentice Kettell, former editor of the Democratic Review, was another commentator popular in the South to enjoy a great degree of prominence between 1857 and 1860. Kettell gathered an array of statistics in his book on Southern Wealth and Northern Profits, to show that the South produced vast wealth, while the North, with its dependence on raw materials, siphoned off the wealth of the South. Arguing that sectional inequality resulted from the concentration of manufacturing in the North, and from the North's supremacy in communications, transportation, finance, and international trade, his ideas paralleled old physiocratic doctrines that all profits of manufacturing and trade come out of the land. Political sociologists, such as Barrington Moore, have noted that these forms of romantic nostalgia tend to arise when industrialization takes hold.

Such Southern hostility to the free farmers gave the North an opportunity for an alliance with Western farmers. After the political realignments of 1857–58 – manifested by the emerging strength of the Republican Party and their networks of local support nationwide – almost every issue was entangled with the controversy over the expansion of slavery in the West. While questions of tariffs, banking policy, public land, and subsidies to railroads did not always unite all elements in the North and the Northwest against the interests of slaveholders in the South under the pre-1854 party system, they were translated in terms of sectional conflict – with the expansion of slavery in the West involved.

As the depression strengthened the Republican Party, slaveholding interests were becoming convinced that the North had aggressive and hostile designs on the Southern way of life. The South was thus increasingly fertile ground for secessionism.

The Republicans' Whig-style personality-driven "hurrah" campaign helped stir hysteria in the slave states upon the emergence of Lincoln and intensify divisive tendencies, while Southern "fire eaters" gave credence to notions of the slave power conspiracy among Republican constituencies in the North and West. New Southern demands to re-open the African slave trade further fueled sectional tensions.

From the early 1840s until the outbreak of the Civil War, the cost of slaves had been rising steadily. Meanwhile, the price of cotton was experiencing market fluctuations typical of raw commodities. After the Panic of 1857, the price of cotton fell while the price of slaves continued its steep rise. At the 1858 Southern commercial convention, William L. Yancey of Alabama called for the reopening of the African slave trade. Only the delegates from the states of the Upper South, who profited from the domestic trade, opposed the reopening of the slave trade since they saw it as a potential form of competition. The convention in 1858 wound up voting to recommend the repeal of all laws against slave imports, despite some reservations.

=== John Brown and Harpers Ferry (1859) ===
On October 16, 1859, radical abolitionist John Brown led an attempt to start an armed slave revolt by seizing the U.S. Army arsenal at Harper's Ferry, Virginia (now West Virginia). Brown and twenty-one followers, including whites (three of whom were Brown's sons) and Blacks (three free Blacks, one freedman, and one fugitive slave), planned to seize the armory and use weapons stored there to arm Black slaves in order to spark a general uprising by the slave population.

Although the raiders were initially successful in cutting the telegraph line and capturing the Armory, they allowed a passing train to continue, and at the next station with a working telegraph the conductor alerted authorities to the attack. The raiders were forced by the militia and other locals to barricade themselves in the Armory, in a sturdy building later known as John Brown's Fort. Robert E. Lee (then a colonel in the U.S. Army) led a company of U.S. Marines in storming the armory on October 18. Ten of the raiders were killed, including two of Brown's sons; Brown himself along with a half dozen of his followers were captured; five of the raiders escaped immediate capture. Six locals were killed and nine injured; the Marines suffered one dead and one injured.

Brown was subsequently hanged by the state of Virginia for treason, murder, and inciting a slave insurrection, as were six of his followers. (See John Brown's raiders.) The raid, trial, and execution were covered in great detail by the press, which sent reporters and sketch artists to the scene on the next train. It immediately became a cause célèbre in both the North and the South, with Brown vilified by Southerners as a bloodthirsty fanatic, but celebrated by many Northern abolitionists as a martyr to the cause of ending slavery.

=== Elections of 1860 ===
1860 electoral map

Initially, William H. Seward of New York, Salmon P. Chase of Ohio, and Simon Cameron of Pennsylvania were the leading contenders for the Republican presidential nomination. But Abraham Lincoln, a former one-term House member who gained fame amid the Lincoln–Douglas debates of 1858, had fewer political opponents within the party and outmaneuvered the other contenders. On May 16, 1860, he received the Republican nomination at their convention in Chicago.

The schism in the Democratic Party over the Lecompton Constitution and Douglas' Freeport Doctrine caused Southern "Fire-Eaters" to oppose front runner Stephen A. Douglas' bid for the Democratic presidential nomination. Douglas defeated the pro-slavery Lecompton Constitution for Kansas because the majority of Kansans were antislavery, and Douglas' popular sovereignty doctrine would allow the majority to vote slavery up or down as they chose. Douglas' Freeport Doctrine alleged that the antislavery majority of Kansans could thwart the Dred Scott decision that allowed slavery by withholding legislation for a slave code and other laws needed to protect slavery. As a result, Southern extremists demanded a slave code for the territories, and used this issue to divide the northern and southern wings of the Democratic Party. Southerners left the party and in June nominated John C. Breckinridge, while Northern Democrats supported Douglas. As a result, the Southern planter class lost a considerable measure of sway in national politics. Because of the Democrats' division, the Republican nominee faced a divided opposition. Adding to Lincoln's advantage, ex-Whigs from the border states had earlier formed the Constitutional Union Party, nominating John C. Bell for president. Thus, party nominees waged regional campaigns. Douglas and Lincoln competed for Northern votes, while Bell, Douglas and Breckinridge competed for Southern votes.

==== Result and impact of the election of 1860 ====
Lincoln handily won the electoral votes:

- Abraham Lincoln: 180 (40% of the popular vote)
- J.C. Breckinridge: 72 (18% of the popular vote)
- John Bell: 39 (13% of the popular vote)
- Stephen A. Douglas: 12 (30% of the popular vote)

Voting [on November 6, 1860] split sharply along sectional lines. Lincoln was elected by carrying the electoral votes of the North; he had a sweeping majority of 180 electoral votes. Given the vote count in each state, he would still have won the electoral college even if all three opponents had somehow been able to merge their tickets.

=== Split in the Democratic Party ===
The Alabama extremist William Lowndes Yancey's demand for a federal slave code for the territories split the Democratic Party between North and South, which made the election of Lincoln possible. Yancey tried to make his demand for a slave code moderate enough to get Southern support and yet extreme enough to enrage Northerners and split the party. He demanded that the party support a slave code for the territories if later necessary, so that the demand would be conditional enough to win Southern support. His tactic worked, and lower South delegates left the Democratic Convention at Institute Hall in Charleston, South Carolina, and walked over to Military Hall. The South Carolina extremist Robert Barnwell Rhett hoped that the lower South would completely break with the Northern Democrats and attend a separate convention at Richmond, Virginia, but lower South delegates gave the national Democrats one last chance at unification by going to the convention at Baltimore, Maryland, before the split became permanent. The result was that John C. Breckinridge became the candidate of the Southern Democrats, and Stephen Douglas became the candidate of the Northern Democrats.

Yancey's previous 1848 attempt at demanding a slave code for the territories was his Alabama Platform, which was in response to the Northern Wilmot Proviso attempt at banning slavery in territories conquered from Mexico. Justice Peter V. Daniel wrote a letter about the Proviso to former president Martin Van Buren: "It is that view of the case which pretends to an insulting exclusiveness or superiority on the one hand, and denounces a degrading inequality or inferiority on the other; which says in effect to the Southern man, 'Avaunt! you are not my equal, and hence are to be excluded as carrying a moral taint with you.' Here is at once the extinction of all fraternity, of all sympathy, of all endurance even; the creation of animosity fierce, implacable, undying." Both the Alabama Platform and the Wilmot Proviso failed, but Yancey learned to be less overtly radical in order to get more support. Southerners thought they were merely demanding equality, in that they wanted Southern property in slaves to get the same (or more) protection as Northern forms of property.

=== Southern secession ===
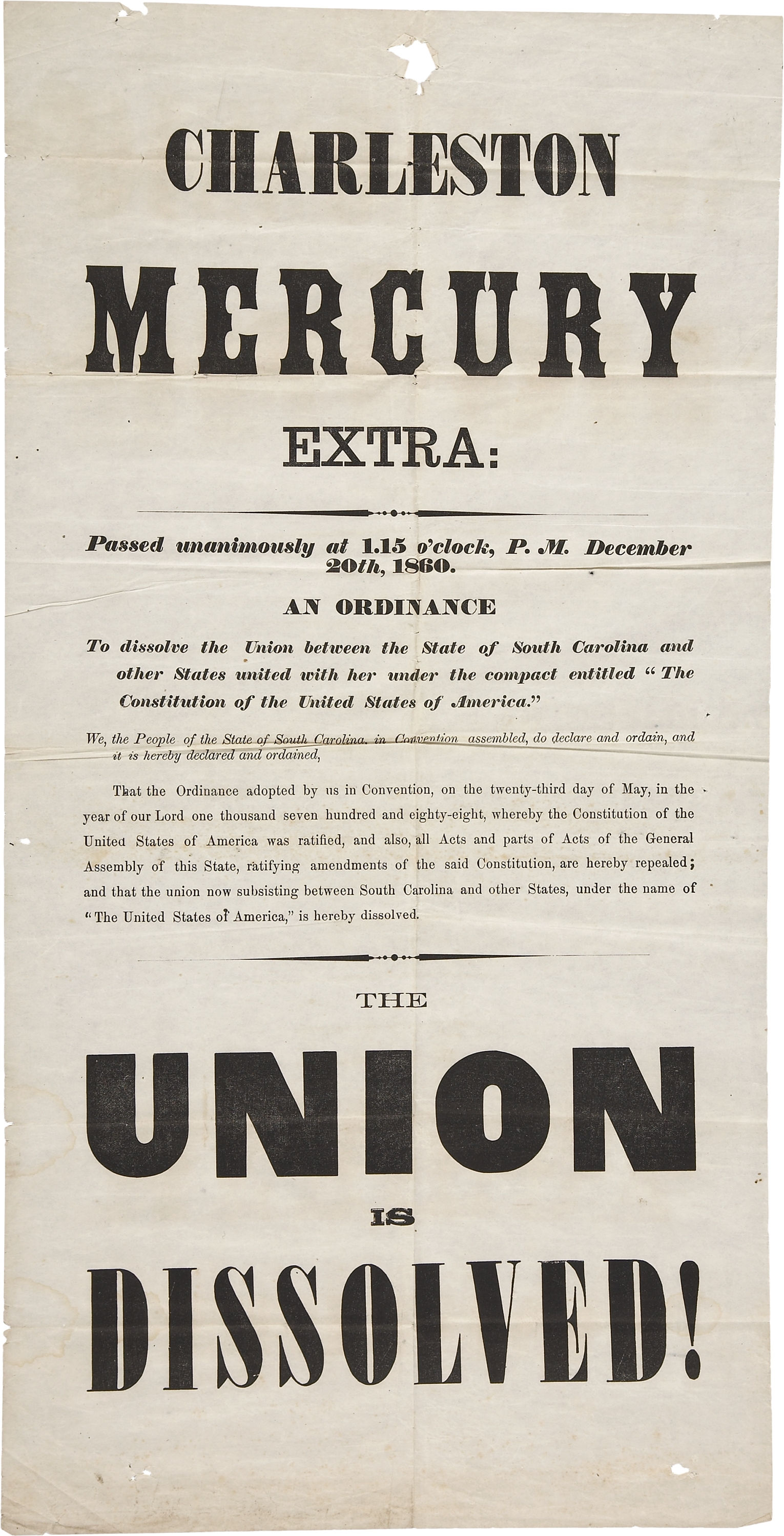
The first published Confederate imprint of secession

With the emergence of the Republicans as the nation's first major sectional party by the mid-1850s, politics became the stage on which sectional tensions were played out. Although much of the West – the focal point of sectional tensions – was unfit for cotton cultivation, Southern secessionists read the political fallout as a sign that their power in national politics was rapidly weakening. Before, the slave system had been buttressed to an extent by the Democratic Party, which was increasingly seen as representing a more pro-Southern position that unfairly permitted Southerners to prevail in the nation's territories and to dominate national policy before the Civil War. But Democrats suffered a significant reverse in the electoral realignment of the mid-1850s. 1860 was a critical election that marked a stark change in existing patterns of party loyalties among groups of voters; Abraham Lincoln's election was a watershed in the balance of power of competing national and parochial interests and affiliations.

Immediately after finding out the election results, a special South Carolina convention declared "that the Union now subsisting between South Carolina and other states under the name of the 'United States of America' is hereby dissolved;" by February six more cotton states would follow (Mississippi, Florida, Alabama, Georgia, Louisiana, Texas), forming the Confederate States of America. In 1960, Lipset examined the secessionist vote in each Southern state in 1860–61. In each state he divided the counties by the proportion of slaves, low, medium and high. He found that in the 181 high-slavery counties, the vote was 72% for secession. In the 205 low-slavery counties, the vote was only 37% for secession, and in the 153 middle counties, the vote for secession was at 60%. Both the outgoing Buchanan administration and the incoming Lincoln administration refused to recognize the legality of secession or the legitimacy of the Confederacy. After Lincoln called for troops, four border states (that lacked cotton) seceded (Virginia, Arkansas, North Carolina, Tennessee). The Upper Southern States were in a dilemma: they wanted to retain their slaves but were afraid that if they joined with the lower southern states that were rebelling they would be caught in the middle of a conflict, and their states would be the battle ground. By staying in the Union the Upper Southern states felt that their slave rights would continue to be recognized by the Union.

=== Other issues ===
The tariff issue was and is sometimes cited – long after the war – by Lost Cause historians and neo-Confederate apologists. In 1860–61 none of the groups that proposed compromises to head off secession brought up the tariff issue as a major issue. Pamphleteers North and South rarely mentioned the tariff, and when some did, for instance, Matthew Fontaine Maury and John Lothrop Motley, they were generally writing for a foreign audience.

The tariff in effect prior to the enactment of the Morrill Tariff of 1861 had been written and approved by the South for the benefit of the South. Complaints came from the Northeast (especially Pennsylvania) and regarded the rates as too low. Some Southerners feared that eventually the North would grow so big that it would control Congress and could raise the tariff at will.

As for states' rights, while a state's right of revolution mentioned in the Declaration of Independence was based on the inalienable equal rights of man, secessionists believed in a modified version of states' rights that was safe for slavery.

These issues were especially important in the lower South, where 47 percent of the population were slaves. The upper South, where 32 percent of the population were slaves, considered the Fort Sumter crisis – especially Lincoln's call for militiamen to march south to recapture it – a cause for secession. The northernmost border slave states, where 13 percent of the population were slaves, did not secede.

== The war begins ==
The American Civil War began on April 12, 1861, when Confederate forces opened fire on the Union-held Fort Sumter. The loss of Fort Sumter lit a patriotic fire under the North. On April 15, Lincoln called on the states to field 75,000 militiamen for 90 days; impassioned Union states met the quotas quickly. On May 3, 1861, Lincoln called for an additional 42,000 volunteers for three years. Shortly after this, Virginia, Tennessee, Arkansas, and North Carolina seceded and joined the Confederacy. An overwhelming demand for war swept both the North and South, with only Kentucky attempting to remain neutral.

== Historiographical debates on causes ==
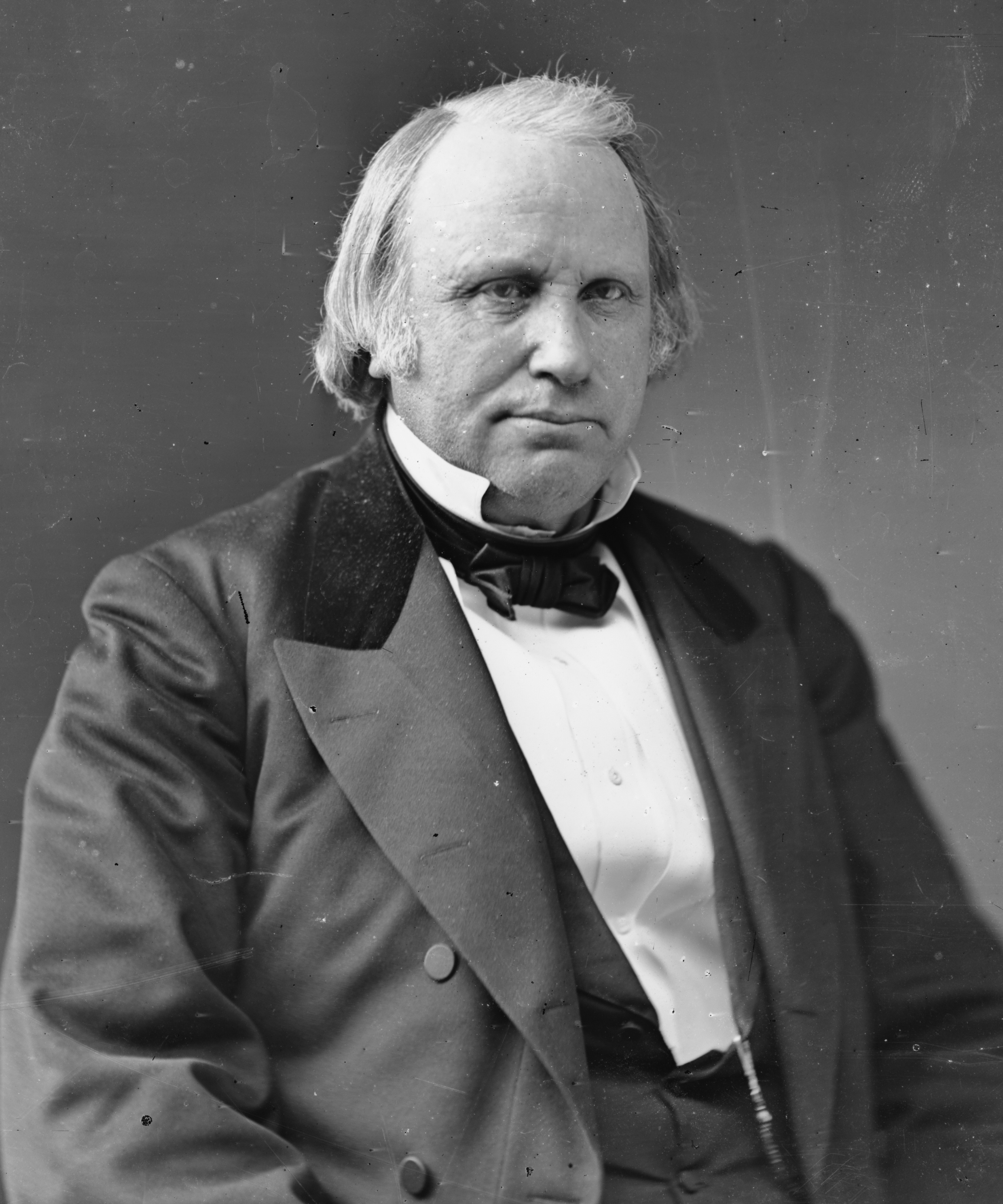
Henry Wilson, author of History of The Rise and Fall of the Slave Power in America (1872–1877)

Abraham Lincoln's rejection of the Crittenden Compromise, the failure to secure the ratification of the Corwin Amendment in 1861, and the inability of the Washington Peace Conference of 1861 to provide an effective alternative to Crittenden and Corwin came together to prevent a compromise that is still debated by Civil War historians. Even as the war was going on, William Seward and James Buchanan were outlining a debate over the question of inevitability that would continue among historians.

=== Needless war argument ===
Two competing explanations of the sectional tensions inflaming the nation emerged even before the war. The first was the "Needless War" argument. Buchanan believed the sectional hostility to be the accidental, unnecessary work of self-interested or fanatical agitators. He also singled out the "fanaticism" of the Republican Party. Seward, on the other hand, believed there to be an irrepressible conflict between opposing and enduring forces. Shelden argues that, "Few scholars in the twenty-first century would call the Civil War 'needless,' as the emancipation of 4 million slaves hinged on Union victory."

=== Irrepressible conflict argument ===
The "Irrepressible Conflict" argument was the first to dominate historical discussion. In the first decades after the fighting, histories of the Civil War generally reflected the views of Northerners who had participated in the conflict. The war appeared to be a stark moral conflict in which the South was to blame, a conflict that arose as a result of the designs of slave power. Henry Wilson's History of the Rise and Fall of the Slave Power in America (1872–1877) is the foremost representative of this moral interpretation, which argued that Northerners had fought to preserve the union against the aggressive designs of "slave power". Later, in his seven-volume History of the United States from the Compromise of 1850 to the Civil War (1893–1900), James Ford Rhodes identified slavery as the central – and virtually only – cause of the Civil War. The North and South had reached positions on the issue of slavery that were both irreconcilable and unalterable. The conflict had become inevitable.

=== Revisionists ===
The idea that the war was avoidable became central among historians in the 1920s, 1930s and 1940s. Revisionist historians, led by James G. Randall (1881–1953) at the University of Illinois, Woodrow Wilson (1856–1924) at Princeton University and Avery Craven (1885–1980) at the University of Chicago, saw in the social and economic systems of the South no differences so fundamental as to require a war. Historian Mark Neely explains their position:

Revisionism challenged the view that fundamental and irreconcilable sectional differences made the outbreak of war inevitable. It scorned a previous generation's easy identification of the Northern cause with abolition, but it continued a tradition of hostility to the Reconstruction measures that followed the war. The Civil War became a needless conflict brought on by a blundering generation that exaggerated sectional differences between North and South. Revisionists revived the reputation of the Democratic party as great nationalists before the war and as dependable loyalists during it. Revisionism gave Lincoln's Presidency a tragic beginning at Fort Sumter, a rancorous political setting of bitter factional conflicts between radicals and moderates within Lincoln's own party, and an even more tragic ending. The benevolent Lincoln died at the moment when benevolence was most needed to blunt radical designs for revenge on the South.

Randall blamed the ineptitude of a "blundering generation" of leaders. He also saw slavery as essentially a benign institution, crumbling in the presence of 19th century tendencies. Craven, the other leading revisionist, placed more emphasis on the issue of slavery than Randall but argued roughly the same points. In The Coming of the Civil War (1942), Craven argued that slave laborers were not much worse off than Northern workers, that the institution was already on the road to ultimate extinction, and that the war could have been averted by skillful and responsible leaders in the tradition of Congressional statesmen Henry Clay and Daniel Webster. Two of the key leaders in antebellum politics, Clay and Webster, in contrast to the 1850s generation of leaders, shared a predisposition to compromises marked by a passionate patriotic devotion to the Union.

But it is possible that the politicians of the 1850s were not inept. More recent studies have kept elements of the revisionist interpretation alive, emphasizing the role of political agitation (the efforts of Democratic politicians of the South and Republican politicians in the North to keep the sectional conflict at the center of the political debate). David Herbert Donald (1920–2009), a student of Randall, argued in 1960 that the politicians of the 1850s were not unusually inept but that they were operating in a society in which traditional restraints were being eroded in the face of the rapid extension of democracy. The stability of the two-party system kept the union together, but would collapse in the 1850s, thus reinforcing, rather than suppressing, sectional conflict. The union, Donald said, died of democracy.

== See also ==
- Compensated emancipation
- Conclusion of the American Civil War
- Timeline of events leading to the American Civil War
