= Thomas Kettell =

American political economist, magazine editor, and author

Thomas Prentice Kettell (born 1811, died October 22, 1878) was a 19th-century American political economist, magazine editor, and author. He was a well-known economic commentator from the 1840s through the American Civil War.

Kettell wrote for the New York Herald starting in 1835 as a financial columnist. He also wrote for Hunt's Magazine and later edited The United States Magazine and Democratic Review.

He founded United States Economist in 1852. The magazine later expanded its title to United States Economist, Dry Good Reporter, and Bank, Railroad and Commercial Chronicle.

He had some success in styling his magazines as American competitors to the British publication The Economist.

In 1856, Kettell authored Southern Wealth and Northern Profits, a lengthy statistical pamphlet about the economies of the Northern and Southern regions. The book received wide acclaim among secessionists in the South and much derision from anti-slavery politicians in the North, even though Kettell intended it as an argument that the two regions were economically dependent upon each other.

In 1866, Kettell authored one of the earliest histories of the recent Civil War, entitled A History of the Great Rebellion

Not much is known of his life after the war. He relocated to San Francisco in the late 1860s, and died there in 1878.

== Works ==
- Thomas Prentice Kettell (1861). Southern Wealth and Northern Profits, as exhibited in statistical facts and official figures: showing the necessity of Union to the future prosperity and welfare of the Republic. Van Evrie, Horton & Company. ISBN 9780608415291.
- Thomas Prentice Kettell (1866). History of the Great Rebellion: From Its Commencement to Its Close, Giving an Account of Its Origin, the Secession of the Southern States and the Formation of the Confederate Government, the Concentration of the Military and Financial Resources of the Federal Government; from Official Sources. L. Stebbins.
