= Chazal (disambiguation) =

Chazal may refer to

- Chazal House, American Greek Revival house
- Chazal (Judaism), Jewish sages
- Les Hauts-de-Chazal, urban area in the west of Besançon, France
- Chazal (cycling team), French cycling team
  - List of wins by Chazal and its successors

== People ==
- Antoine Chazal
- Antoine Toussaint de Chazal
- Antonio Ahualli de Chazal
- Astrid Chazal
- Charles Camille Chazal
- Claire Chazal
- Denise De Chazal
- Malcolm de Chazal
- Maxime Chazal
- Pierre Emmanuel Félix Chazal
- René Héctor Émile Chazal
- Robert Chazal

== See also ==
- Chahzal
