= Hazoumé =

Hazoumé is a surname. Notable people with the surname include:

- Flore Hazoumé, Congolese writer
- Guy Landry Hazoumé, Beninese politician and poet
- Paul Hazoumé, Beninese writer, educator, ethnologist, and politician
- Romuald Hazoumè, Beninese artist and sculptor
