= Augustus Taft House =

Coordinates: 32°47′08″N 79°55′50″W

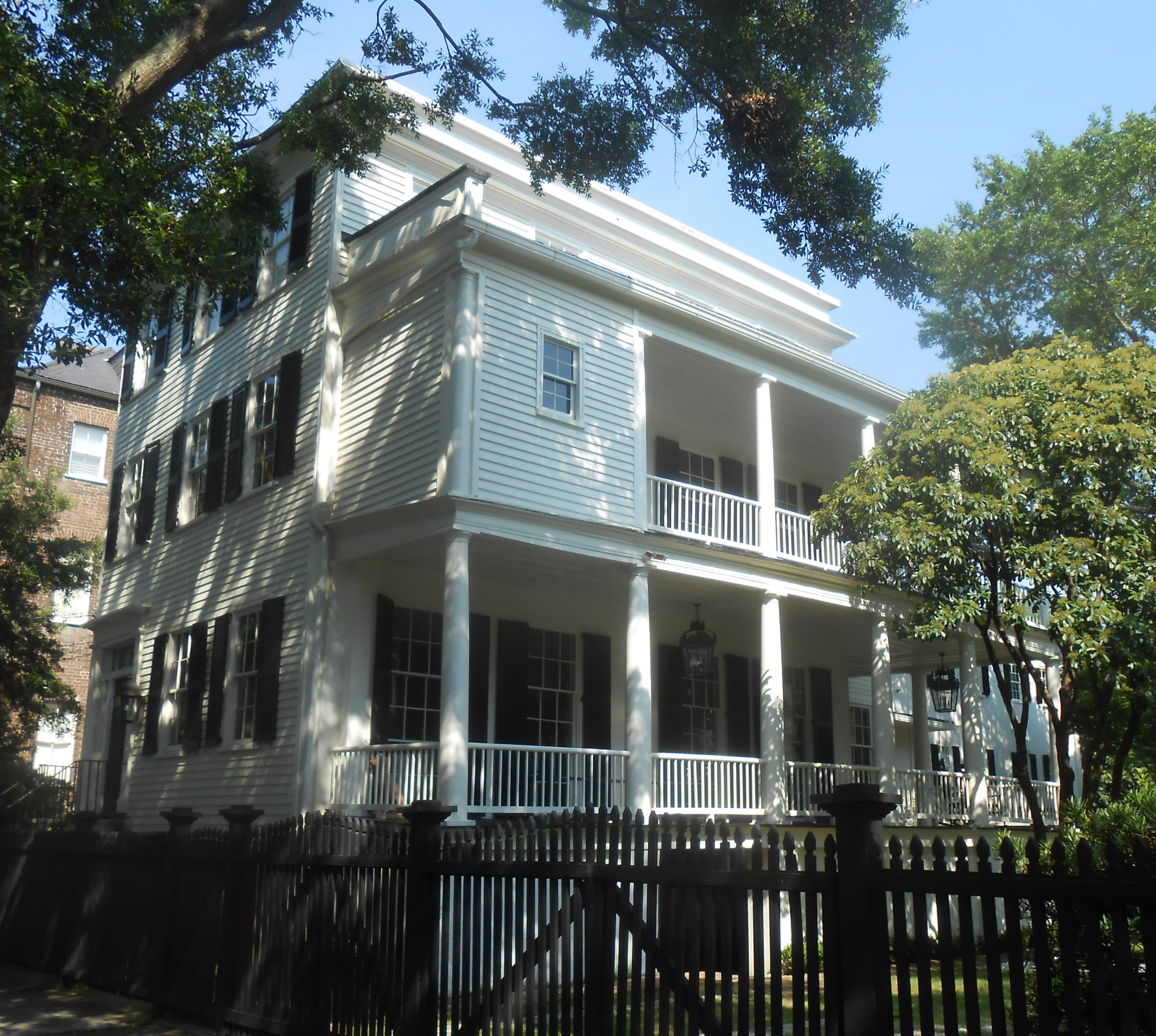
The Augustus Taft House's piazzas overlook a large parcel that has been part of the property since the house was built about 1836.

The Augustus Taft House is a Greek Revival house at 57 Laurens St., Charleston, South Carolina in the historic Ansonborough neighborhood.

The house was constructed by Augustus Taft about 1836 using black cypress. Its interior has three fireplaces done in black Italian marble and pine flooring. The house has large, three-part windows that permit access to the piazzas.

The house's interior retains the original room configuration. The front door in on the north facade and opens onto a stair hall. There are twin parlors to the right (the west side of the house) and a dining room. Behind the house is a three-story kitchen house. The house was two-story piazzas on the west side.

Augustus Taft, a member of the same New England family of President Taft, built the house in 1836, and it survived a fire in 1838 that devastated most of the Ansonborough neighborhood. Taft's daughter married Pierre Gaillard Stoney, and the house remained in the family more than one hundred years. In 1865, the house was used to house freed slaves by the Freedmen's Bureau for six months.

The house (both inside and out) is protected by a preservation easement given to the Historic Charleston Foundation.
