= Antoine Toussaint de Chazal =

Mauritian politician and painter (1770–1822)

- Born: 15 December 1770; Port Louis, Isle de France
- Died: 25 December 1822 (aged 52); Moka, Isle de France
- Occupations: Planter; Artist

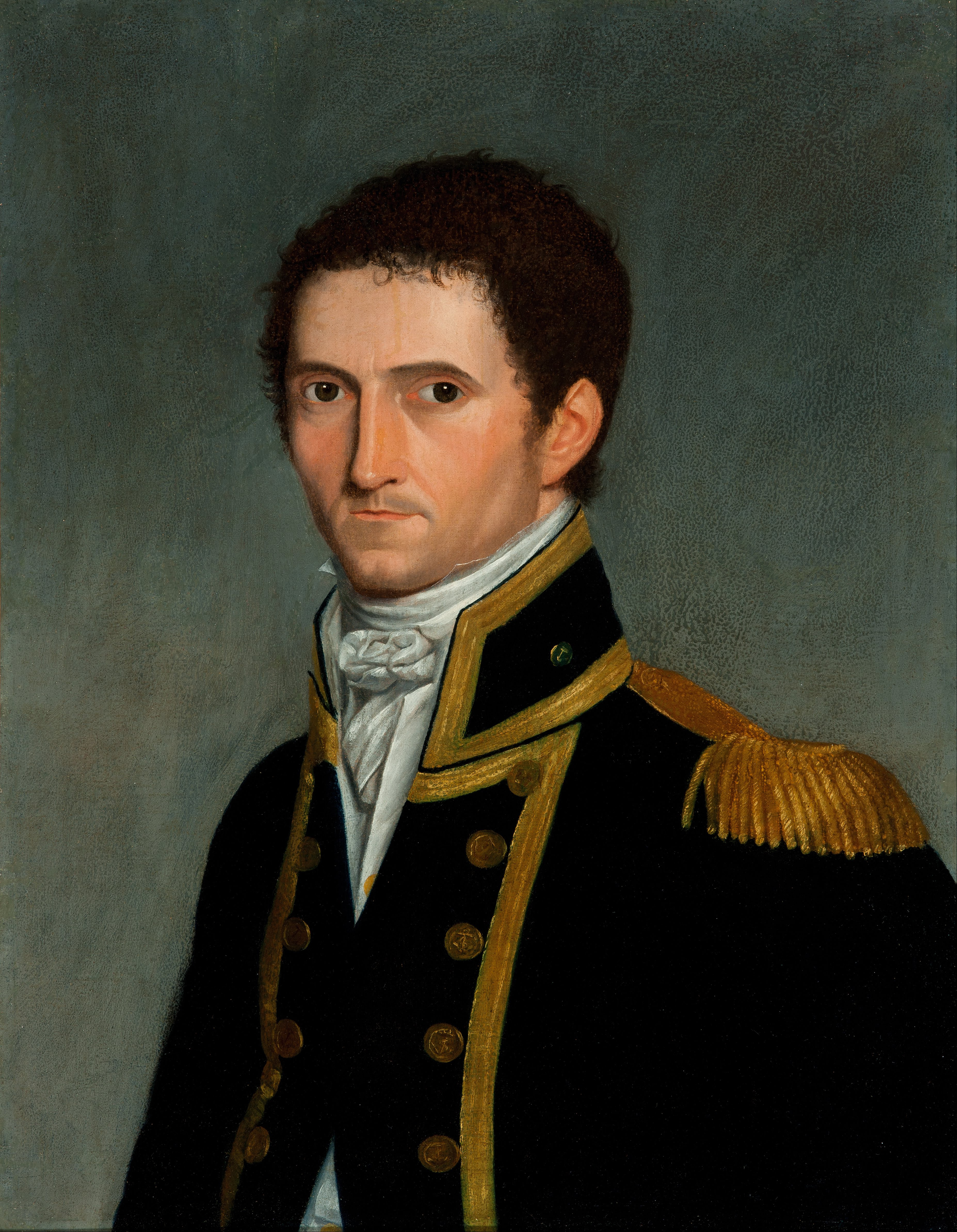
Portrait of Captain Matthew Flinders (circa 1806–1807), who circumnavigated and charted the coast of Australia

Antoine Toussaint de Chazal (1770–1854) was a French settler established as a planter on the Isle de France (now Mauritius).

De Chazal was born on 15 December 1770, in Port Louis, Isle de France.

He was deputy of the district of Pamplemousses, in the colonial Assembly of the Isle de France.

He was an amateur painter and is known for his portrait of the British cartographer and Royal Navy captain Matthew Flinders, painted in 1806–1807.

The fourth edition of the Benezit Dictionary of Artists confuses him with the painter Antoine Chazal (1793–1854).

He died in Moka, Isle de France, on 25 December 1822 and is an ancestor of Malcolm de Chazal.

== Work ==
- Portrait of Captain Matthew Flinders, oil on canvas, 50x64.5 cm. Gift of David Roche in memory of his father, J.D.K. Roche, and the South Australian Government 2000, to the Art Gallery of South Australia, Adelaide.
