= Gabriel Omer Descemet =

Gabriel Omer Descemet (December 1, 1879—1961) was a Senegalese colonial administrator. He served as acting lieutenant governor of Mauritania from 19 June 1931 to 22 June 1933 and lieutenant governor from 7 April 1934 to 5 July 1934. Born into a Metis family in Saint-Louis, Senegal, Descemet attended lycee in Paris and trained in what is now Mali. He climbed higher in the French administration than many Metis, serving for 25 years in Haut-Senegal-Niger. As governor of Mauritania, he initiated an investigation of the claims of Louis Hunkanrin, including those of murder and slavery.
