= Faber-Ward House =

House in Charleston, South Carolina

Coordinates: 32.77151°N 79.93972°W

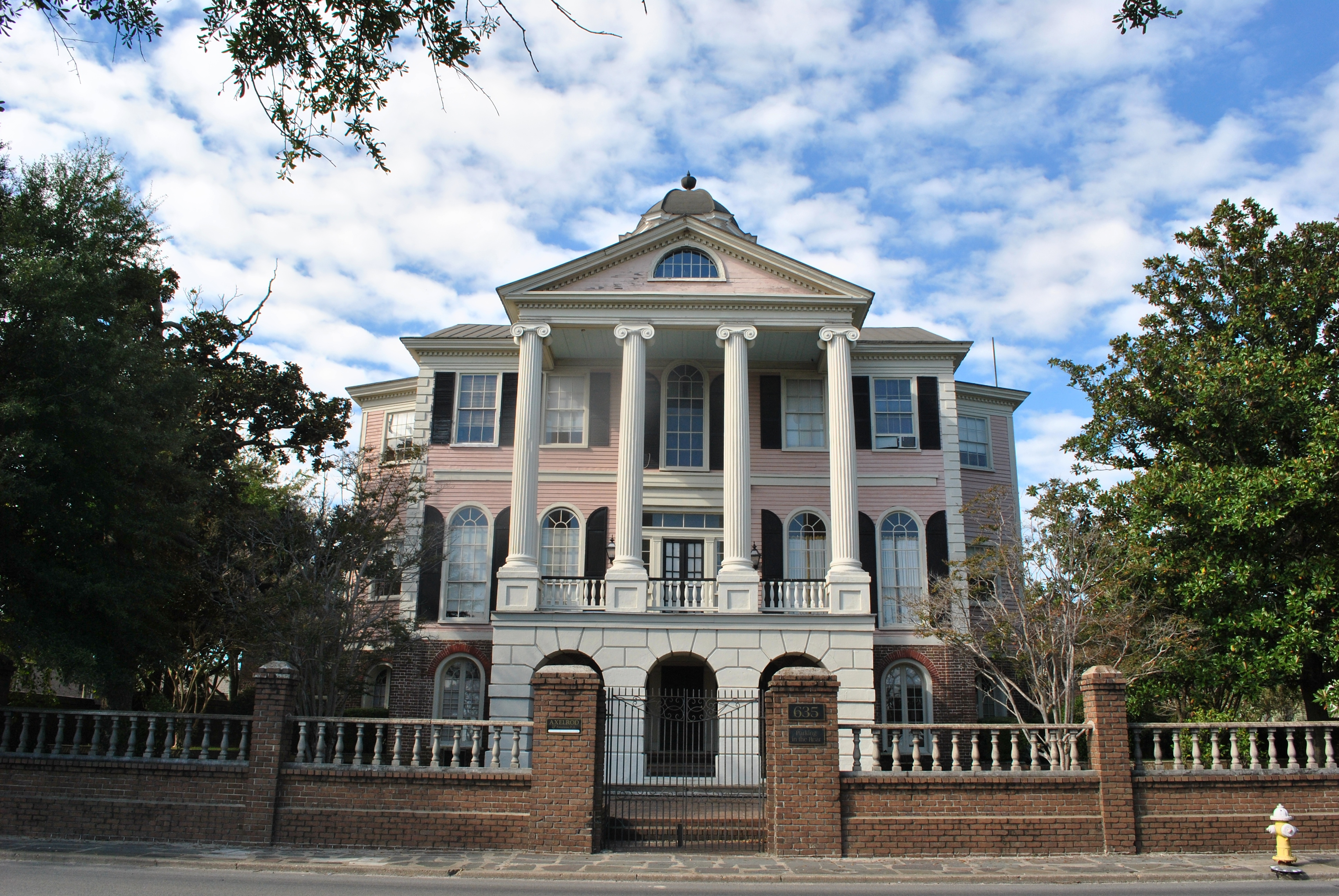
Faber-Ward House in 2013

The Faber-Ward House is a historic three-story home in Charleston, South Carolina. Henry F. Faber built the house about 1832 in a Palladian style reminiscent of Southern plantations. The house was converted into a hotel for African-Americans after the American Civil War and then a middle-class residence.

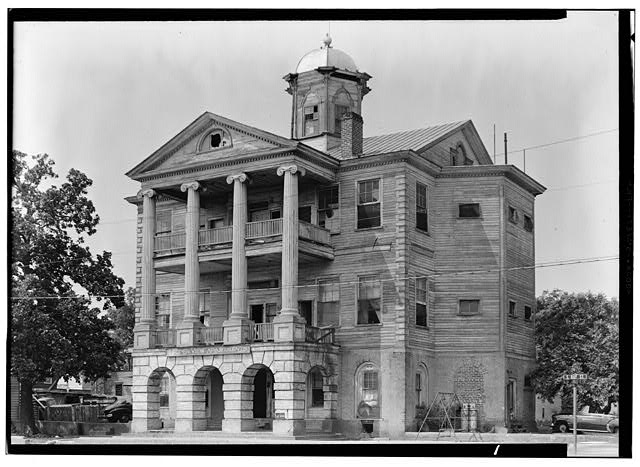
The house was photographed in 1958 before it was restored by the Historic Charleston Foundation.

In 1964, the Historic Charleston Foundation bought the house and undertook a restoration of the then-abandoned building.
