= Swiss Americans =

Americans of Swiss birth or descent

Schweizamerikaner (German) Suisses Américains/Helvético-Américains (French) Svizzero Americano (Italian) Svizer American (Romansh)
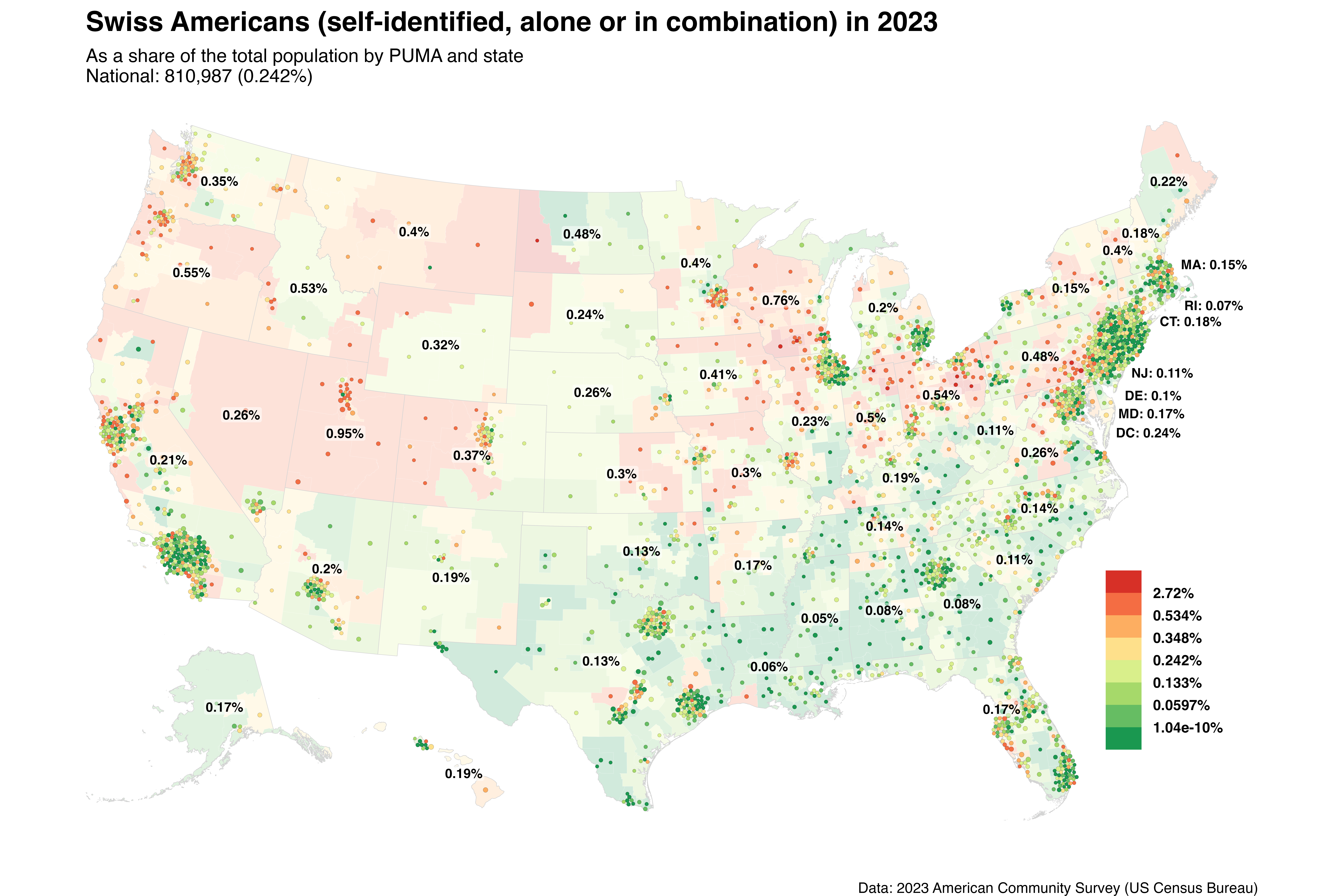

Total population
- 861,324 (2024)

Regions with significant populations
- New York, Pennsylvania, California, Michigan, Ohio, Illinois, Wisconsin, Colorado, Indiana, Missouri, Washington, Arizona, Utah, Texas, Oregon and Iowa

Languages
- English · German · French · Italian · Romansh

Religion
- mostly Christianity (Catholic and Reformed)

Related ethnic groups
- Swiss people, Swiss diaspora; European Americans, Pennsylvania Dutch

Swiss Americans are Americans of full or partial Swiss descent.

Swiss emigration to America predates the formation of the United States, notably in connection with the persecution of Anabaptism during the Swiss Reformation and the formation of the Amish community. In the 19th century, there was substantial immigration of Swiss farmers, who preferred rural settlements in the Midwest. Swiss immigration peaked in the 1880s and diminished after 1930, although limited immigration continues. Between 1700 and 2000, an estimated 460,000 Swiss immigrants entered the United States.

The number of Americans of Swiss descent is nearly one million. The Swiss Federal Department of Foreign Affairs reported the permanent residency of Swiss nationals in the United States as 80,218 in 2015. According to the U.S. Census Bureau, 26,896 individuals born in Switzerland declared that they were of Swiss ancestry in 2015, 3,047 individuals born in Switzerland declared that they were of German ancestry in 2015, 1,255 individuals born in Switzerland declared that they were of French ancestry in 2015, and 2,555 individuals born in Switzerland declared that they were of Italian ancestry in 2015.

== History ==
=== Origins ===
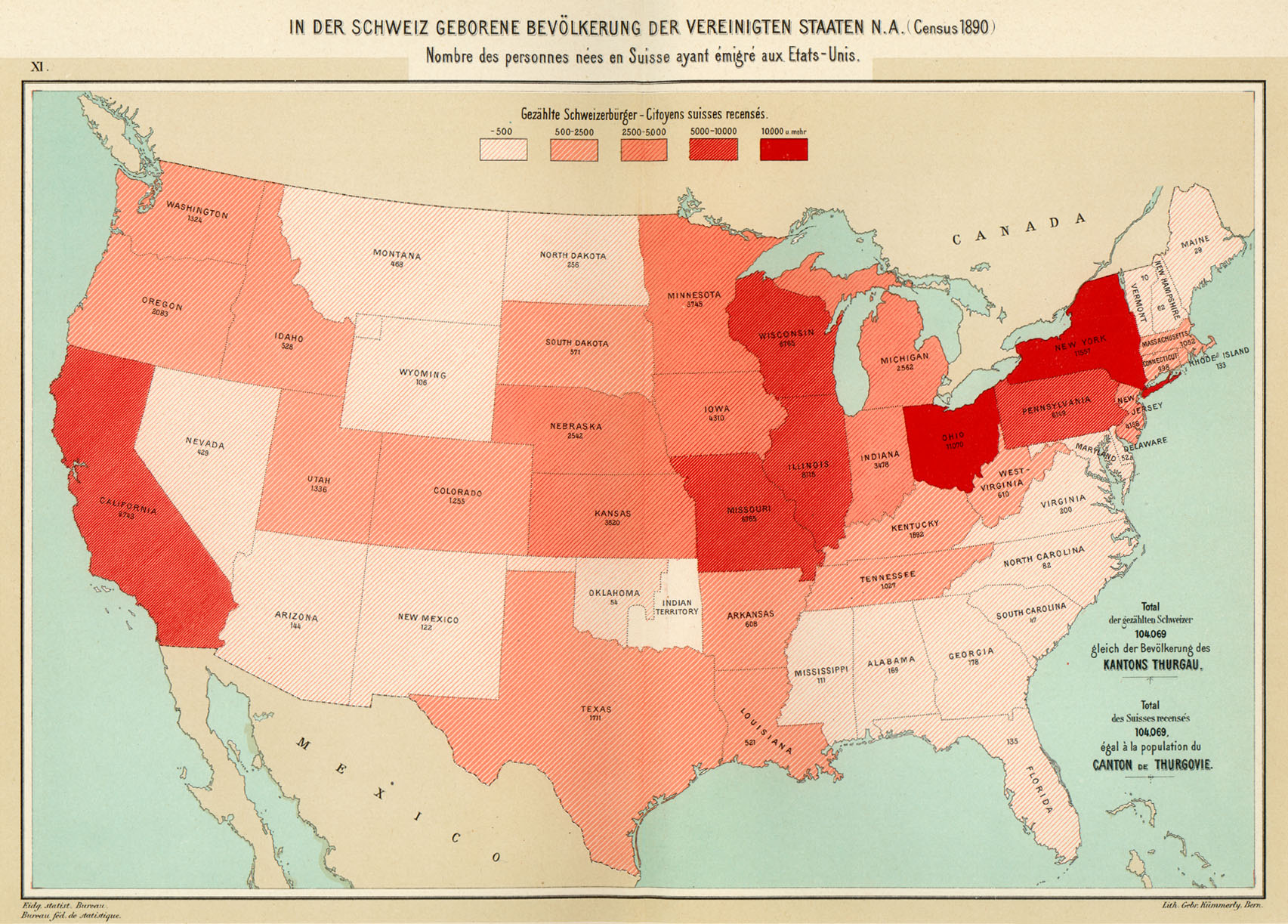
Swiss immigrants to the U.S. totaled 104,000 according to the 1890 census.

The first Swiss person in what is now the territory of the United States was Theobald von Erlach (1541–1565) of Bern, a member of René de Laudonnière's expedition who disappeared in Florida. Swiss artisans, whose exact origins are unknown, participated in the construction of Jamestown, Virginia in 1608. In the 17th and especially the 18th century, Swiss immigrants mostly consisted of members of religious communities from the cantons of Zurich and Bern, such as Anabaptists, Pietists and Mennonites, who settled in Georgia, Pennsylvania and the Carolinas. The Swiss in the British colonies, especially those from German-speaking regions, were often mistaken for Germans. Therefore, the figure of 25,000 Swiss immigrants in 1790, when the first American census was conducted, is significantly underestimated. Most Swiss settled in cities, such as Philadelphia, Germantown, Charleston, and Savannah, or in existing villages, while some founded colonies. New Bern and Pequea, both founded in 1710, and Purrysburg, founded in 1732, were among the first Swiss colonies in the Americas. Of the 25,000-30,000 estimated Swiss who had moved to the United States by 1820, most settled in Pennsylvania and the Carolinas.

=== 19th century ===
In the 19th century, poverty was one of the main reasons for emigration from Switzerland. After the famine of 1817-1818, many Swiss municipalities attempted to replace long-standing mercenary service with organized and subsidized civilian emigration. Swiss immigration to the United States, particularly from the Alpine valleys, increased significantly in the 1850s. Between 1851 and 1880, American authorities recorded the arrival of 76,653 Swiss in the country. They mostly settled in the Midwest, where they founded numerous colonies and settlements, such as Vevay, Tell City, Highland and New Glarus.

Between 1881 and 1893, over 100,000 Swiss citizens immigrated to the United States, amounting to nearly 8,000 arrivals per year. This large exodus can be attributed primarily to the population surplus in agricultural areas, which was linked to a drop in grain prices. The American economic crisis between 1894 and 1900 led to a decline in immigration. In 1900, the Swiss in the United States were a diverse group: around 38% of them were agricultural workers, one of the highest proportions among immigrant communities, while 35.5% lived in cities with over 25,000 inhabitants. Of Swiss immigrant involvement in the Civil War, David Vogelsanger writes, "More Swiss participated in the American Civil War than in any other foreign conflict except the Battle of Marignano in 1515 and Napoleon's Russian Campaign of 1812."

=== 20th and 21st centuries ===
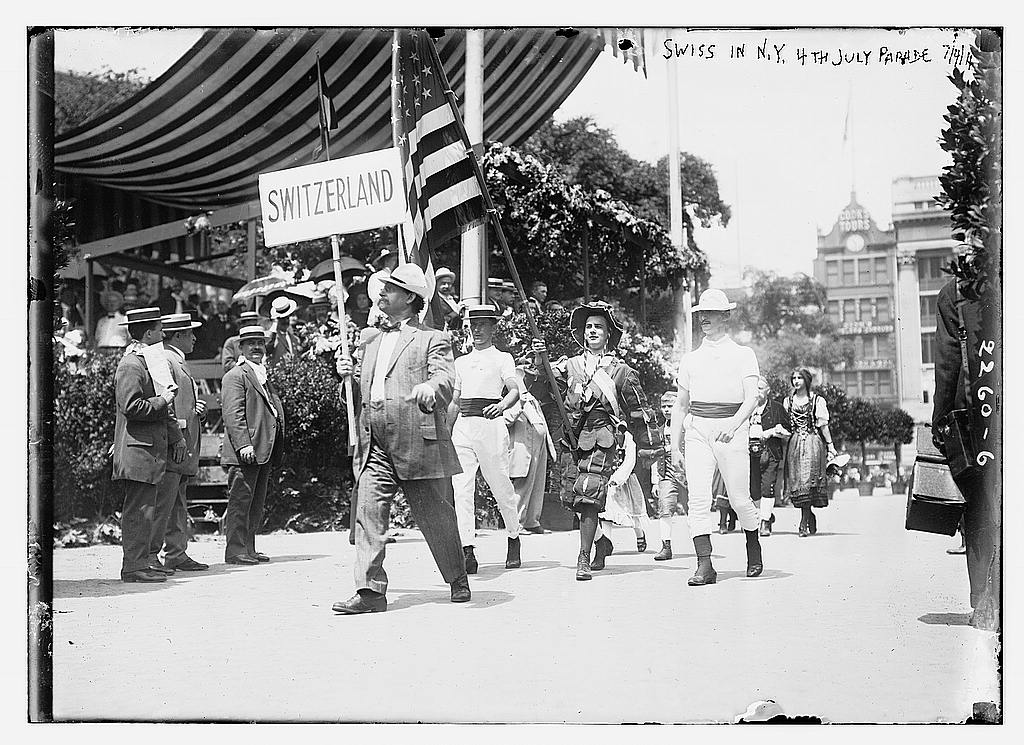
Swiss Americans at the 1911 Fourth of July parade in New York City

From the beginning of the 20th century, the proportion of Swiss immigrants working in the third sector increased. With the exception of the years of the First World War, immigration from Switzerland remained high until 1923, with over 4,000 Swiss arriving annually. It then entered into a period of decline, particularly during the Great Depression of the 1930s. Following the Second World War, the number of Swiss immigrants stabilized at an average of about 2,000 per year, although statistics have become less accurate. 23,700 more Swiss arrived from 1930 to 1960, followed by 29,100 more between 1961 and 1990, many of whom were professionals or employees in American branches of Swiss companies who later returned to Switzerland. An estimated 78.5% of immigrants returned to Switzerland between 1958 and 1974. In 2010, 75,252 Swiss citizens resided in the U.S., two-thirds of whom held dual citizenship.

=== Cantons of origin and U.S. destinations ===
Immigration to the United States affected all Swiss cantons, albeit to varying degrees and with different periods. The U.S. was the preferred overseas destination, particularly between 1870 and 1920, when it received 83% of all Swiss emigrants. The only exceptions during this period were the cantons of Fribourg, Valais and Geneva, from which fewer than 60% of emigrants went to the United States. Most Swiss immigrants to the U.S. came from the cantons of Bern, Ticino, and Zurich. In the early 19th century, the majority of Swiss, like Germans and Scandinavians, settled in the Mid-Atlantic and the Midwest. In 1870, the two regions were home to around 65% of Swiss immigrants (although only 33.7% of the total American population).

The Swiss later went primarily to the West Coast, where especially the Italian-speaking Swiss were taking part in California's winegrowing culture, or then took up residence in more industrial and urban areas such as New York City, Philadelphia, Pittsburgh, Chicago, St. Louis, Denver or San Francisco. In 1930, the West Coast population accounted for 24.4% of the Swiss and 6.7% of the country's overall population. In other regions, the differences between the proportions of the Swiss and overall American populations around 1930 were minimal, with the exception of the Southern United States, which had never been attractive to Swiss immigrants and was home to only 5.8% of them (compared to 30.9% of the American population). Although Swiss settlers also followed the general migration to the West, they were generally not among the pioneers of the American frontier.

== Population ==
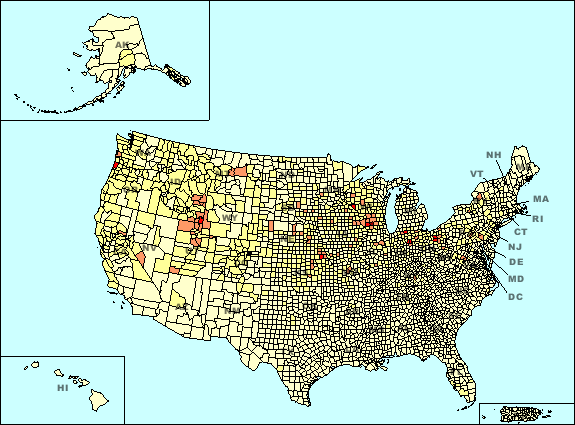
Distribution of Swiss Americans by county according to the 2000 Census

=== Swiss Americans by numbers ===
According to the 2000 United States Census, the 15 cities with the largest populations of Swiss Americans are as follows:

1. New York City – 8,108
2. Los Angeles, California – 6,169
3. San Diego, California – 4,349
4. Portland, Oregon – 4,102
5. Madison, Wisconsin – 3,898
6. Phoenix, Arizona – 3,460
7. Seattle, Washington – 3,446
8. San Francisco, California – 3,381
9. Chicago, Illinois – 3,008
10. San Jose, California – 2,661
11. Columbus, Ohio – 2,640
12. Monroe, Wisconsin – 2,582
13. Houston, Texas – 2,226
14. Dallas, Texas-1,865
15. Salt Lake City, Utah – 2,105
16. Indianapolis, Indiana – 1,939

According to the 2007 American Community Survey, the states with the largest populations of Swiss Americans are as follows:

1. California – 117,700
2. Ohio – 86,147
3. Pennsylvania – 73,912
4. Wisconsin – 61,134
5. Illinois – 42,194
6. Indiana – 41,540
7. New York – 40,113
8. Florida – 39,001
9. Texas – 37,258
10. Washington – 36,697
11. Oregon – 33,234
12. Utah – 30,606
13. Missouri – 25,809
14. Michigan – 25,533
15. Arizona – 24,485

=== Swiss Americans by percentage of total population ===
According to the 2000 United States Census the highest percentage of Swiss Americans in any town, village or other, are the following:

1. Berne, Indiana – 29.10%
2. Monticello, Wisconsin – 28.82%
3. New Glarus, Wisconsin – 28.26%
4. Boys Ranch, Texas – 23.30%
5. Monroe, Wisconsin – 18.91%
6. Pandora, Ohio – 18.90%
7. Argyle, Wisconsin – 17.84%
8. Sugarcreek, Ohio – 17.29%
9. Elgin, Iowa – 15.79%
10. Monroe, Indiana – 14.35%
11. Baltic, Ohio – 12.91%
12. Brickerville, Pennsylvania – 11.52%
13. Albany, Wisconsin – 11.51%
14. Belleville, Wisconsin – 11.25%
15. Blanchardville, Wisconsin – 11.21%
16. Shipshewana, Indiana – 10.89%

only cities, towns and villages with at least 500 people included

According to the 2000 United States Census the states with the highest percentage of people of Swiss ancestry are the following:

1. Utah – 1.28%
2. Wisconsin – 0.91%
3. Idaho – 0.87%
4. Oregon – 0.76%
5. Indiana – 0.64%

=== Communities settled by Swiss immigrants ===
- Beaumont, California
- Bern, Idaho
- Bern, Kansas
- Berne, Indiana
- Bernville, Pennsylvania
- Big Bear Lake, California
- Bluffton, Ohio
- Central City, Colorado
- Denver, Colorado
- Grayson County, Virginia
- Gruetli-Laager, Tennessee
- Helvetia, West Virginia
- Highland, Illinois
- Hohenwald, Tennessee
- Holmes County, Ohio
- Holtville, California
- Lucerne Valley, California
- Midway, Utah
- Monroe, Wisconsin
- Mt. Angel, Oregon
- Naperville, Illinois
- Neuchatel, Kansas
- New Bern, North Carolina
- New Glarus, Wisconsin
- Newbern, Virginia
- Palmdale, California
- Payson, Utah
- Pittsburgh, Pennsylvania
- Purrysburg, South Carolina
- Sacramento, California
- Santa Clara, Utah
- Steinauer, Nebraska
- Sugarcreek, Ohio
- Tell City, Indiana
- Vernon, Texas
- Vevay, Indiana
- Zurich, Montana

== Swiss American historical societies ==
- Beech Island Historical Society, a historical society in South Carolina dedicated to the preservation of Historic Beech Island, including the early Swiss settlement led by John Tobler.
- Grundy County Swiss Historical Society, a historical society in Grundy County, Tennessee, site of former Swiss colony of Gruetli.
- Highland Historical Society, a historical society centered in Highland, Illinois, site of one of the oldest Swiss settlements in the United States. It was founded in 1831 by Swiss pioneers from Sursee, Switzerland.
- Orangeburgh German-Swiss Genealogical Society, a genealogical society focused on the early Swiss and German settlers of Orangeburg, South Carolina.
- Santa Clara Utah Historical Society, a historical Society dedicated to the preservation of an early Swiss Settlement in Utah.
- Swiss American Historical Society – focuses on the involvement of the Swiss and their descendants in American life, aspects of Swiss American relations, and Swiss history.
- Swiss Heritage Village & Museum – begun in 1985, it is currently the largest outdoor museum in northern Indiana. It is located in Berne, Indiana.
- Swiss Mennonite Cultural and Historical Association – consists of descendants of the Mennonites who immigrated to the U.S. from Ukraine in the 1870s. It has EIN 23-7332783 as a 501(c)(3) Public Charity.
- The Swiss Center of North America includes an extensive list of Swiss clubs. It has EIN 39-1982514 because of status as a 501(c)(3) Public Charity; in 2024 it claimed total revenue of $122,276 and total assets of $122,276.
- The Descendants of Swiss Settlers, founded in 2019, honors the legacy and achievements of Swiss men and women who settled in North America prior to March 5, 1798, which marks the end of the Old Swiss Confederacy. It has EIN 88-2853635 as a 501(c)(3) Public Charity.

== See also ==
- Switzerland–United States relations
- Swiss Amish
- Swiss diaspora
  - Swiss Argentines
  - Swiss Brazilians
  - Swiss Canadians
  - Swiss Chileans
  - Swiss Mexicans
- European Americans
