= Charles Camille Chazal =

French painter (1825-1875)

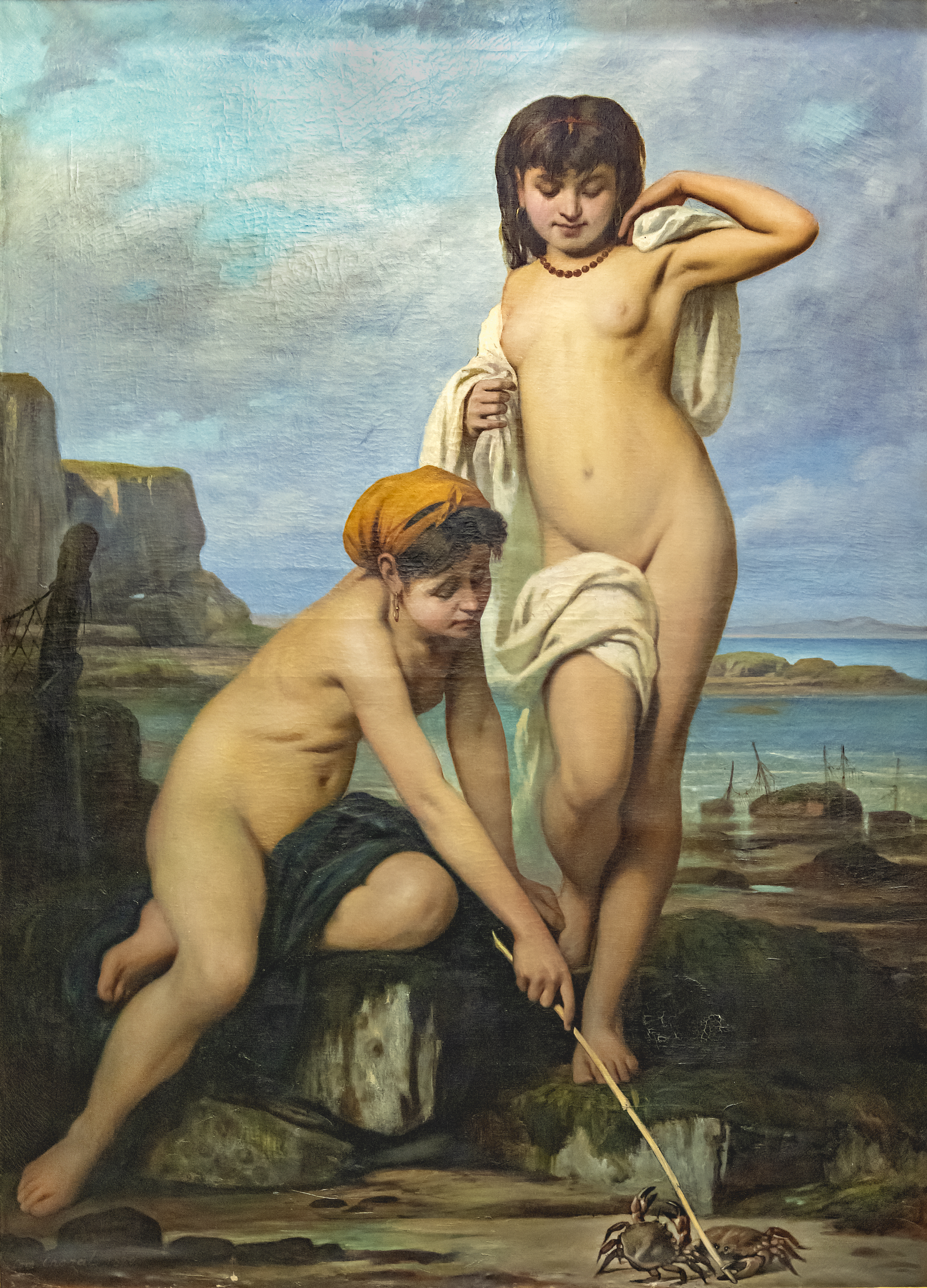
Jeunes filles au bords de la mer 1870 Musée des Beaux-Arts de Carcassonne

Charles Camille Chazal, a French painter, and son of Antoine Chazal, was born in Paris in 1825. He studied under Drolling and Picot, and entered the École des Beaux-Arts in 1842. His 'Institution of the Eucharist,' painted in 1863, is in the church of St. Louis-en-l'Ile at Paris. He died in 1875.
