= Ansonborough =

Neighbourhood in Charleston, South Carolina, United States

Coordinates: 32.787°N 79.9300°W

Ansonborough is a neighborhood in Charleston, South Carolina. In 1726, Captain George Anson acquired a 64-acre tract from Thomas Gadsden. Anson's lands were divided into smaller parcels for development, and several streets were named either for his ships or for himself: George and Anson (from his own name), Scarborough and Squirrel (named for the ships he came to America on), and Centurion (the ship he made his fortune with). Scarborough and Centurion Streets correspond to modern Anson and Society Street, while Squirrel is now a part of Meeting Street. On April 24, 1838, the area was devastated by a fire that swept from the southwest to the northeast through the area. When rebuilding began, the state offered loans on the condition that brick was used. By the 1950s, the area had suffered from a serious decline, and the Historic Charleston Foundation developed a program to save the historic area using a revolving fund.

== Gallery ==
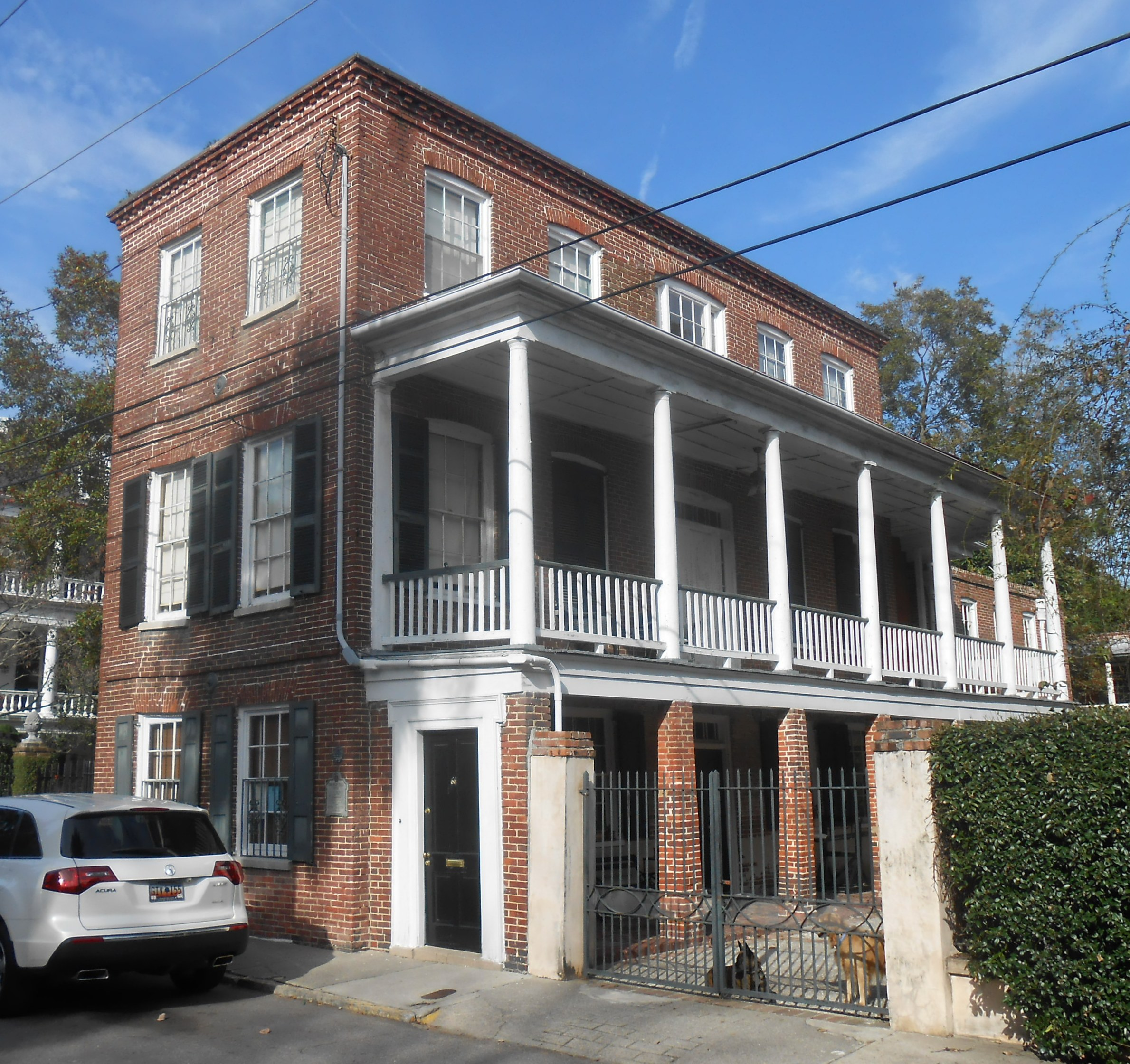
The Chazal House, 66 Anson Street

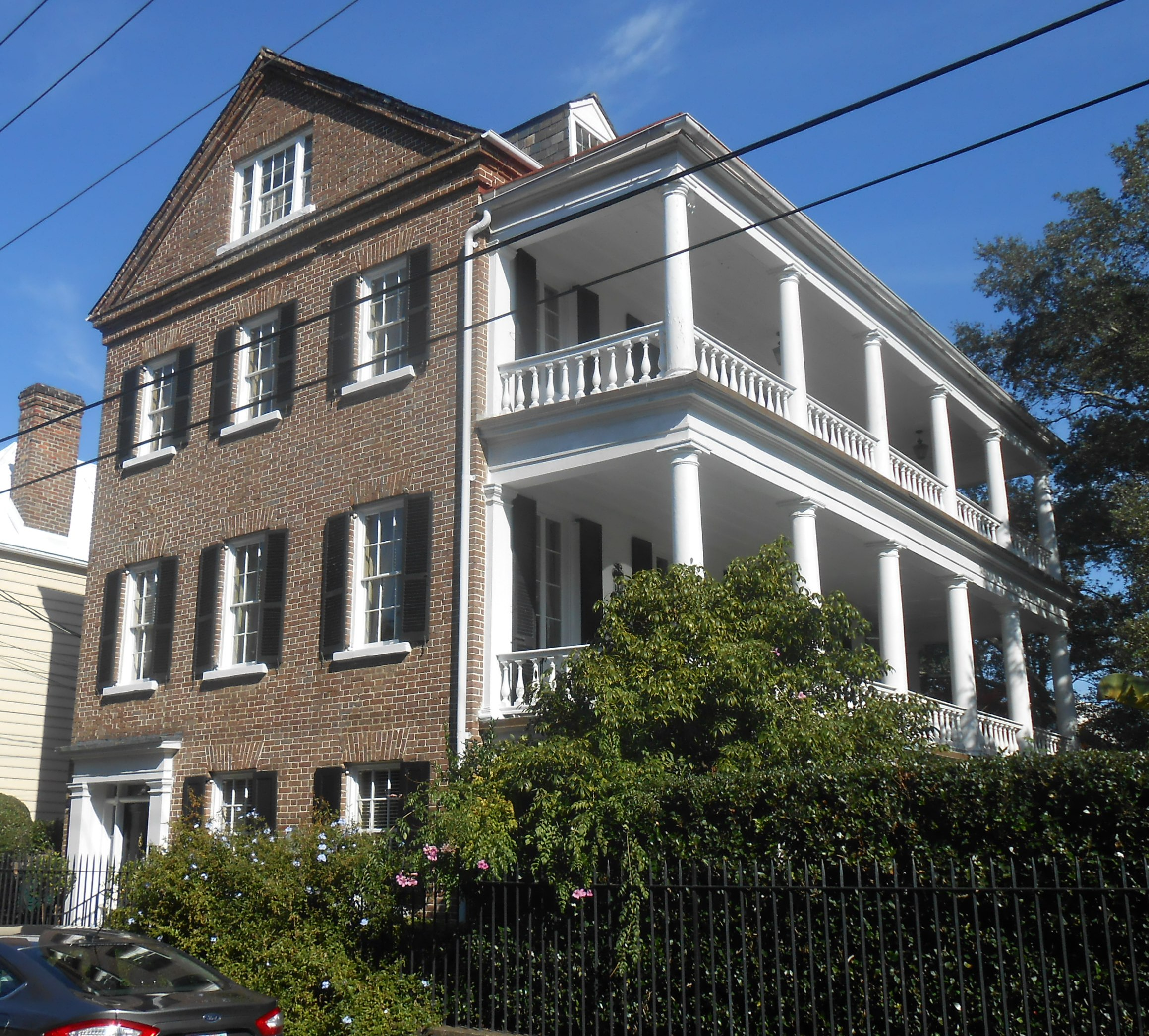
Benjamin Simons Neufville House, 72 Anson Street

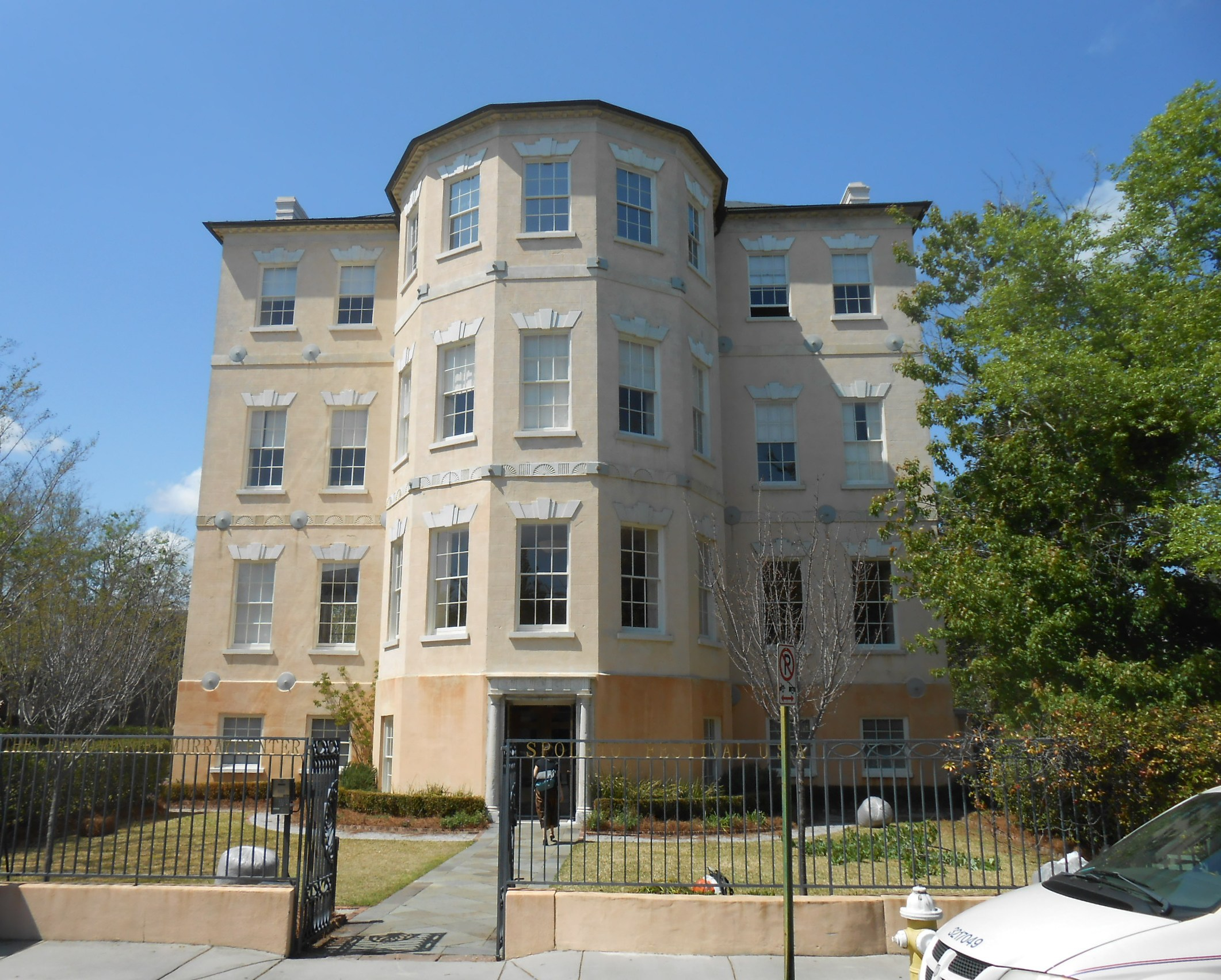
Middleton-Pinckney House, 14 George Street

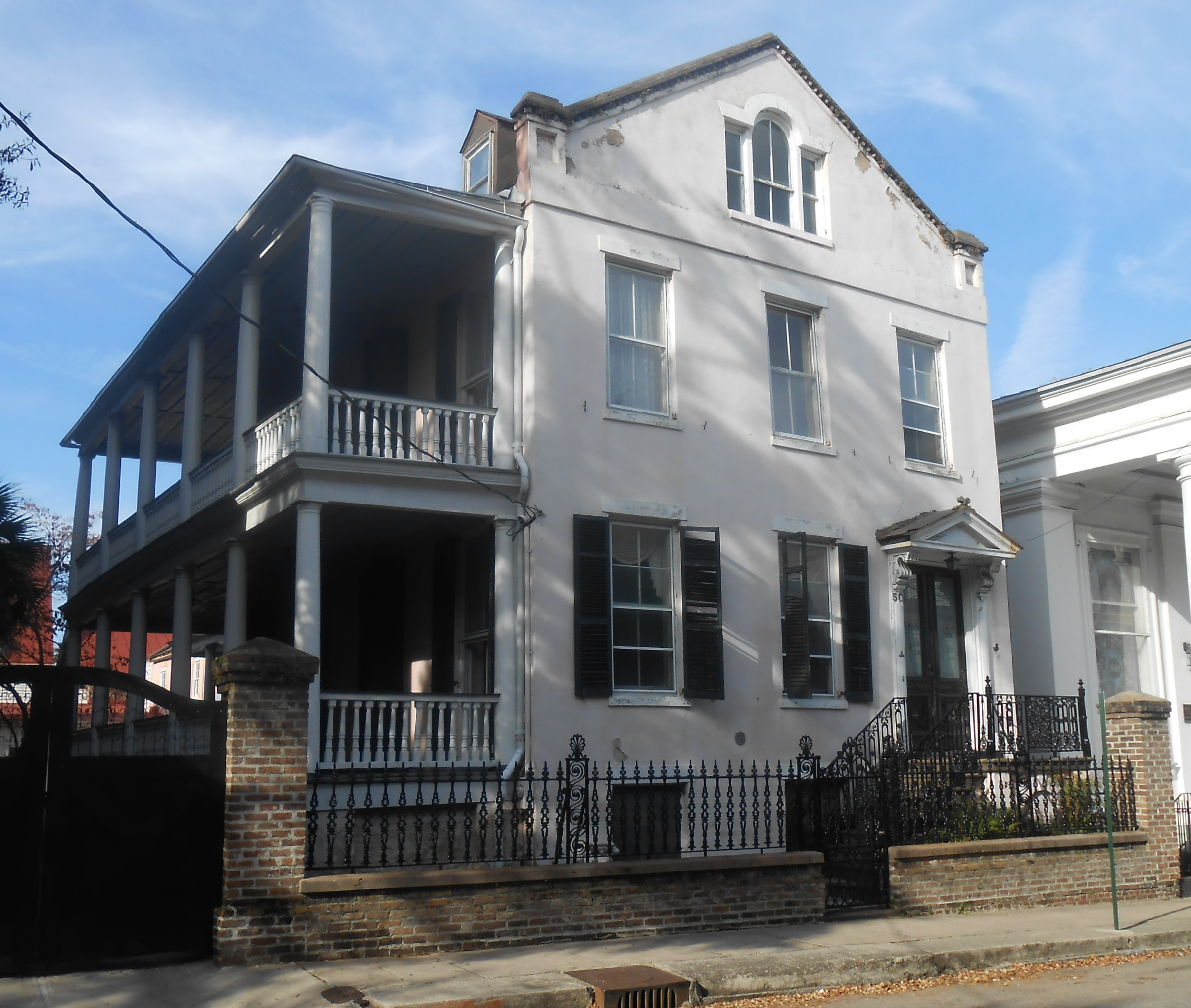
St. Johannes Rectory, 50 Hasell Street

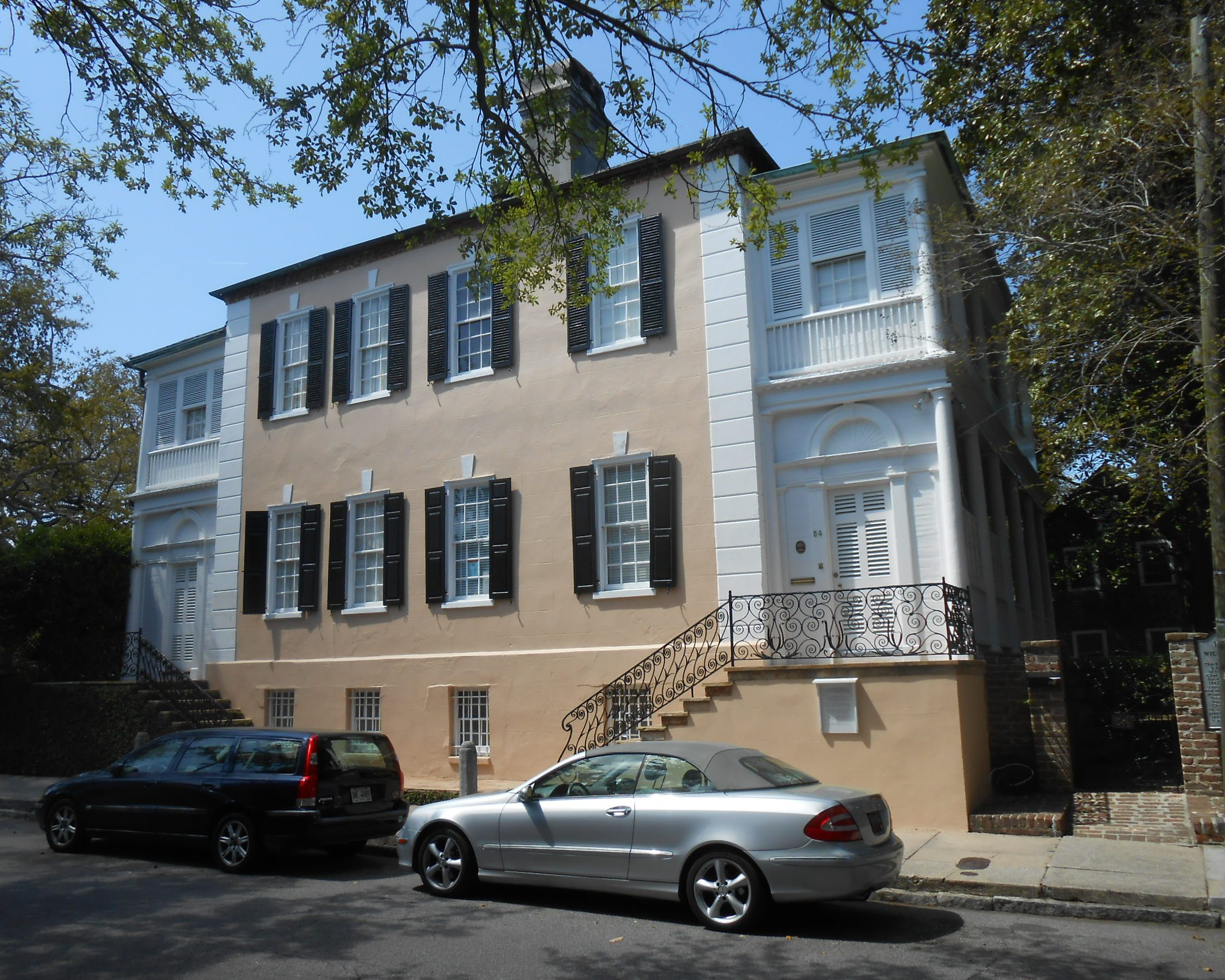
Col. William Rhett House, 54 Hasell Street

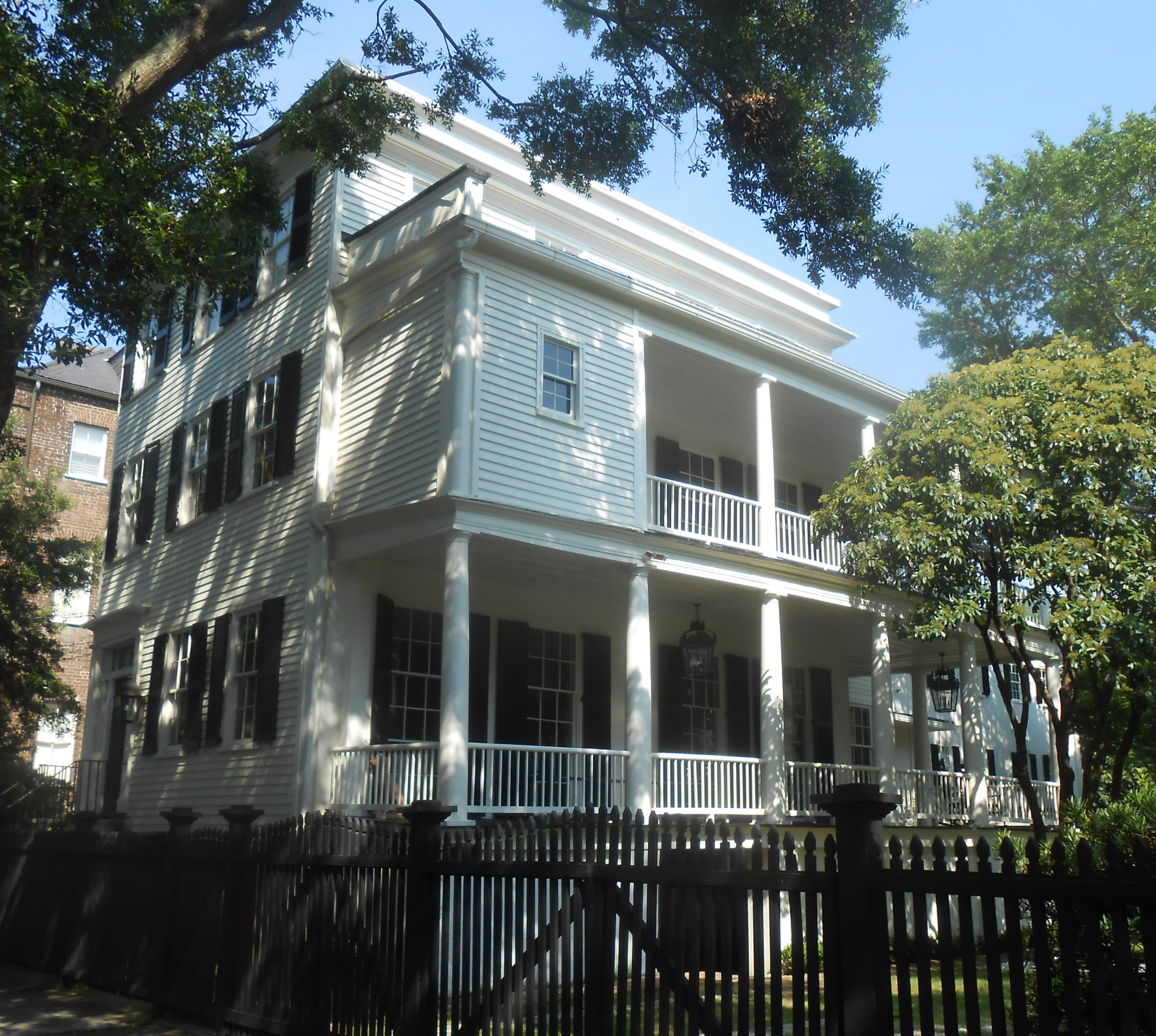
Augustus Taft House, 57 Laurens Street

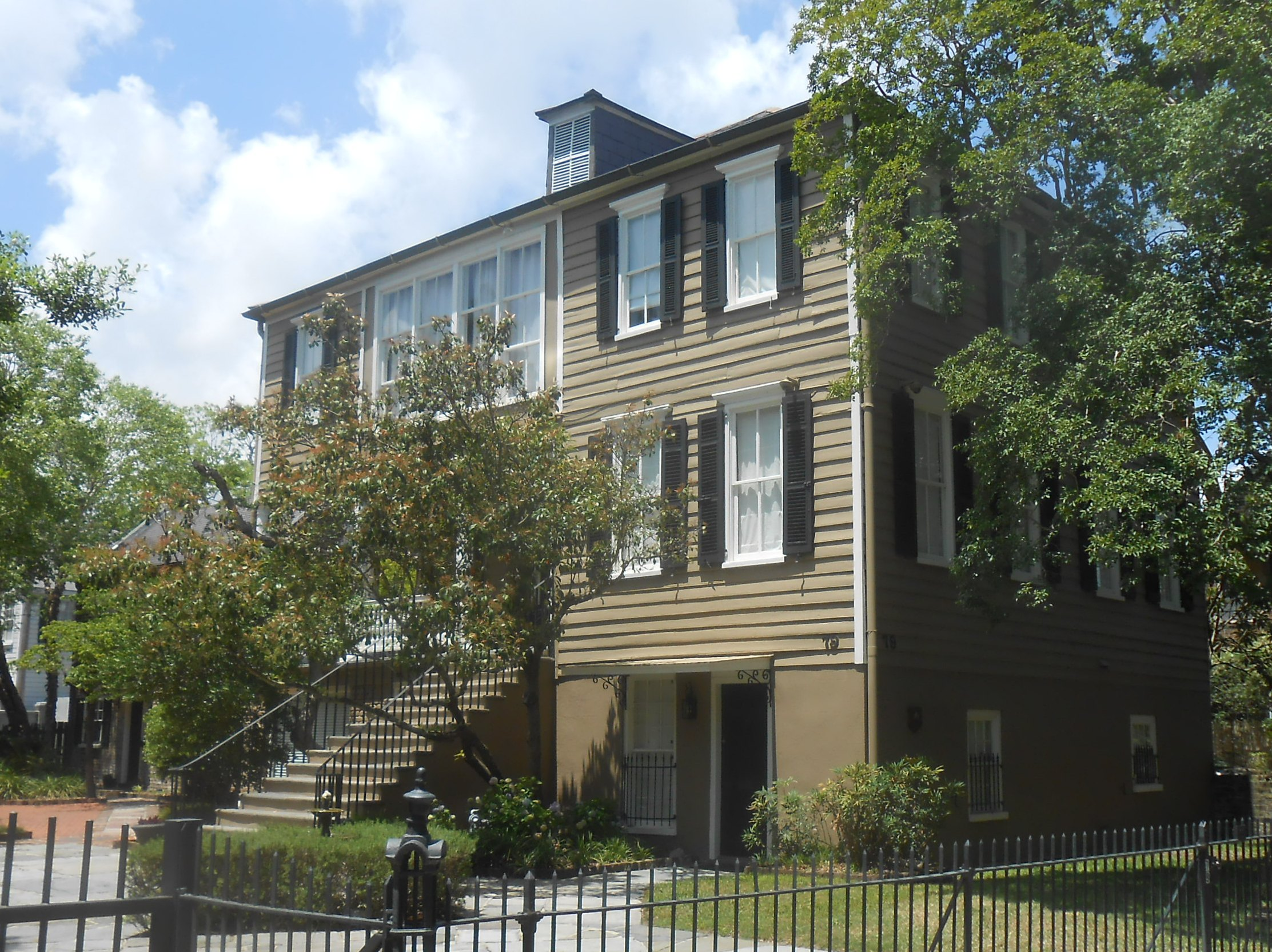
Daniel Legare House, 79 Anson Street
