= List of historical societies in South Carolina =

Historical societies in South Carolina

The following is a list of historical societies in the state of South Carolina, United States.

== Organizations ==
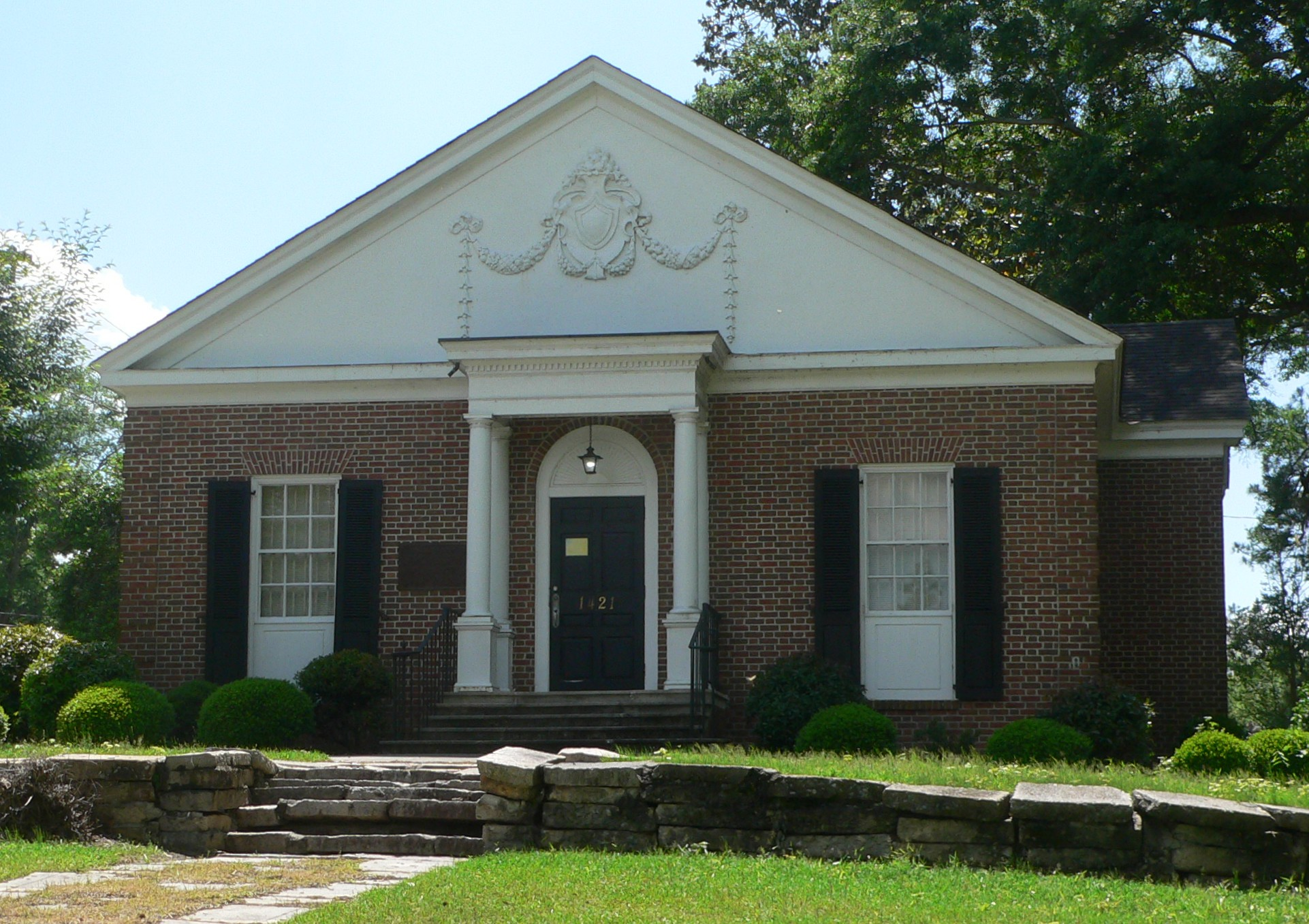
Archive building of the Orangeburg County Historical Society in Orangeburg, South Carolina (photo 2015)

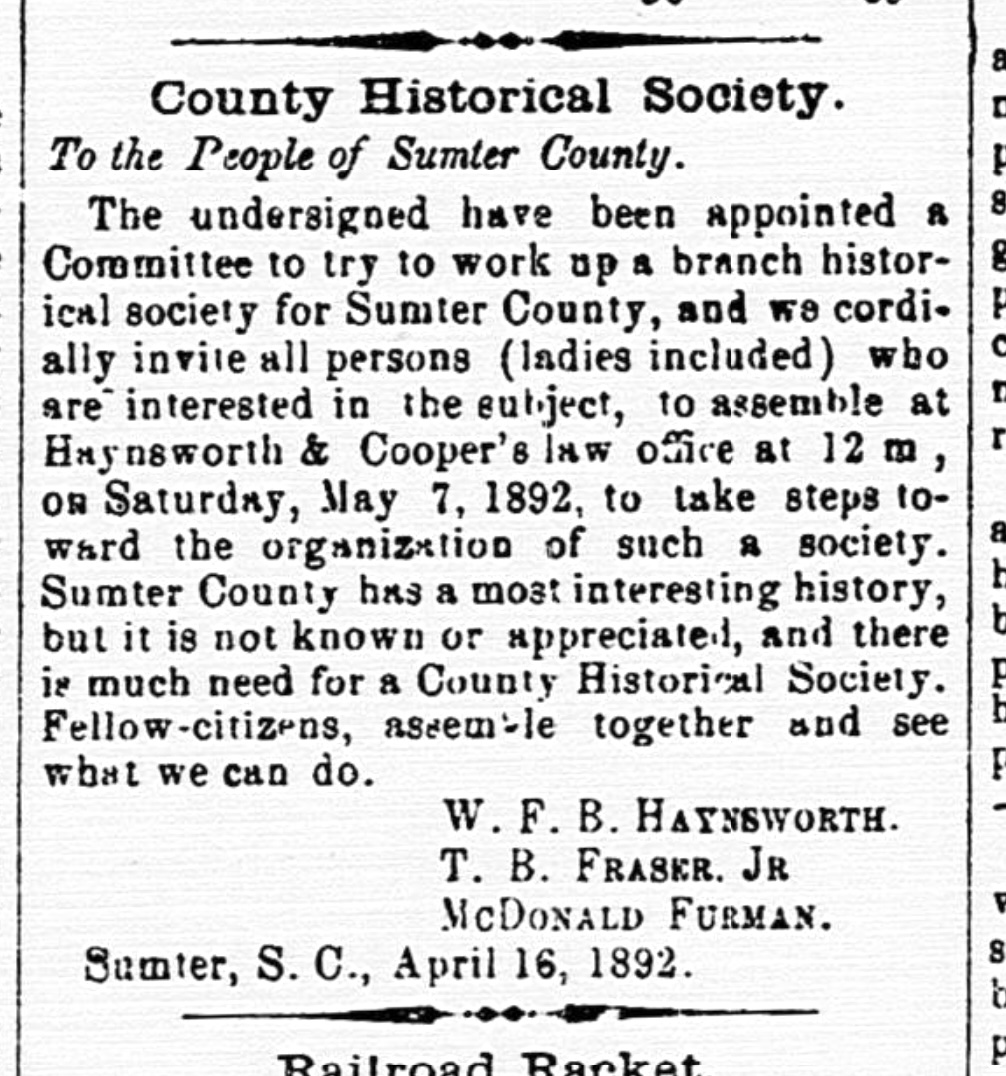
1892 newspaper item about forming a "county historical society" in Sumter County, South Carolina

- Abbeville County Historical Society
- Afro-American Historical Society (in Orangeburg)
- Aiken County Historical Society
- Allendale County Historical Society
- Historical Society of Bamberg
- Beaufort County Historical Society
- Beech Island Historical Society
- Berkeley County Historical Society
- Blackville Area Historical Society
- Blythewood Historical Society
- Historic Charleston Foundation
- Preservation Society of Charleston
- Chester County Historical Society
- Historical Society of Chesterfield County
- Clarendon County Historical Society
- Colleton County Historical and Preservation Society
- Historic Columbia
- Daniel Island Historical Society
- Darlington County Historical Society
- Dillon County Historical Society
- Dorchester County Historical Society
- Dutch Fork Historical Society
- Edgefield County Historical Society
- Fairfield County Historical Society
- Florence County Historical Society
- Fork Shoals Historical Society
- Georgetown County Historical Society
- Gray Court-Owings Historical Society
- Greenville County Historical Society
- Greenwood County Historical Society
- Hampton County Historical Society
- Horry County Historical Society
- Horse Creek Historical Society
- Jasper County Historical Society
- Kershaw County Historical Society
- Town of Kershaw Historical Society
- Lancaster County Historical Society
- Lee County Historical Society
- Lexington County Historical Society
- Lincolnville Preservation and Historical Society
- Loris Historical Society
- Lynches Lake Historical Society
- Marlborough Historical Society (in Bennettsville)
- Newberry County Historical and Museum Society
- Ninety Six Historical Society
- Orangeburg County Historical Society
- Parris Island Historical and Museum Society
- Pickens County Historical Society
- Piedmont Historical Society
- Reidville Historical Society
- Saluda County Historical Society
- Simpsonville Historical Society
- South Carolina Historical Society
- South Carolina Historical Association
- Spartanburg County Historical Association
- Sumter County Historical Society
- Surfside Beach Historical Society
- Travelers Rest Historical Society
- Union County Historical Society
- Williamsburgh Historical Society (in Kingstree)
- York County Genealogical and Historical Society
- Yorkville Historical Society

== See also ==
- History of South Carolina
- List of museums in South Carolina
- National Register of Historic Places listings in South Carolina
- List of historical societies in the United States
