= St. Johannes Rectory =

Coordinates: 32°46′59.7″N 79°55′48.5″W

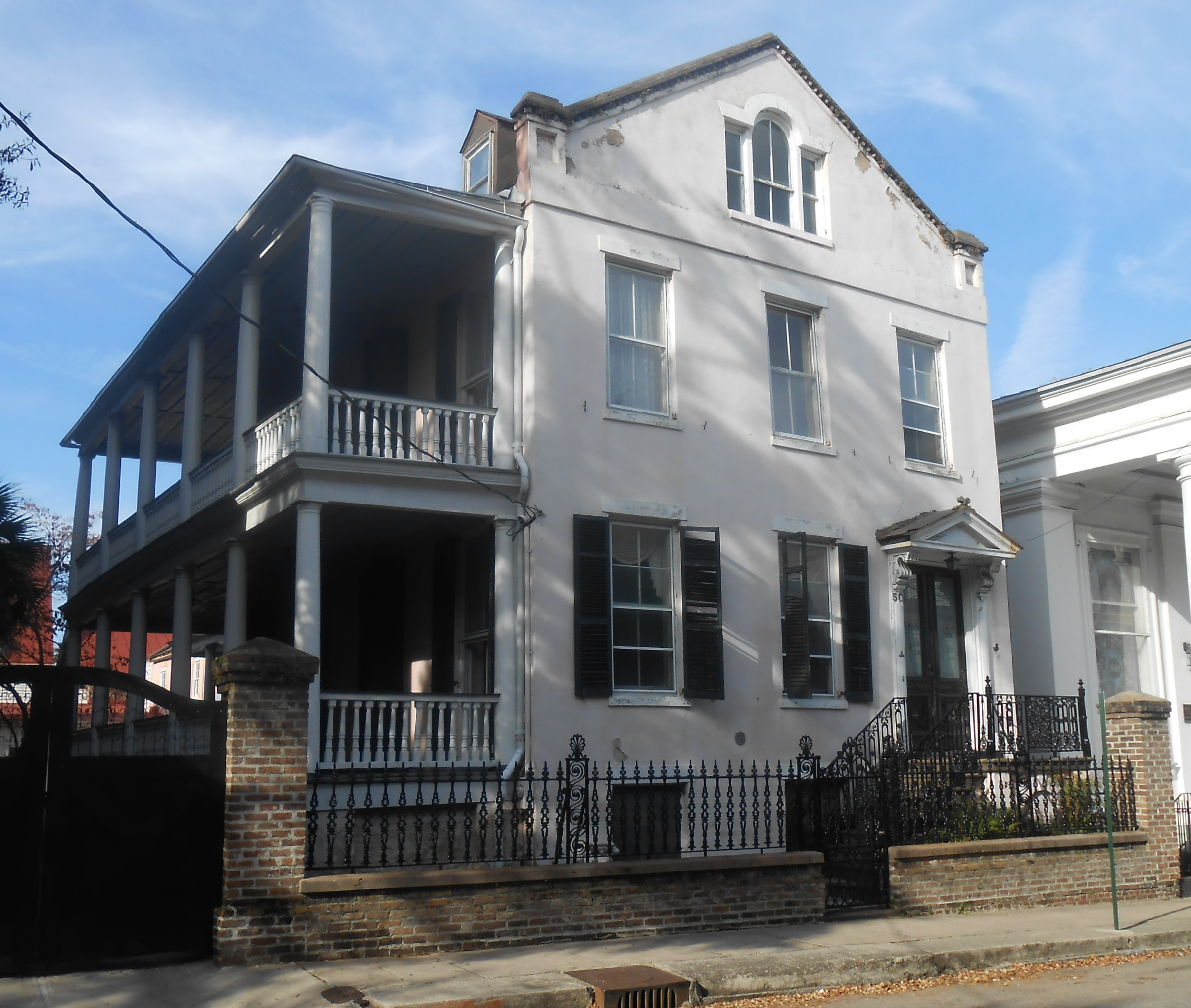
The Rectory of St. Johannes Lutheran Church at 50 Hasell Street, Charleston, South Carolina

The St. Johannes Rectory is a historic two-story home in the Ansonborough neighborhood of Charleston, South Carolina. The house was built about 1846 by Joel Smith, a planter from Abbeville, South Carolina. The house follows a side-hall plan with two large rooms on the first floor, both of which open onto the piazzas on the west, and a main staircase and hallway along the east side.

Mrs. Lydia Bryan owned a house at 50 Hasell Street, but it was destroyed in the Ansonborough fire of 1838. She conveyed the lot to her son, John Bryan, in 1841. After other owners, the empty lot was sold to Smith in 1846. He built the house. On January 26, 1920, the house was bought by St. Johannes Lutheran Church for use as its rectory.
