= Benjamin Simons Neufville House =

Coordinates: 32.7851°N 79.9308°W

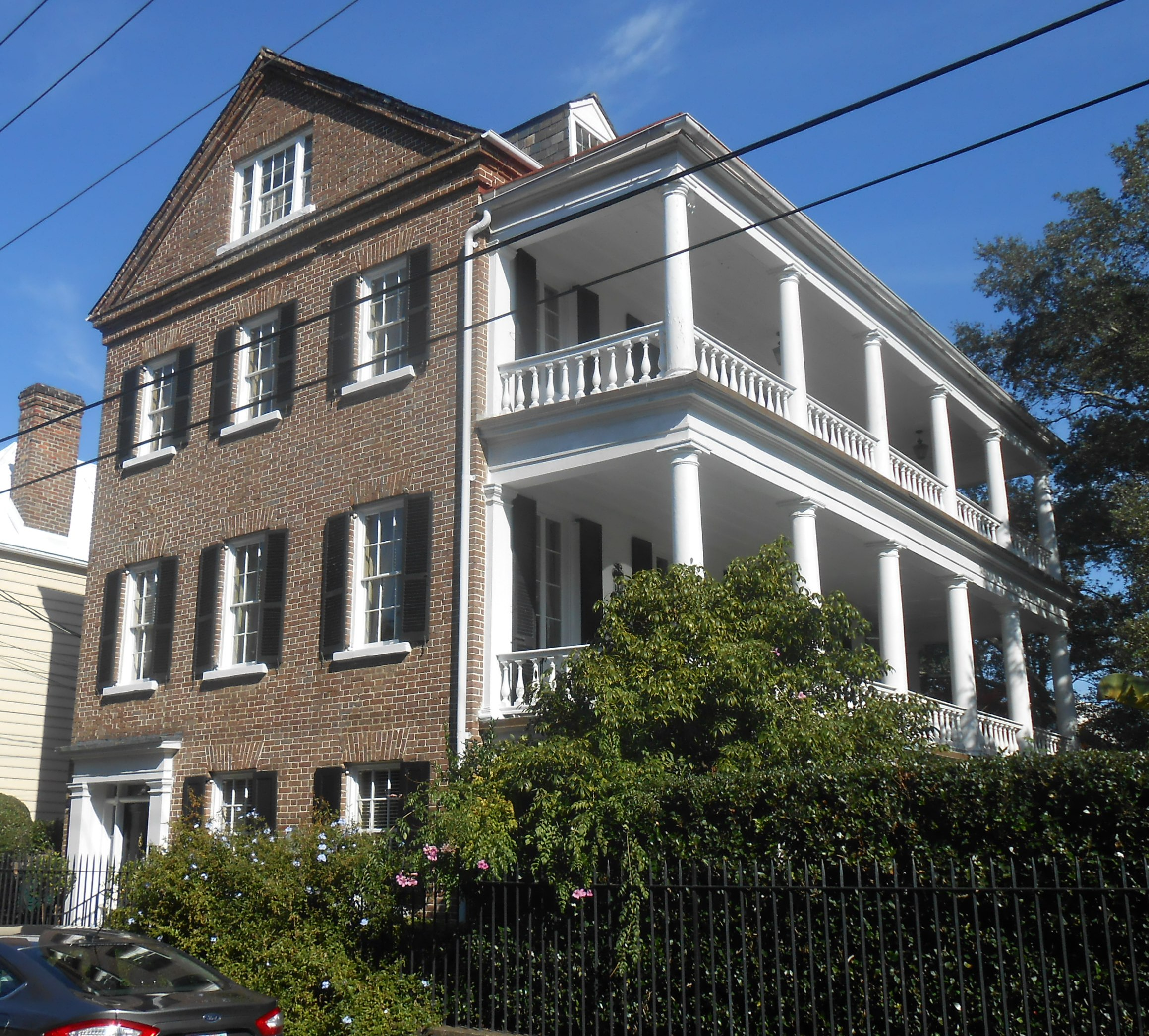
72 Anson St. was built after the Great Fire of 1838.

The Benjamin Simons Neufville House is a Greek Rival house at 72 Anson St., Charleston, South Carolina. It is one of the largest houses in the Ansonborough neighborhood. The house was built by Eliza Neufville Kohne in 1846 and remained in the family until 1904. The house was purchased by the Historic Charleston Foundation in 1959, which added a brick and wrought iron fence and tore down a later addition to the home, before selling it in 1962. While much of the interior was original, a fire in the 1950s resulted in much of the first floor of the home requiring extensive repairs.
