= List of colonial governors of Mauritania =

This is a list of colonial governors of Mauritania. The country of Mauritania had been a colony of France from 1903 to 1960.

== List of former colonial heads of Mauritania ==
(Dates in italics indicate de facto continuation of office)

Tenure	Incumbent	Notes
French protectorate of Mauritania
12 May 1903 to 18 October 1904	Xavier Coppolani, Commandant	
French civil territory of Mauritania	Incorporated into French West Africa	
18 October 1904 November 1904	Xavier Coppolani, Commandant	
November 1904 to 12 May 1905	Xavier Coppolani, Commissioner	He was killed in Tidjikja.
12 May 1905 to 27 May 1905	Louis Frèrejean, acting Commissioner	
27 May 1905 to November 1907	Bernard Laurent Montané-Capdebosq, Commissioner	
November 1907 to 1909	Henri Joseph Eugène Gouraud, Commissioner	
1909 to 1909	Claudel, acting Commissioner	
1909 to 1909	Aubert, acting Commissioner	
1 January 1910 to 1 March 1912	Henri Hippolyte Patey, Commissioner	
1 March 1912 to April 1914	Charles Paul Isidore Mouret, Commissioner	
April 1914 to 17 November 1916	Louis Jules Albert Obissier, Commissioner	
17 November 1916 to 11 December 1920	Nicolas Jules Henri Gaden, Commissioner	
11 December 1920 to 9 November 1926	Nicolas Jules Henri Gaden, Lieutenant Governor	
9 November 1926 to 13 January 1928	Albéric Auguste Fournier, Lieutenant Governor	
13 January 1928 to 21 November 1929	Alphonse Paul Albert Choteau, Lieutenant Governor	
21 November 1929 to 19 June 1931	René Héctor Émile Chazal, Lieutenant Governor	
19 June 1931 to 22 June 1933	Gabriel Omer Descemet, acting Lieutenant Governor	1st Term
22 June 1933 to 7 April 1934	Louis François Antonin, acting Lieutenant Governor	
7 April 1934 to 5 July 1934	Gabriel Omer Descemet, Lieutenant Governor	2nd Term
5 July 1934 to August 1934	Adolphe Deitte, Lieutenant Governor	
August 1934 to 1 November 1934	Jean-Baptiste Victor Chazelas, acting Lieutenant Governor	1st Term
1 November 1934 to 15 April 1935	Richard Edmond Maurice Édouard Brunot, Lieutenant Governor	
15 April 1935 to 10 November 1935	Jean-Baptiste Victor Chazelas, acting Lieutenant Governor	2nd Term
10 November 1935 to 1 September 1936	Jules Marcel de Coppet, Lieutenant Governor	
1 September 1936 to 24 October 1936	Jean Louis Beyries, acting Lieutenant Governor	1st Term
24 October 1936 to 7 August 1938	Oswald Durand, Lieutenant Governor	
7 August 1938 to November 1938	Charles André Dumas, acting Lieutenant Governor	
November 1938 to 28 August 1941	Jean Louis Beyries, acting Lieutenant Governor	1st Term
28 August 1941 to 4 May 1944	Jean Louis Beyries, Lieutenant Governor	2nd Term
28 August 1941 to 4 May 1944	Jean Louis Beyries, Lieutenant Governor	2nd Term; Jean Chalvet acting governor from April 1942
4 May 1944 to 31 July 1945	Christian-Robert-Roger Laigret, Lieutenant Governor	
31 July 1945 to 30 April 1946	René Babin, acting Lieutenant Governor	
30 April 1946 to 27 October 1946	Georges Poirier, acting Lieutenant Governor	
Mauritania Overseas Territory of France
27 October 1946 to 19 July 1947	Georges Poirier, acting Lieutenant Governor	
19 July 1947 to 31 December 1947	Lucien Eugène Geay, acting Lieutenant Governor	
31 December 1947 to 7 August 1949	Henry Jean Marie de Mauduit, Lieutenant Governor	
7 August 1949 to 27 September 1950	Édouard Louis Terrac, acting Lieutenant Governor	
27 September 1950 to 25 April 1952	Jacques Camille Marie Rogué, Lieutenant Governor	
25 April 1952 to 23 February 1953	Pierre Messmer, acting Lieutenant Governor	
23 February 1953 to 6 April 1954	Pierre Messmer, Lieutenant Governor	
6 April 1954 to 23 June 1955	Albert Jean Mouragues, Lieutenant Governor	1st Term
23 June 1955 to 14 May 1956	Jean Paul Parisot, Lieutenant Governor	
14 May 1956 to 5 October 1958	Albert Jean Mouragues, Lieutenant Governor	2nd Term
5 October 1958 to February 1959	Henri Joseph Marie Bernard, High Commissioner	
February 1959 to 28 November 1960	Amédée Joseph Émile Jean Pierre Anthonioz, High Commissioner	
28 November 1960	Independence as the Islamic Republic of Mauritania.	

For continuation after Independence, see: Heads of state of Mauritania.

== See also ==
- Mauritania
  - Heads of state of Mauritania
  - Heads of government of Mauritania
- Lists of office-holders
