= Jean-Baptiste Victor Chazelas =

French colonial administrator (1885–1953)

Jean-Baptiste Victor Chazelas (born 23 April 1885 in Bussière-Galant; died 29 December 1953 in Nice) was a French colonial administrator. He served as acting lieutenant governor of Mauritania from August 1934 to 1 November 1934 and from 15 April 1935 to 10 November 1935.

Victor Chazelas was the son of innkeepers Eusèbe and Marguerite Chazelas. He served as a in 1906/1907 in the 63rd Infantry Regiment. In 1912 he began his career in the French colonial administration. In 1914, he was chef de cabinet of the governor of Martinique. During the First World War Chazelas served in 1915 as a second lieutenant of the 63rd Infantry Regiment at the front against the German Reich. In August 1916 he was sent to Cameroon displaced and from August 1918 to March 1919 he was one of the Armée française d'Orient. After retiring from the army Chazelas returned in June 1919 to Cameroon. There he worked as a district leader; from 1919 in Douala, from 1922 in Ebolowa and from 1925 in Kribi. For the Paris Colonial Exposition of 1931 he wrote the book Territoires africains sous mandat de la France: Cameroun et Togo. Chazelas became governor of Mauritania from August to November 1934 and again on an interim basis from April to November 1935. From April 1938 to February 1939 he served on an interim basis as the governor of the colony of Niger. In 1940, the Vichy government tried without success in placing Chazelas in Chad. Chazelas was a harsh critic of Louis Hunkanrin, calling him a communist sympathizer and insinuating that he derived a profit from his articles about slaves.
