= Chazal House =

American Greek Revival house

Coordinates: 32°47′06″N 79°55′51″W

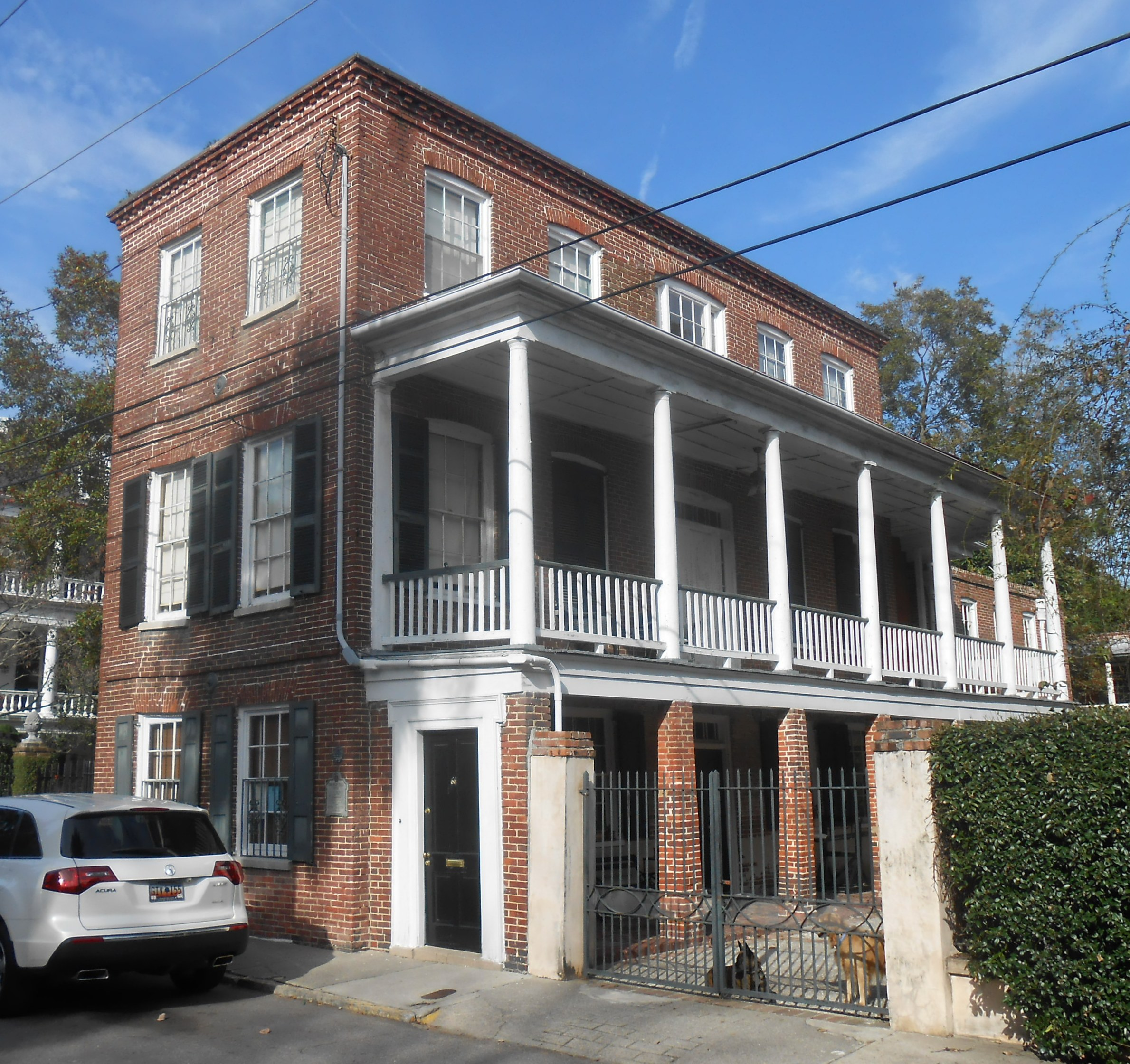
The Chazal House is a classic example of a Greek Revival single house in Ansonborough.

The Chazal House is a Greek Revival house at 66 Anson St., Charleston, South Carolina in the historic Ansonborough neighborhood.

The house was built in 1839 by the widow of a famous privateer, J.P. Chazal, who captured approximately 40 ships during the War of 1812. His widow, Elizabeth, had immigrated to Charleston from Santo Domingo after a slave rebellion on the island in 1794. Their son Dr. John P. Chazal inherited the property shortly after the house was built and held it until 1869. Following other intermediate owners, the Historic Charleston Foundation acquired the house on June 9, 1960, and resold it to Mr. and Mrs. William McIntosh III in 1963. The house was restored by the McIntosh family between 1963 and the early 1970s. The house is a fine example of a simple Greek Revival house with red Philadelphia brick run in American bond on the north and south facades and common bond (an early use in Charleston) on the front, or west, facade.

It is still privately owned.
