= Flore Hazoumé =

Congolese writer (born 1959)

- Born: 1959 (age 66–67); Brazzaville

Flore Hazoumé (born 1959) is a Congolese writer known for short stories.

== Life ==
Hazoumé was born in Brazzaville but brought up in France. She had a father from Benin and a Congolese mother. She is descended from the writer Paul Hazoumé.

She arrived back in Republic of the Congo in 1979 and attended the University of Abidjan where she studied English. She published Dating Abidjan. in 1984 and worked in advertising in the 1990s. She lived in Abidjan where she was part of literary groups. She was a secretary of the Association of Ivory Coast Writers.

She has written for adults and children and her stories have a moral message. In 2010 she was working with Josette Abondio on the magazine Scrib Spiritualité.

== Works ==
- Dating Abidjan., 1984
- Nightmares, 1994
- Revenge of the Albino, 1996
- A Good Life
- Twilight of Man
- And if we listen to our children, 2002
- At the street corner, waiting for me, 2006
- I had thee well .., 2012
