= Josette Abondio =

Ivorian teacher, writer and playwright (born 1949)

Josette Desclercs Abondio
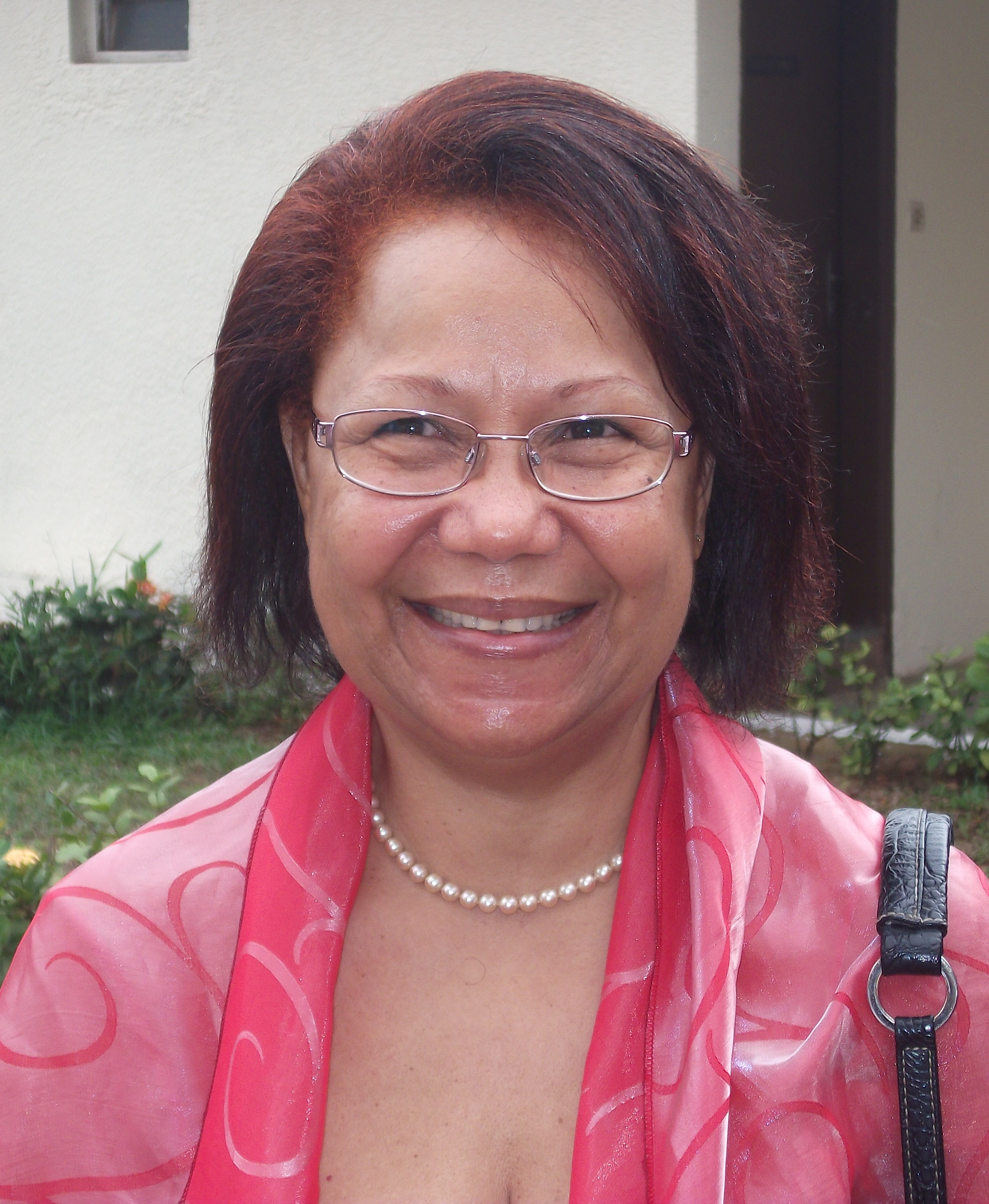
- Josette Abondio
- Born: 1949 (age 76–77); Côte d'Ivoire
- Writing career
- Genre: Fiction

Josette Desclercs Abondio or Josette Abondio (born 1949) is an Ivorian teacher, writer and playwright.

== Early life and education ==
Josette Desclercs Abondio was born in 1949 in the Ivory Coast and her first language is French. She discovered books in her childhood and became an avid reader. Abondio worked as a secondary school teacher and trainer in technical expression.

== Literary career ==
In 1993, she wrote Kouassi Koko...ma mère, which is a novel about a concubine following the death of her patron.

Her next major work in 1999 was an illustrated book for children titled Le rêve de Kimi.

Abondio was the third president of the Writers Association of the Ivory Coast (AECI) from 1998 to 2000. In 2010, she was working with Flore Hazoumé on the magazine Scrib Spiritualité.

In 2013, she was running a bookshop in Abidjan.

== Personal life ==
Abondio is keen on the martial arts and is a black belt in karate.

== Works ==
- Kouassi Koko...ma mère. Edilis. 1993. ISBN 2909238075. OCLC 33194315.
- Le rêve de Kimi. Editions Neter. 1999. ISBN 2844870236. OCLC 44010403.
- Le jardin d'Adalou. Les Classiques Ivoiriens. 2012. ISBN 9791090625136. OCLC 905395574.
- La dernière ruse de compère araignée. Les Classiques Ivoiriens. 2013. ISBN 9791090625242. OCLC 957078090.
- Le royaume du cœur, 2013
- Tant qu'elle aimeà: Nouvelles. Les Classiques Ivoiriens. 2015. ISBN 9782372230148. OCLC 956633971., a collection of short stories in French.
