= René Héctor Émile Chazal =

French colonial administrator

René Héctor Émile Chazal was a French colonial administrator. He served as lieutenant governor of Mauritania from 21 November 1929 to 19 June 1931. French soldier and former governor of Mauritania Henri Gaden sharply criticized Chazal's appointment, writing, "Chauzal knows nothing about Mauritania, nor the Moors, nor about any other populations of this type". While governor, Chazal imprisoned spiritual leader Yacouba Sylla, whom he considered a great threat. It is likely that Chazal was dismissed as lieutenant governor due to a pamphlet by Louis Hunkanrin that sharply criticized his approach to slavery.
