= Beech Island Historical Society =

Coordinates: 33.42603°N 81.88984°W

Beech Island Historical Society (BIHS) is a non-profit historical society and museum dedicated to the history of Beech Island, and its county, Aiken County, both of which are situated in the U.S. state of South Carolina.

== U.S. Federal Government grant for museum ==
The society received a $200,000 Rural Development Enterprise grant in 2005 from the United States Department of Agriculture to renovate a circa 1900 brick cottonseed barn and turn it into an agricultural museum.

== Foundation ==
The society was founded in 1985. The first president was Harold Maness.

== History ==
In 1986, the society ran the Beech Island Tricentennial Celebration at Redcliffe State Park, which attracted more than 10,000 visitors. In subsequent years, the society organized an annual event known as Beech Island Heritage Day, which was held for 20 consecutive years before the society eventually voted to end this event. The final one was in 2006.

In 1991, the heirs of George McElmurray (one of the society's charter members) donated an acre of land to the society, a big warehouse and a four-room meeting hall. The Beech Island Historical Society and Visitor's Centre was opened for tourists and visitors.

On April 3, 1998, the society won the Progress Award for the Beech Island Historical Society and Visitor's Centre building, at the Confederation of Local South Carolina Historical Societies, in Columbia, South Carolina.

In 1997, the South Carolina General Assembly passed a motion to "express their best wishes to the members of the Beech Island Historical Society as this group observes on May 24, 1997, the eleventh annual Beech Island Heritage Day."

== Today ==
Today, the society has now over 300 members. It holds monthly meetings (from September till March), which are open to the public also.

== See also ==
- List of historical societies in South Carolina
