= Chahzal =

Chahzal چهزال
- Village
- Location within Iran
- Coordinates: 33°23′32″N 48°28′30″E
- Country: Iran
- Province: Lorestan
- County: Khorramabad
- Bakhsh: Central
- Rural District: Koregah-e Sharqi

Population (2006)
  - Total: 230
- Time zone: UTC+3:30 (IRST)
  - Summer (DST): UTC+4:30 (IRDT)

Chahzal (Persian: چهزال, also Romanized as Chahzāl, Chazāl, and Chehzāl) is a village in Koregah-e Sharqi Rural District, in the Central District of Khorramabad County, Lorestan Province, Iran. At the 2006 census, its population was 230, in 47 families.
