= Malcolm de Chazal =

Mauritian writer (1902–1981)

- Born: 12 September 1902; Vacoas, Mauritius
- Died: 1 October 1981 (aged 79)
- Occupation: Painter
- Known for: Sens-Plastique

Malcolm de Chazal (12 September 1902 – 1 October 1981) was a Mauritian writer, painter, and visionary, known especially for his Sens-Plastique, a work consisting of several thousand aphorisms and pensées.

== Early life and education ==
Chazal was born in Vacoas of a French family long established in Mauritius and wrote all his works in French. Except for six years at Louisiana State University, where he received an engineering degree, he spent most of his time in Mauritius where he worked as an agronomist on sugar plantations and later for the Office of Telecommunications.

== Writing ==
In 1940 he began to publish in Mauritius a series of volumes consisting of hundreds of numbered thoughts and ideas entitled Pensées. In 1945, a seventh volume of Pensées, bound with another collection of unnumbered aphorisms entitled Sens-Plastique appeared, and two years later a separate Sens-Plastique, Volume II, appeared. It was this latter volume on which the Gallimard edition of 1948 was based that brought Chazal into prominence in France. He was hailed as a surrealist by André Breton and ex Journalist Adeenarain M Tatiah. The following examples may illustrate the novelty and variety of Sens-Plastique.

Half-opened petals give the flower an adenoidal look.

We know the halls of the eye like welcome visitors but we live in our mouth.

Any man who acts singly in the press of a mob will get trampled. Shifting into reverse while making love can kill you.

Immediately before it falls, water turns into a living being as if a person's soul had just slipped into it: look at the way it bends and twists, writhing in desperation. (What if you threw a not quite cold corpse out of an airplane—would the dead awaken?...)

In the prefaces and afterwords of the various editions of Sens-Plastique Chazal explained his method of thinking and writing as follows:

My philosophical position in this work derives from the principle that man and nature are entirely continuous, and that all parts of the human body and all expressions of the human face, including their feelings, can actually be discerned in plants, flowers, and fruits, and to an even greater extent in our other selves, animals. And although minerals are usually considered inanimate, death-like rather than life-like, I would have them also tend towards that supreme synthesis, the human form, especially when they are in motion. "Man was made in the image of God," but beyond that I declare that "Nature was made in the image of man."

But I could never have done this by reasoning. I had to rely on subconscious thinking, the only intuitive resource available to humans—which few of us ever use in an entire lifetime. . . .I should add that I could never have learned to think subconsciously without years of ascetic withdrawal. depriving my body, isolating my self, concentrating my mind and spirit. . .until by stages I had perfected what I consider to be a totally new method of writing.

Chazal's other writings include notably La Vie Filtrée (1949), a collection of essays that elaborate the ideas found in Sens-Plastique, Sens Magique (1957) and Poèmes (1968 ), gnomic verses that dramatize the experiences described in Sens-Plastique, and Petrusmok (1951), the spiritual history of Mauritius found in its natural surroundings.

Sens-Plastique has been translated into English by Irving Weiss in a volume published by Green Integer (2008) as Sens-Plastique.

== Works ==
- 1940 : Pensées I, The General Printing & Stationery Cy Ltd
- 1942 : Pensées II, The General Printing & Stationery Cy Ltd
- 1942 : Pensées III, The General Printing & Stationery Cy Ltd
- 1943 : Pensées IV, The General Printing & Stationery Cy Ltd
- 1944 : Pensées V, The General Printing & Stationery Cy Ltd
- 1944 : Pensées VI, The General Printing & Stationery Cy Ltd (Pensées I à VII reprinted: Exils, 1999)
- 1945 : Pensées et Sens-Plastique, The General Printing & Stationery Cy Ltd
- 1945 : Pensées VII, The General Printing & Stationery Cy Ltd
- 1946 : Histoire de la pensée universelle, The General Printing & Stationery Cy Ltd
- 1947 : Sens-plastique II, The General Printing & Stationery Cy Ltd, Gallimard, repr.. 1948, 1985
- 1949 : La Vie filtrée, Gallimard
- 1950 : Iésou, The Almadinah Printing Press, théâtre
- 1950 : L'Âme de la musique, The Mauritius Printing Cy Ltd
- 1950 : La Pierre philosophale, The Almadinah Printing Press
- 1950 : Penser par étapes, P.A. Bettencourt, in Réalités secrètes 1961
- 1951 : Petrusmok, The Standard Printing Est., 1951, La Table Ovale, 1979
- 1951 : Mythologie du Crève-Cœur, The Almadinah Printing Press, 1951
- 1951 : Le Rocher de Sisyphe, The Mauritius Printing Cy Ltd, 1951, Patrice Thierry-L’Ether Vague, 1996
- 1951 : Aggenèse I, The Almadinah Printing Press
- 1951 : La Clef du cosmos, The Mauritius Printing Cy Ltd, 1951, Patrice Thierry — L’Ether Vague, 1994
- 1951 : Manifeste, Aggenèse II, Révélation de la nuit, The Almadinah Printing Press, 1951
- 1952 : Le Livre de conscience, The Almadinah Printing Press, 1952, Arma Artis, 1985
- 1952 : La Grande révélation, The Almadinah Printing Press
- 1952 : La Science immortelle, The Almadinah Printing Press
- 1952 : Le Roi du monde, The Almadinah Printing Press
- 1952 : Le Pape et la science et la révélation de l’angélisme, The Almadinah Printing Press
- 1952 : Le Livre d’or, The Almadinah Printing Press
- 1952 : La Bible du mal, The Almadinah Printing Press
- 1952 : L'Évangile de l’eau, The Almadinah Printing Press
- 1952 : La Fin du monde, The Almadinah Printing Press
- 1952 : Le Livre des principes, The Almadinah Printing Press
- 1952 : Message aux Français, in Synthèse
- 1953 : Judas, Esclapon
- 1953 : Judas ou la trahison du prêtre, Popular Printing
- 1953 : L’Absolu, The Almadinah Printing Press
- 1953 : Pentateuque, The Almadinah Printing Press
- 1953 : Préambule à l’absolu, The Almadinah Printing Press
- 1954 : Les Deux infinis, The Almadinah Printing Press
- 1954 : L’Espace ou Satan, The Standard Printing Est.
- 1954 : Les Dieux ou les consciences-univers, Esclapon Ltd
- 1954 : Les Désamorantes, suivi de Le Concile des poètes, The Mauritius Printing Cy Ltd;
- 1954 : Le Sens de l’absolu, The Almadinah Printing Press
- 1957 : Sens-Magique, The Almadinah Printing Press, 1957, 1958, Lachenal et Ritter, 1983
- 1958 : Sens-Magique, 2ème édition, Tananarive
- 1958 : Apparadoxes, The Almadinah Printing Press
- 1968 : Poèmes, Jean-Jacques Pauvert
- 1973 : L'Île Maurice proto-historique…, Guillemette de Spéville
- 1974 : L’Homme et la connaissance, Jean-Jacques Pauvert
- 1974 : Sens unique, 1974, L’Ether Vague, 1985
- 1976 : La Bouche ne s’endort jamais, Saint-Germain-des-Prés, 1976, Patrice Thierry — L’Ether Vague, 1994

== Painting ==
Chazal took up painting in the 1950s at the suggestion of Georges Braque. Unlike the speculative aphoristic character of his best-known writings, his paintings concentrated on natural forms and landscapes in a primitive, emblematic style.
