= Paul Hazoumé =

Beninese writer (1890–1980)

- Born: April 15, 1890. Porto-Novo, French Dahomey
- Died: April 18, 1980 (aged 90); Cotonou, Benin
- Occupations: Writer, educator, ethnologist, politician
- Notable work: Le Pacte de sang au Dahomey (1937), Doguicimi (1938)

Paul Hazoumé (15 April 1890 – 18 April 1980) was a Beninese writer, educator, ethnologist, and politician.

== Biography ==
Born on 15 April 1890, he descended from the Porto Novo kingdom's nobility, with his grandfather being a prime minister. He studied at the Ecole William Ponty in Senegal. In 1910, he was appointed the director of the school system at Ouidah. He edited the newspaper Le Messager du Dahomey with Louis Hunkanrin during World War I while also working at the Musee de l'Homme in Paris. Along with Hunkanrin and the Zinsou Bodé brothers, Hazoumé began publishing the newspaper Le Recadere de Behanzin in 1917. Like most Beninese writers of the time, he did not criticize the French for their colonial dominance. Indeed, the French missionary Francis Aupiais helped advance his career. In 1931, on the occasion of the International Colonial Exposition, he represented Dahomey and the International Congress of intercolonial and indigenous societies. Upon his return, he was responsible for general education at the vocational school in Cotonou. Hazoumé wrote Le Pacte de sang au Dahomey in 1937 and the historical novel Doguicimi the following year, winning recognition and awards as both an ethnologist and novelist. The two books are still widely read and cited.

In the years following World War II, Hazoumé got involved in local politics, becoming secretary of the Cotonou electoral committee. He was the cofounder of the Dahomeyan Progressive Union (UPD), the first political party in present-day Benin, and played an important early role. He served as councilor to the French Union from 1947 until it dissolved in 1958, serving as Vice President of the Commission of Cultural Affairs and Overseas Civilizations. Hazoumé was a deputy to the territorial assembly from 1952 to 1957. He became chairman of the Association des Anciens du Dahomey in 1964. Hazoumé ran for president in the disputed elections of May 1968, but received a mere 11,091 votes, or 3.9 percent, which is attributable to strong regionalism. He died on 18 April 1980 at the age of 90.
