= Louis Hunkanrin =

Dahomeyan writer, educator, journalist and politician

- Born: December 25, 1887. Porto-Novo
- Died: May 28, 1964 (aged 76); Porto-Novo
- Occupations: Writer, educator, journalist, politician
- Notable work: Un forfait colonial: I'esclavage en Mauritanie (1931)

Louis Hunkanrin (25 December 1887 – 28 May 1964) was a Dahomeyan writer, educator, journalist, and politician. He was one of the earliest critics of French colonial power in his country, later renamed Benin.

== Biography ==
=== Early life ===
He was born in Porto-Novo on 25 December 1887. His father was jeweler to the kings of Porto Novo and his mother was descended from royalty. Hunkanrin was a member of the first graduating class of the Ecole William Ponty in Dakar in 1904. He returned to Ouidah in 1906 after receiving a teaching position. However, he was fired in 1910 after having a dispute with a colonial administrator over how his superior dealt with pupils. He received support from teachers and students, but thanks to a governor's notation in his record, this would be his last teaching job.

=== Journalism and political activities ===
Hunkanrin found work at the Compagnie Francaise de l'Afrique Occidentale, but was arrested in 1912 due to insulting and threatening his boss. Sent to prison in Dakar, he developed a friendship with Blaise Diagne and became more critical of French colonial rule. In 1914, he returned to Dahomey. He edited the newspaper Le Messager du Dahomey with Paul Hazoumé during World War I. He also prepared articles from abroad criticizing French treatment of Dahomeyan recruits and founded a Dahomeyan branch of the League of Human Rights. In newspaper articles, he criticized the abuses of French colonialism and urged Africans to become educated, as it was the only way they could become equal with the French administrators. Despite not calling for decolonization, he became a great annoyance to the French. Hunkanrin lived in hiding, travelling between Senegal, Dahomey, and Nigeria, and only came out of hiding in 1918 when Blaise Diagne arranged for him to volunteer for the military. It is debatable whether this was a move of political expediency or an expression of devotion to France.

Nonetheless, his military service resulted in several disputes, and he was court-marshalled in 1921 and served several months in a French prison. Hunkanrin broke off with Diagne, claiming he accepted bribes to find recruits for the army. When he returned to Dahomey in December 1921, he turned again to critical journalism. It wasn't long before he drew the ire of the French and was again imprisoned, officially for forgery. In reality, it was his militant nationalist views that led him to the jailhouse. He remained loyal to France, but as an abstraction, the France that declared the universal rights of man regardless of national origin. Hunkanrin repeatedly criticized the idea the some French people had more rights than others.

=== Exiles and disturbances ===
From jail, he indirectly played a role in the Porto-Novo disturbances of 1923. He incited the populations of Porto-Novo and Cotonou not to pay taxes and supported a Nigerian resident for the Porto-Novo throne, which earning him accusations of being too pro-British. Demonstrations ensued for the throne claimant, and a dockyard strike broke out in Porto-Novo and Cotonou. Smaller strikes also took place in more agricultural areas, all of which the French brutally suppressed. At his trial for his involvement, Hunkanrin cited an 1882 treaty between Porto-Novo and France, as well as the fact he was behind bars at the time. The French administration was not impressed, and Hunkanrin and 10 others were sentenced to ten years exile in Mauritania.

In 1931, he published a scathing expose of slavery in Mauritania, Un forfait colonial: I'esclavage en Mauritanie. As he stated in the preface, its purpose was to "illuminate the true face of France in this territory where the French flag flies – emblem of peace, liberty, and justice: the France of the Rights of Man, maternal France, good, generous and just, ... It is well understood that I am only to serve the interests of France and humanity." The book received a mixed reception but generated an internal inquiry by French administrators. Lieutenant Governor Jean-Baptiste Victor Chazelas dismissed the tract as propaganda inspired by Hunkanrin's Communist friends in Paris, and criticized the way he received information from female slaves and prostitutes. While the tract is now seen as an important historical document of modern slavery, it is generally acknowledged that Hunkanrin committed some flaws, such as not distinguishing between harantin and slaves.

When he returned to Dahomey in 1933, he began studying traditional customs and seemed to have genuinely been changed by the exile. Nonetheless, in 1934 he co-authored two articles in La Voix du Dahomey along with Louis Ignacio-Pinto that were critical of French administrators. He served a brief jail sentence and moved out of the spotlight for a few years. When World War II broke out, he sided with Charles DeGaulle and his Free French forces. Hunkanrin found employment as a British spy and recruited soldiers to the war effort in Nigeria. He was arrested in 1941 for undermining the Vichy regime, and at his trial in Dakar he was sentenced to death. This was later commuted to eight years exile in Mali. When French West Africa rallied to the Free French in 1942, the same officials remained in Dahomey and Hunkanrin was not released. In fact, it took a public campaign to secure his release nearly two years after the war ended.

=== Freedom and later life ===
When Hunkanrin was freed in 1947, he again became involved in politics and joined the Porto-Novo electoral committee in the years before a political party was formed in Dahomey. He was appointed the chairman of the important pressure group Union des Anciens du Dahomey in 1950. That year, he edited the L'Eveil newspaper in Porto-Novo. When Dahomey received its independence in 1960, Hunkanrin was deemed too old to serve in any full-time government position. Instead, he was a special consultant to both Hubert Maga and Sourou-Migan Apithy. Hunkanri died in Porto Novo on 28 May 1964, and was eulogized by French speakers for combating colonial abuses and for being the first nationalist in Dahomey. He was posthumously awarded the title of "Grande Officier de l'Ordre National du Dahomey".
