= Historic Charleston Foundation =

Historic preservation nonprofit in South Carolina, U.S.

Coordinates: 32°46′24″N 79°55′38″W

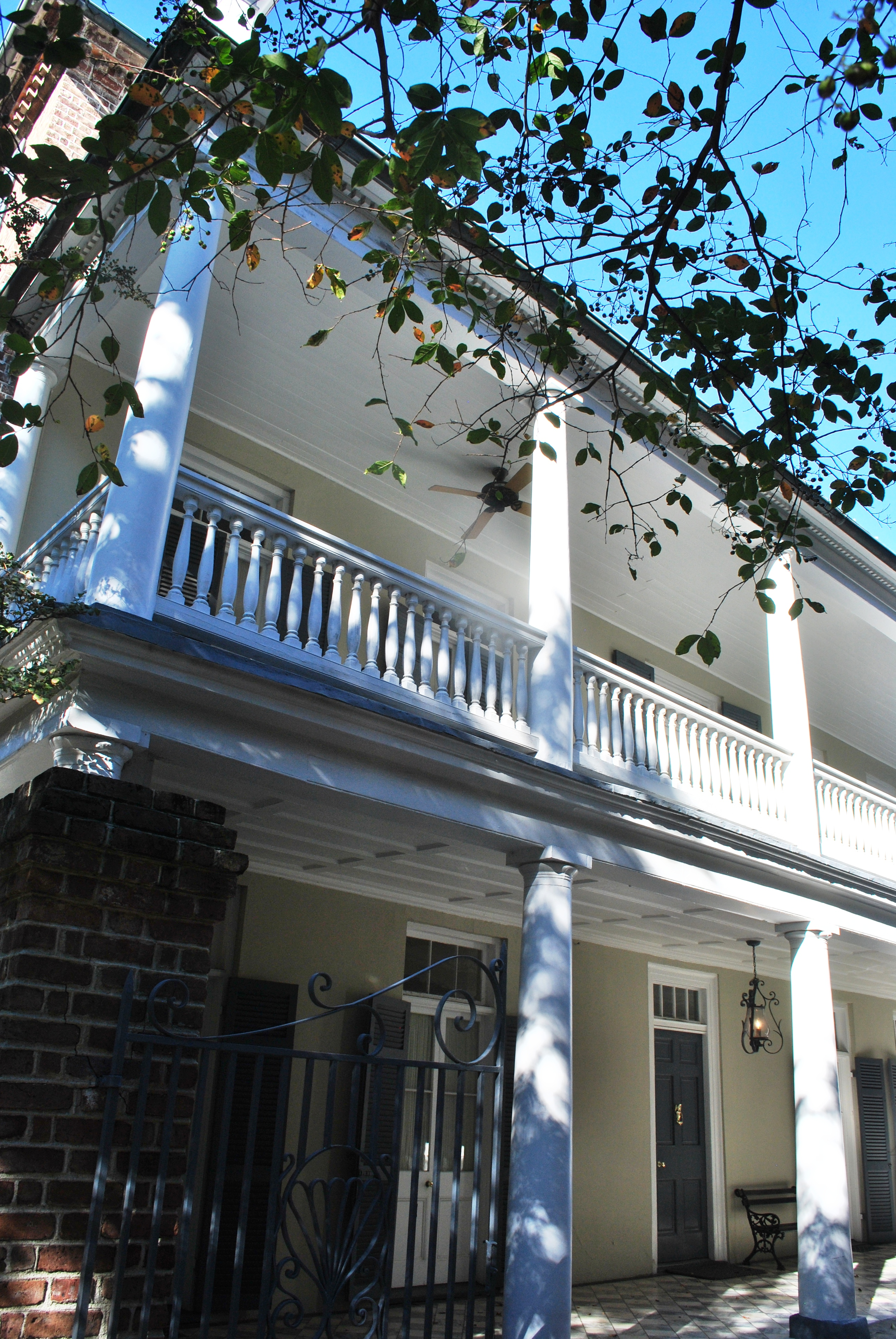
Thomas Bee's House, Charleston, ca. 1730. The 1st-floor sitting room was the location of the original headquarters of Historic Charleston Foundation

Historic Charleston Foundation (HCF) was founded in 1947 to preserve and protect the integrity of the architectural, historical, and cultural heritage of Charleston, South Carolina, United States. The Foundation undertakes advocacy, and participates in community planning, educational and volunteer programs. Its focus is on preservation of historic places, research, and technical and financial assistance programs for the preservation of historic properties. Winslow Hastie has been the President & CEO of Historic Charleston Foundation since 2018.

== History ==
Established in 1947, Historic Charleston Foundation (HCF) is a nonprofit organization that advocates for the historic authenticity, cultural character and livability of the Charleston region through advocacy, stewardship and community engagement.

=== Revolving fund ===
The foundation was the first organization in the country to develop a revolving fund as a preservation strategy. Established in 1957 with $100,000 raised by the foundation, HCF continues to use the revolving fund to purchase endangered historic properties, stabilize them and sell them to preservation-minded individuals with restrictive easements attached. Proceeds from the sale are used to replenish the fund. The fund enabled the foundation to begin the Ansonborough Rehabilitation Project in 1958, an effort to save a six-block neighborhood bordered by Market, Calhoun, East Bay and Meeting streets. Over a 12-year period, more than 60 structures were rehabilitated. Properties saved include the Benjamin Simons Neufville House.

The revolving fund was revitalized in 2004 with a $300,000 gift from the estate of Mrs. Charles Henry (Elizabeth) Woodward. With this seed money, HCF purchased 79 Anson Street and 9 George Street, both of which were sold with protective covenants to preservation-minded buyers. In 2005, HCF purchased 13 Pitt Street, one of the largest properties in Harleston Village, and one that retains much of its original historic fabric. It was also sold to a buyer who placed protective covenants on the property.

Historic Charleston Foundation partnered with Charleston's Habitat for Humanity and the City of Charleston in 2010 on the rehabilitation of a small, single-style house on Lee Street (completed in February 2011). This was the first joint project between the three entities. The City of Charleston's Department of Housing and Urban Development identified the property and family in need. Charleston Habitat for Humanity (HFH) confirmed that the family met requirements for assistance and is supervising subcontractors and volunteers. HCF has been involved in the preservation of the historic elements of the building and is contributing funds for the joint project through its Neighborhood Impact Initiative program. Restrictive covenants were placed on the house on Lee Street by HCF at the completion of the project to protect the property's historic integrity.

== Museums ==
=== Aiken-Rhett House ===
48 Elizabeth Street

The Aiken-Rhett House is the centerpiece of a townhouse complex that extends from Ann Street to Mary Street. Built in 1818 and greatly expanded by Gov. and Mrs. William Aiken Jr. in the 1830s and 1850s, the house has been little altered since 1858.

A businessman, rice planter, politician and governor of South Carolina, William Aiken Jr. was one of the state's wealthiest citizens. Following tradition among Charleston's elite, Aiken and his wife, Harriet Lowndes Aiken, traveled in Europe and returned with fine art and furnishings. Some of these objects can be seen in the rooms for which they were purchased.

The Aiken-Rhett House remained in the family until 1975, when its last resident bequeathed it to the Charleston Museum. It has been owned and managed as a museum by Historic Charleston Foundation since 1995.

=== Nathaniel Russell House ===
51 Meeting Street

The Nathaniel Russell House is a National Historic Landmark. The house is furnished with period antiques and works of art, many of the pieces having connections to the Russell family. The museum staff interpret the lives of the Russell family and the African-American slaves who lived on the property. The House was designated a National Historic Landmark in 1960 and added to the National Register of Historic Places in 1973.

In 2007, Historic Charleston Foundation urged the City of Charleston to undertake the development of a new Preservation Plan to update its 1975 plan and donated $75,000 to begin the process as a part of its 60th anniversary celebration. Adopted in 2008, the plan's recommendations address 21st century issues, including land use and zoning, public education of preservation issues, a detailed analysis of historic neighborhoods, affordable housing, transportation, and the design review process.

In 2008, HCF was recognized by the state of South Carolina with an "Angel Award," recognizing 10 nonprofit organizations statewide as models of charitable organizations whose philanthropic funding effectively and efficiently support their missions. In 2009, HCF and the city's new Preservation Plan were recognized by the National Trust for Historic Preservation with one of its national awards.

In 2023, HCF voted to sell the house as part of new strategic plans, which caused concern among citizens of Charleston. The following year, they reversed their decision to sell.

== See also ==
- List of historical societies in South Carolina

== External ==
- HCF website
