= Antoine Chazal =

French painter

- Born: 8 November 1793; Paris, France
- Died: 12 August 1854 (aged 60); Paris, France
- Known for: Painting, engraving

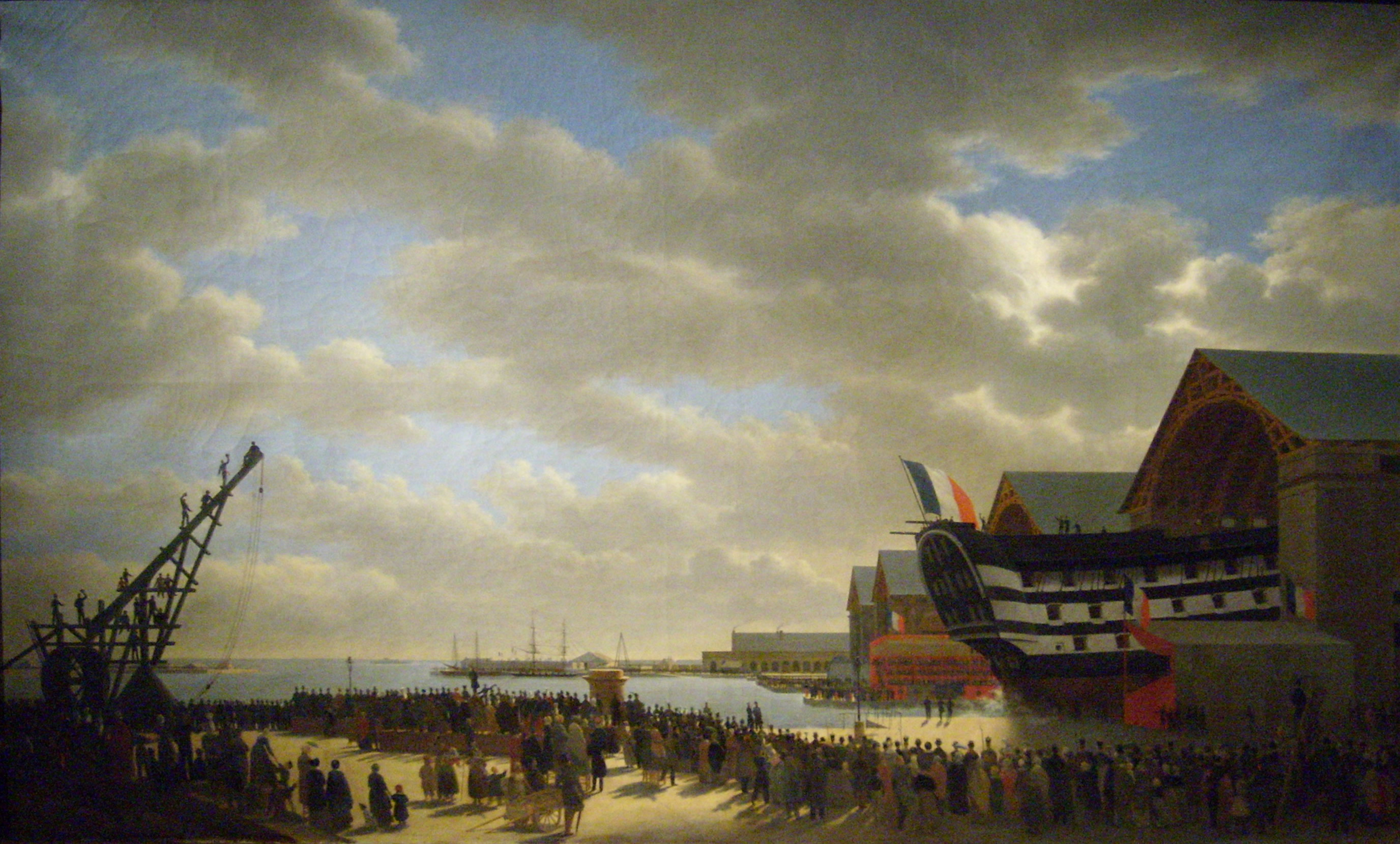
"Lancement du Friedland" by Chazal; Musée Thomas-Henry in Cherbourg-en-Cotentin.

Antoine Chazal (8 November 1793 – 12 August 1854) was a French painter of flowers and of portraits, as well as an engraver. He was born in Paris. He studied under Misbach, Bidauld, and Van Spaendonck, and became Professor of Iconography at the Jardin des Plantes. Besides portraits, flowers, and fruit, he painted a few landscapes and altar-pieces for churches. He also engraved a portrait of Cardinal La Fare. Chazal died in Paris in 1854.

He was the brother-in-law of writer and activist Flora Tristan, and through her, the great-uncle of painter Paul Gauguin.

== Engravings ==
Chazal drew many effigies for the engraver and publisher Ambroise Tardieu, who does not mention it in his prints (see below the legends of the portraits)

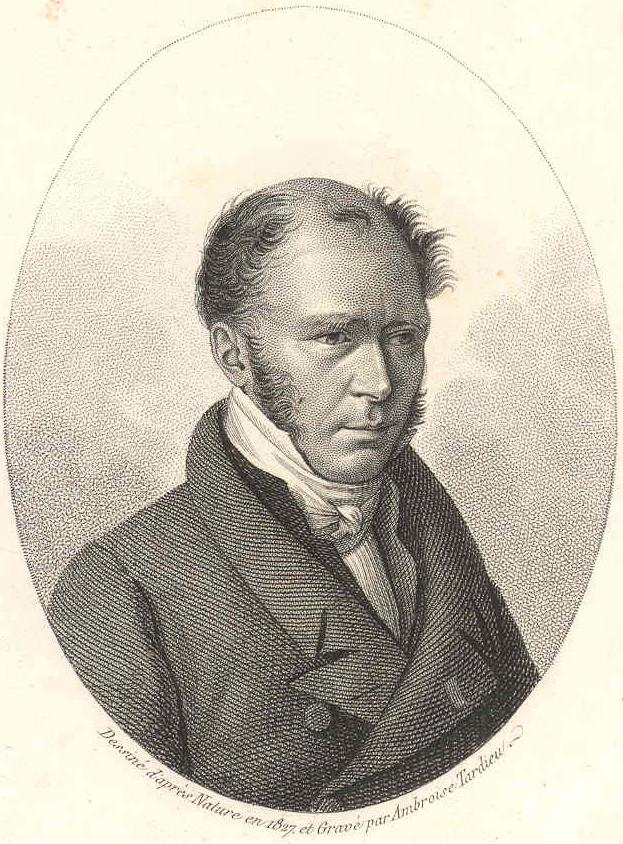
Alexandre Henri Gabriel de Cassini

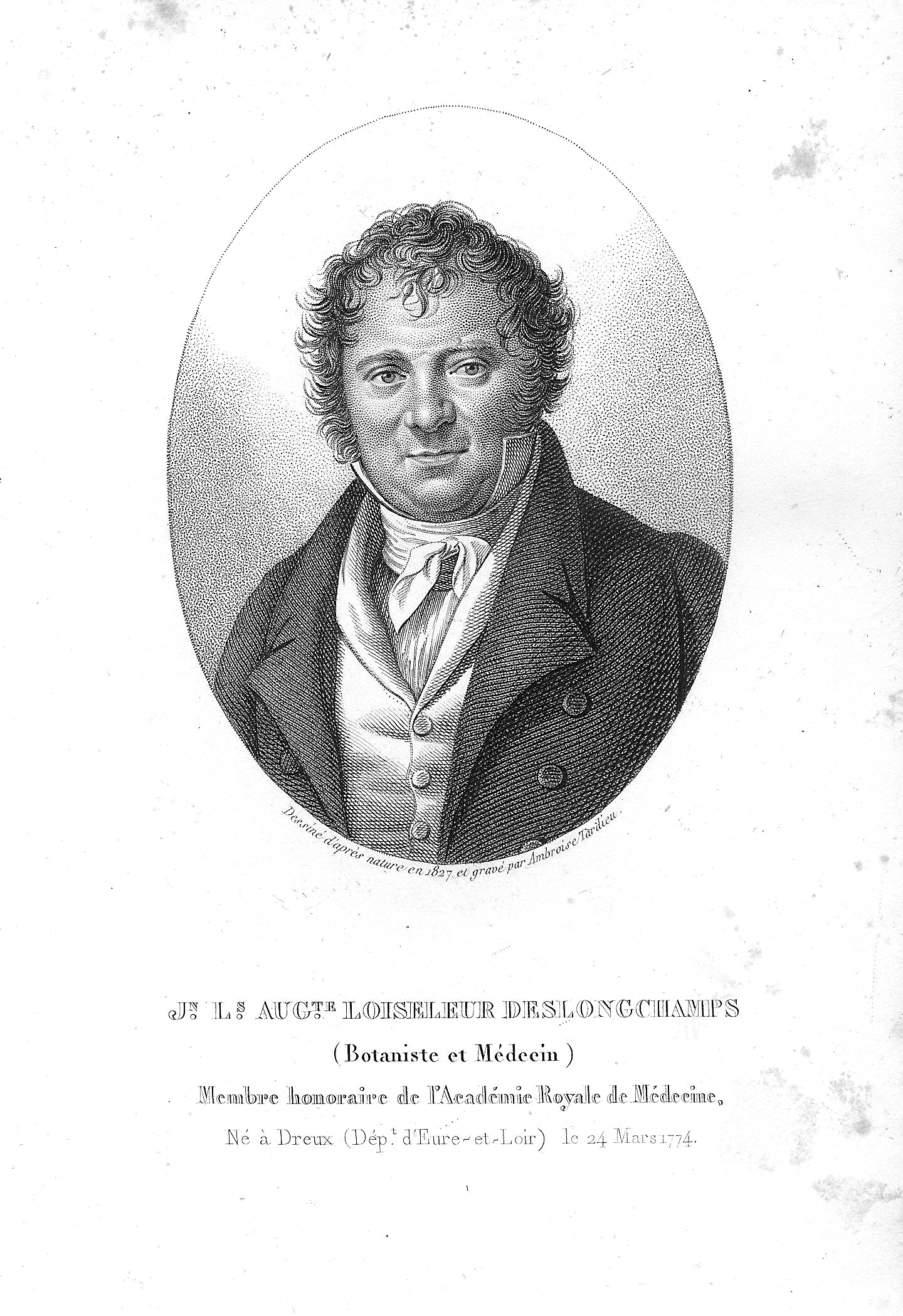
Jean-Louis-Auguste Loiseleur-Deslongchamps

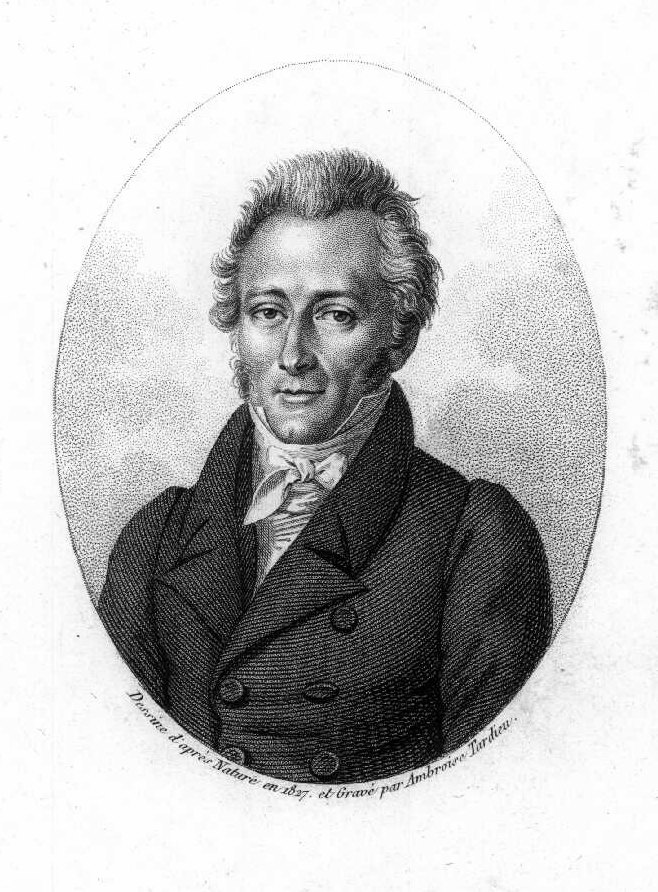
Benjamin Gaillon
