= Sallie Rhett Roman =

Southern writer (1844–1921)

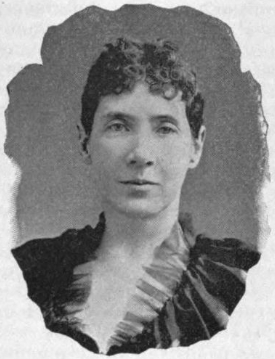
- Born: Sarah Sally de Saussure Taylor Rhett; February 3, 1844; Washington, DC
- Died: November 2, 1921 (aged 77); Columbia, South Carolina
- Years active: 1891–1920
- Known for: Southern writer
- Spouse: Alfred Roman
- Children: 5
- Father: Robert Barnwell Rhett
- Relatives: R. Barnwell Rhett Jr. (brother); Alfred M. Rhett (brother)
- Family: Fendall family De Saussure family

Sarah "Sallie" de Saussure Taylor Rhett Roman (1844–1921) was an American journalist and writer. Born into Southern aristocracy as the daughter of South Carolina congressman Robert Barnwell Rhett, she started a writing career to support her family after the death of her husband. Her writing focused on nostalgia for the Lost Cause and glorification of the plantation system. She was a contributor to the New Orleans Times-Democrat newspaper for nearly three decades.

== Biography ==
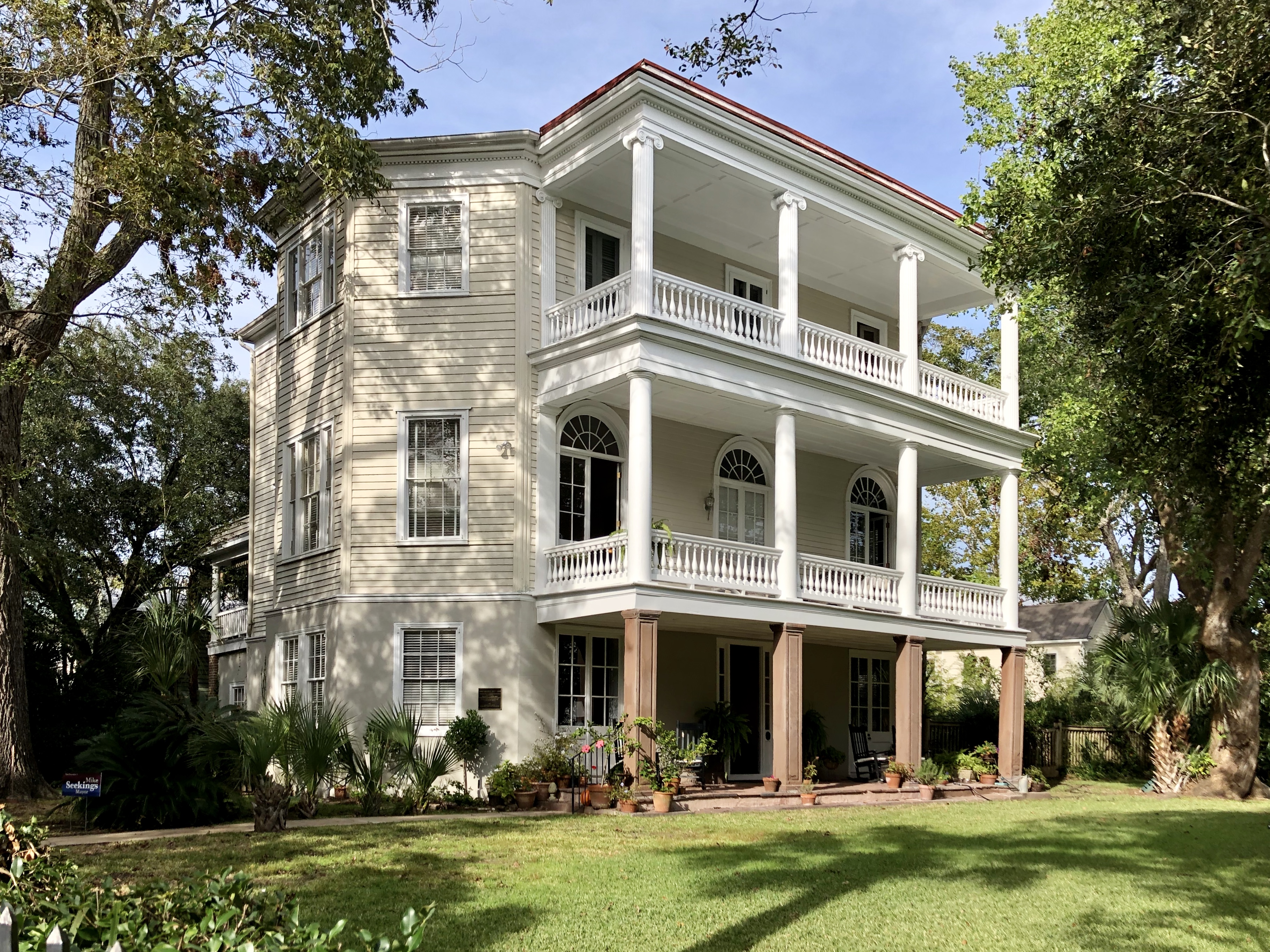
Childhood home of Sallie Rhett, the Robert Barnwell Rhett House

Sarah "Sallie" Rhett was born in Washington, DC on February 3, 1844, while her father was serving as a congressman from South Carolina. When not living in Washington, Sallie Rhett grew up in Charleston, South Carolina at the family's manor, today known as the Robert Barnwell Rhett House. Her mother was a descendant of Henry William de Saussure, of the prominent De Saussure family. The De Saussure family arrived in South Carolina originally from Lucerne, Switzerland. Due to her mother's influence, Sallie Rhett was educated at home by a French governess, becoming well educated in music and the French language.

Rhett's father was known as a Fire-Eater and ardent supporter of the Confederate cause. He managed a plantation with 190 slaves on Beaufort, Port Royal Island and owned the Charleston Mercury that advocated strongly for the Confederate cause. Sallie Rhett's brothers were similarly minded towards the confederacy. Her brother would later manage the paper, as well as become a reconstruction-era editor of the New Orleans Times-Picayune.

=== Marriage and move to New Orleans ===
In 1863, Sallie Rhett became the second wife of Colonel Alfred Roman, a lawyer who was the son of Louisiana Governor André Bienvenu Roman. The match was a strong political and economic one for Rhett's family. Alfred Roman was well connected in Southern society. His first wife (and first cousin) was the daughter of Valcour Aime, one of the richest Creole planters in Louisiana. At the time, Alfred Roman was a Confederate officer who served in the staff of P.G. T. Beauregard. Raised Protestant, Rhett converted to Roman Catholicism at the time of her marriage. Sallie Rhett and her family made their permanent residence on Esplanade Avenue in New Orleans, while her husband continued his war service until the end of the Civil War.

In New Orleans, Rhett Roman became part of the city's social elite, joining the Geographics and the Quarante Club, literary societies for women in the city. Not long after their marriage, in 1865, Rhett Roman's husband Alfred Roman fathered a son, Gustave A.V. Roman with Louisa Parker, a woman enslaved on the plantation ran by his father, André Bienvenu Roman.

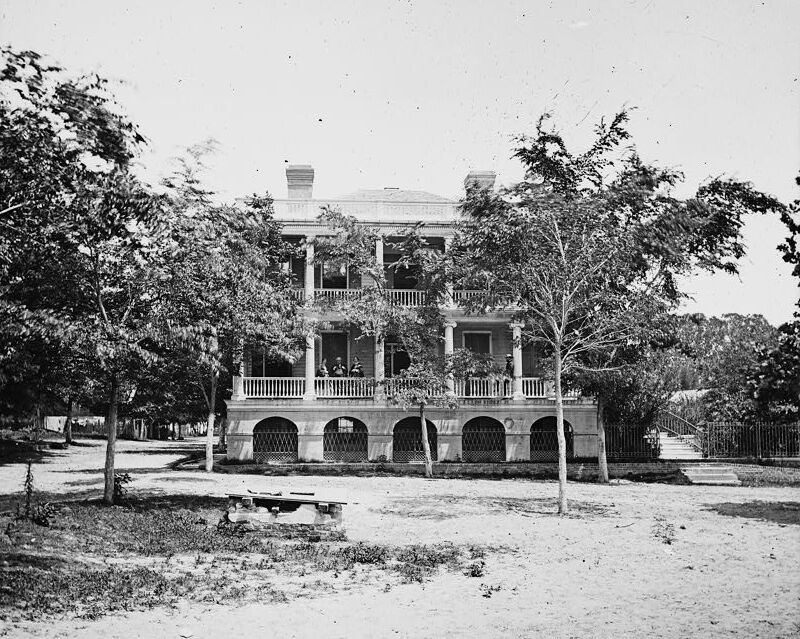
Rhett Family plantation on Beaufort, Port Royal Island

=== Reconstruction and financial crisis ===
Sallie Rhett Roman's aristocratic life as a Southern belle was impacted heavily by the Civil War. The family's income from the Roman family's sugar plantation was decimated by reconstruction, and the property was eventually lost to creditors. The Rhett family plantation on Port Royal Island and its 300 slaves, was occupied by the Union Army and later became part of the Port Royal Experiment. After returning from military service, her husband Alfred Roman maintained a law practice in New Orleans to supplement their income, later becoming heavily involved in Democratic politics. In 1877, Alfred Roman was appointed a Judge of the New Orleans Criminal Court in 1877, serving until the expiry of his term in 1888. When Alfred Roman died in 1892 after a long illness, Sallie Rhett Roman and her minor children were in dire financial straights.

=== Writing career ===
In 1891, Sallie Rhett Roman began writing for the New Orleans Times-Democrat. She would contribute fiction and editorial pieces for the paper until 1920. In her writings, Sallie Rhett Roman lamented about the fall of the former Southern way of life, and the Southern ruling elite. Rhett Roman did not use her full name when signing her pieces, masking her gender in her bylines. She did so in order to protect her family from public critique, as well as to insulate her support for the ruling elite.

In 1920, Rhett Roman returned to South Carolina. She died in Columbia, South Carolina on November 2, 1921.
