= Robert Barnwell Rhett House =

Historic house in South Carolina, United States

- U.S. National Register of Historic Places
- U.S. National Historic Landmark
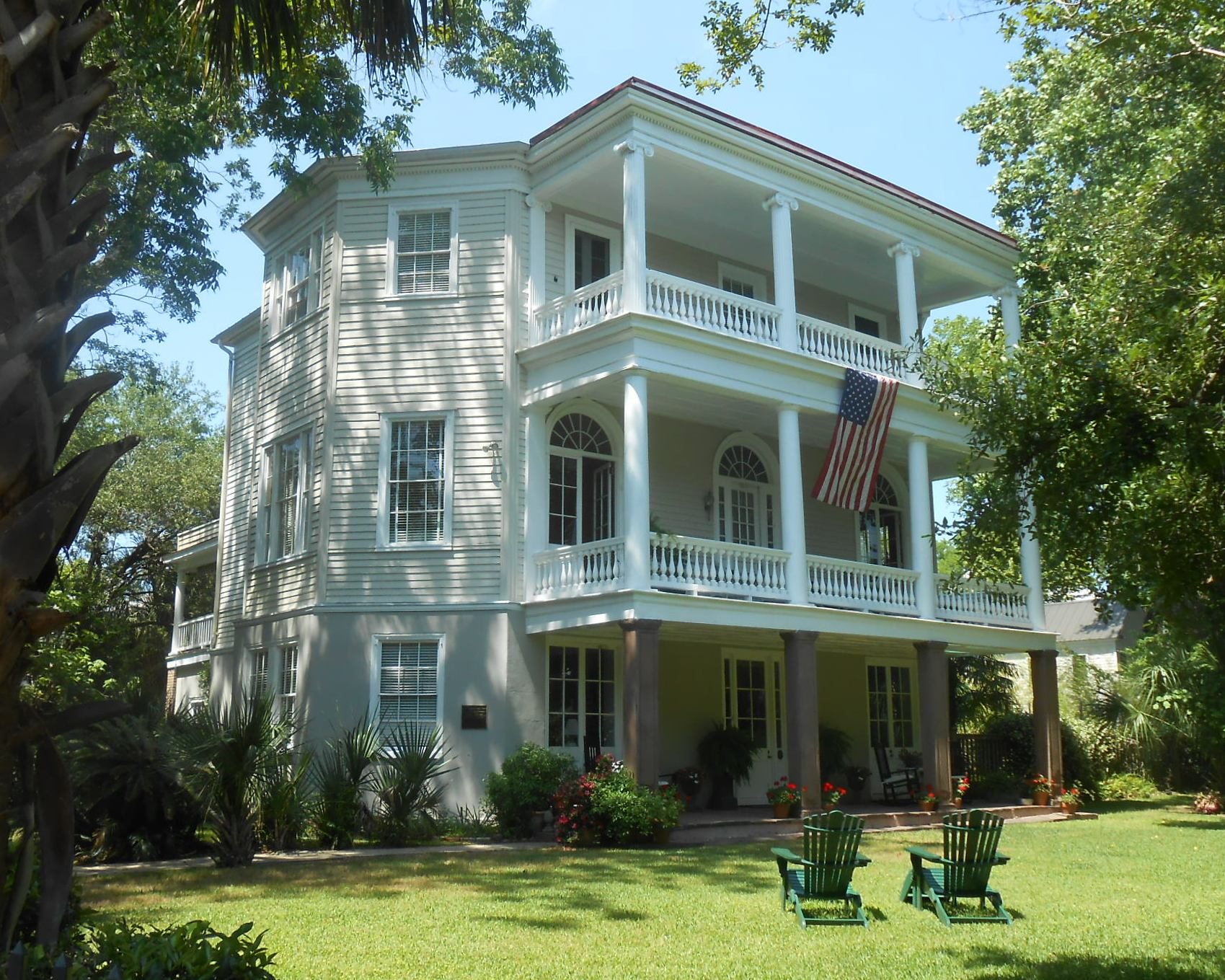
- Robert Rhett House in 2013

- Location within South Carolina Location within the United States
- Location: 6 Thomas St., Charleston, South Carolina
- Coordinates: 32°47′10″N 79°56′33″W
- Built: 1844
- NRHP reference No.: 73001691

Significant dates
- Added to NRHP: November 7, 1973
- Designated NHL: November 7, 1973

The Robert Barnwell Rhett House is a historic house at 6 Thomas Street in Charleston, South Carolina. A National Historic Landmark, it is significant as the home of Robert Barnwell Rhett, a leading secessionist politician. He opposed John C. Calhoun to lead the Bluffton Movement for separate state action on the Tariff of 1842. Rhett was one of the leading fire-eaters at the Nashville Convention of 1850, which failed to endorse his aim of secession.

The house was likely built by James Legare in a proper classical manner. Legare sold the house in 1856 to Robert Barnwell Rhett, who made it his home until 1863. During that time, his son, newspaper editor Robert Barnwell Rhett Jr., also occupied the house. George Trenholm bought the house from Rhett in 1863 but kept it only until 1866. Theodore Wagner next bought the house but very quickly resold it to a trustee for Susan Hanckel for $10,000 in 1867. The Hanckels held the house for about 70 years before selling it to the Shahid family in 1940.

The house has an enduring bit of Charleston lore associated with it. Along Vanderhorst St. (bordering the property to the south) are large and very decorative iron gates. The set of gates to the west is said to have been the spot where a woman bid farewell to her fiancé, telling him as he left that she would not reopen the gates until he returned. The man was killed in the Civil War, and no subsequent occupant of the house has reopened the gates to this day; they remain locked shut.

The house was declared a National Historic Landmark in 1973.

== See also ==
- List of National Historic Landmarks in South Carolina
- National Register of Historic Places listings in Charleston, South Carolina
- Rhett House Inn
- Col. William Rhett House
