= De Saussure (surname) =

Saussure, de Saussure, or DeSaussure is a surname of French origin. Notable individuals with this surname include:

- Albertine Necker de Saussure (1766–1841), Swiss writer, educationalist, and advocate of education for women, daughter of Horace-Bénédict, and sister of Nicolas-Théodore
- César-François de Saussure (1705–1783), Swiss travel writer
- Éric de Saussure (1925–2007), Swiss artist and member of the Taizé Community
- Ferdinand de Saussure (1857–1913), Swiss linguist, brother of Léopold and René
- Henri Louis Frédéric de Saussure (1829–1905), Swiss mineralogist and entomologist (taxonomist), and father of Ferdinand, Léopold and René.
- Henry William de Saussure (1763–1839), American lawyer, state legislator from South Carolina, president of the U.S. Mint
- Hermine de Saussure (1901–1984), female sailing pioneer and scholar, specialist of Jean-Jacques Rousseau, daughter of Léopold and mother of Delphine Seyrig
- Horace-Bénédict de Saussure (1740–1799), Genevan physicist and Alpine traveller
- Léopold de Saussure (1866–1925), sinologist, astronomer, French Naval Officer, brother of Ferdinand and René
- Louis D. DeSaussure (1824–1888), American slave trader
- Nicolas-Théodore de Saussure (1767–1845), chemist, son of Horace-Bénédict, and brother of Albertine
- Raymond de Saussure (1894–1971), Swiss psychoanalyst
- René de Saussure (1868–1943), Swiss Esperantist and scientist, brother of Ferdinand and Léopold
- William F. De Saussure (1792–1870), U.S. Senator from South Carolina
- Wilmot Gibbes de Saussure (1822–1886), Confederate-American military officer, South Carolina politician, historian

== See also ==
- De Saussure family
