= Rhett =

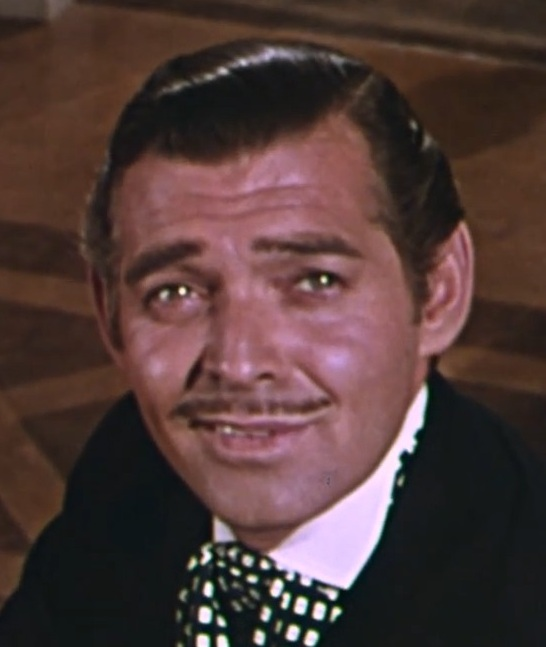
- Clark Gable as Rhett Butler in Gone with the Wind.
- Gender: Primarily masculine
- Language: English

Origin
- Meaning: Anglicization of the Dutch surname de Raedt, meaning advice.

Rhett is both a given name and a surname that is an Anglicization of the Dutch surname de Raedt, meaning advice. It was popularized by the character Rhett Butler in the 1936 novel Gone with the Wind by American author Margaret Mitchell and the 1939 film adaptation.

Notable people with the name include:

== Given name ==
- Rhett Akins (born 1969), American country singer and songwriter
- Rhett Bernstein (born 1987), American soccer player
- Rhett Biglands (born 1977), former Australian rules footballer
- Rhett Davies (born 1949), English record producer and engineer
- Rhett Forrester (1956–1994), American musician and lead singer of the band Riot
- Rhett Harty (born 1970), American former soccer defender
- Rhett Hall (born 1968), American National Football League defensive lineman
- Rhett Kouba (born 1999), American baseball player
- Rhett Lawrence, record producer and songwriter
- Rhett Lockyear (born 1983), Australian cricket player
- Rhett Lowder (born 2002), American baseball pitcher
- Rhett McLaughlin (born 1977), YouTube personality
- Rhett Miller (born 1970), lead singer of the alternative country band Old 97's
- Rhett Titus, ring name of professional wrestler Everett Lawrence Titus (born 1987)
- Rhett Warrener (born 1976), Canadian retired hockey defenceman
- Rhett Wiseman (born 1994), American baseball player

== Surname ==
- Alicia Rhett (1915–2014), American portrait painter and actress; acted in Gone with the Wind
- Cecily Rhett (contemporary), American film editor
- Errict Rhett (born 1970), American professional football player
- Robert Rhett (1800–1876), American secessionist politician from South Carolina; U.S. senator 1850–1852; Confederate congressman
  - R. Barnwell Rhett Jr. (1828–1905), newspaper editor, Confederate officer
  - Alfred M. Rhett (1829–1889), planter, Confederate officer
- William Rhett (fl. early 18th century), American colonial leader from South Carolina

== Stage name ==
- Thomas Rhett (born 1990), American singer

== Fictional characters ==
- Rhett Butler, from the 1936 novel and 1939 film Gone with the Wind
- Rhett the Boston Terrier, official costumed mascot of the Boston University and Boston University Academy Terriers
