= R. Barnwell Rhett =

R. Barnwell Rhett may refer to:

- Robert Barnwell Rhett
- R. Barnwell Rhett Jr.
