= De Saussure =

Saussure, de Saussure or DeSaussure may refer to:

- De Saussure (surname)
- De Saussure family
- Collège de Saussure, Lancy, Switzerland
- 13580 de Saussure, an asteroid
- Saussure (crater), a lunar crater
- Saussure Glacier

== See also ==
- Fortunatov–de Saussure law, a principle of linguistics
- Saussure's long-nosed bat
- Saussure's shrew (Sorex saussurei)
- Saussurea, a genus of flowering plants
