= Thomas Rhett (disambiguation) =

Thomas Rhett (born 1990) is an American country music singer-songwriter.

Thomas Rhett may also refer to:

- Thomas Grimke Rhett (1821-1878), American army officer who served in the U.S. army during Mexican-American War and the Confederate army in the American Civil War
- Thomas Rhett Smith (1768-1829), 21st mayor of Charleston, South Carolina, United States
- Thomas Rhett (EP), 2012 self-titled debut extended play by country musician Thomas Rhett Akins Jr.

== See also ==
- Rhett
