= Roger de Weck =

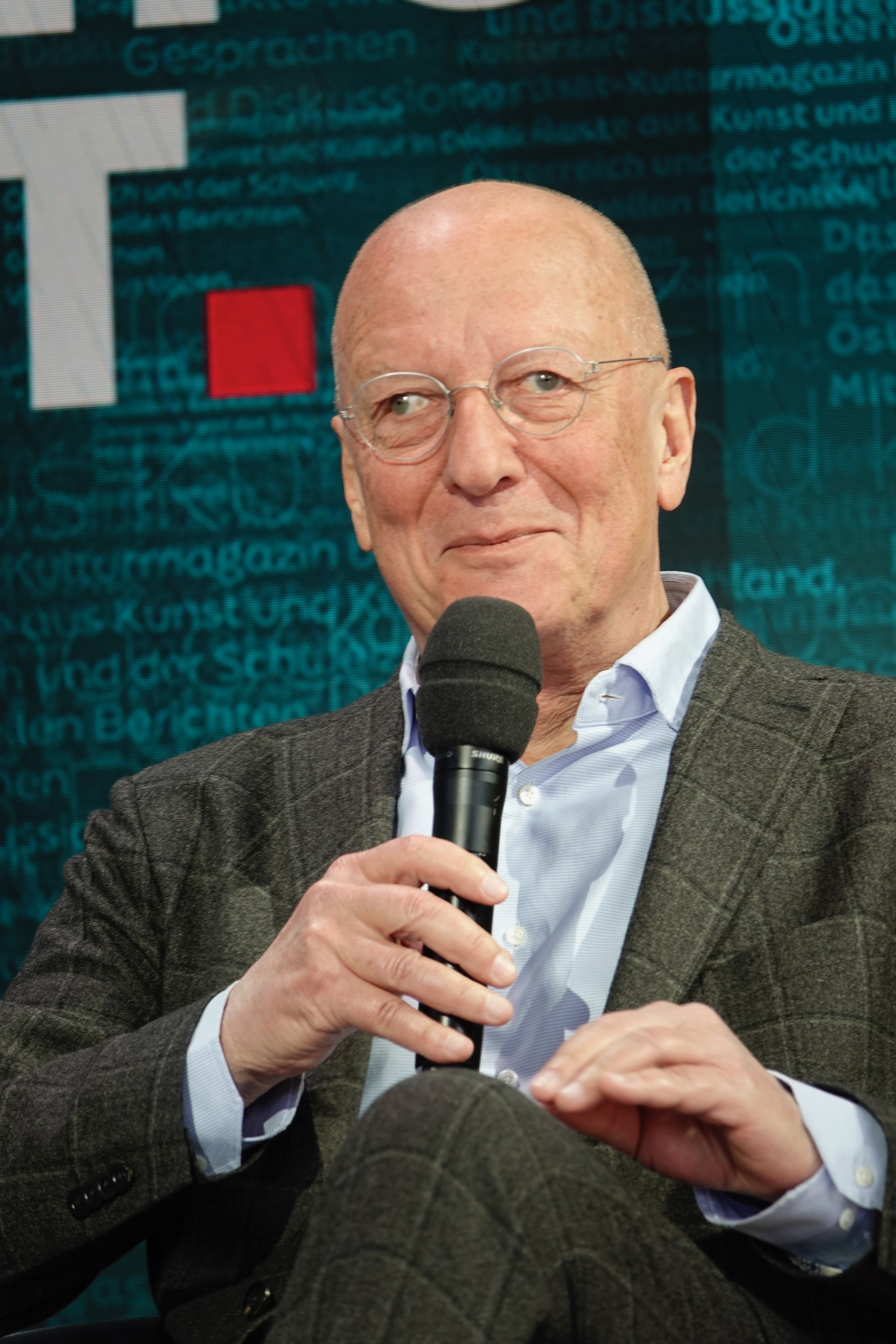
- De Weck in 2025

General Director of Swiss Radio and Television
- In office 1 January 2011 – 30 November 2017
- Preceded by: Armin Walpen
- Succeeded by: Gilles Marchand

Personal details
- Born: Roger François Philippe de Weck; 17 October 1953 (age 71); Fribourg, Switzerland
- Relations: De Weck family De Saussure family
- Children: 4
- Occupation: Journalist, publicist, business executive

Roger François Philippe de Weck (born 17 October 1953) is a Swiss journalist, publicist and executive who most notably served as CEO of Swiss Radio and Television between 2011 and 2017. Previously he was Editor-in-chief of Tages-Anzeiger between 1992 and 1997.

== Early life and education ==
De Weck was born 17 October 1953 in Fribourg, Switzerland, the fourth of seven children, to Philippe de Weck, a banking executive, and Alix de Weck (née de Saussure; 1921–2014). His siblings are; Béatrice Nicollier (née de Weck), Christine Snoy (née de Weck), Pierre de Weck, Irène de Weck, Marie-Gabrielle Pighini (née de Weck) and Sophie de Weck Haddad.

His father, Philippe de Weck (1919–2009), served as president of the Swiss Bank Corporation (SBG), the predecessor of UBS, between 1976 und 1980. He is descended from Patrician families on both his paternal side and maternal side. De Weck is a member of the De Weck and De Saussure family. Through his maternal grandmother he is also a descendant of the Von Bonstetten family.

In 1966, the family relocated to Zurich, due to his fathers position with SBG. He completed his schooling there and studied economics at the University of St. Gallen.

== Career ==
From 1982 to 1993, de Weck worked as reporter for German weekly Die Zeit. From 1993 to 1997 he worked as editor-in-chief for Swiss newspaper Tages-Anzeiger and from 1998 as editor-in-chief for Die Zeit. From 2001 to 2010 he worked as a free journalist for different newspapers.

At a public meeting organized by de Wecke and writer Adolf Muschg in September 2002, more than 1,500 people signed a petition calling for Christoph Marthaler's reinstatement as artistic director of the Schauspielhaus Zürich.

De Weck later served as CEO of Swiss Radio and Television from 2011 to 2017.

In 2023, de Weck was appointed by Germany’s state governments as a member of an expert group advising on a reform of country’s public broadcasting.

== Personal life ==
De Weck is married to Claudia de Weck (born 1953), originally from Zurich. They have four children;

- Margaux de Weck, a lecturer.
- Laura-Laure de Weck (born 1981), a dramaturgist and literature critic.
- Fanny de Weck (born 1982), a lawyer.
- Joseph de Weck (born 1986), a historian, politologist and columnist.

De Weck resides in Bern and Zurich.

== Works by Weck ==
- Der Fall Chiasso (together with Max Mabillard). Tribune, Geneva 1977.
- Kuhschweizer und Sauschwaben. Schweizer, Deutsche und ihre Hassliebe (ed. together with Jürg Altwegg). Nagel & Kimche, Munich 2003, ISBN 3-312-00315-6.
- Nach der Krise. Gibt es einen anderen Kapitalismus? Nagel & Kimche, Munich 2009, ISBN 978-3-312-00454-6.
- ÄÄSind die Schweizer die besseren Deutschen? Der Hass auf die kleinen Unterschiede (together with Jürg Altwegg). Nagel & Kimche, Munich 2010, ISBN 978-3-312-00457-7.
- Die Kraft der Demokratie – Eine Antwort auf die autoritären Reaktionäre. Suhrkamp Verlag, Berlin 2020, ISBN 978-3-518-42931-0.
