= Weck =

Weck may refer to:

- de Weck, a Swiss patrician family from Fribourg
- Beef on weck, a roast beef sandwich on a kummelweck roll
- WECK, a radio station (1230 AM, 102.9 FM, 100.5 FM) in metro Buffalo, New York
- Kummelweck, a salty roll similar to a Kaiser roll commonly shortened to “weck"
- Weck jar, a German company popular for its glass jars
- Peter Weck (born 1930), Austrian actor
