= Philippe de Weck =

- De Weck, c. 1995
- Born: Philippe de Weck; 2 January 1919; Fribourg, Switzerland
- Died: 11 December 2009 (aged 90); Fribourg, Switzerland
- Education: Collège Saint-Michel
- Alma mater: University of Fribourg (Licentiate)
- Occupations: Banker, banking executive, attorney
- Known for: Banking
- Title: Chairman and CEO of Swiss Bank Corporation
- Term: 1976-1980
- Spouse: Alix de Saussure (m. 1944)
- Children: 7, including Roger

Philippe de Weck (French pronunciation: [fɪˈlip də vɛk]; 2 January 1919 - 11 December 2009) was a Swiss banker and banking executive. Most notably he was the president of the Swiss Bank Corporation (predecessor of UBS) from 1976 to 1980. He was also a board member of Nestlé, Sulzer, BBC and Oerlikon-Bührle.

== Early life and education ==
De Weck was born 2 January 1919 in Fribourg, Switzerland to Pierre de Weck (1888-1973), a state attorney, and Lucie de Weck (née Glasson). He was a grandson of private banker and mayor of Fribourg Ernest de Weck. He was a member of the Fribourg patriciate De Weck family. He completed his Maturité at Collège Saint-Michel and graduated with a licentiate degree in law from University of Fribourg.

== Career ==
In 1945, de Weck entered the law practice of Jean Bourgknecht, as an associate attorney before ultimately entering the family-owned bank, Weck Aeby, which was founded in 1867. After the bank merged with Swiss Bank Corporation in 1953 he led the Fribourg office until 1956 when transferring to Geneva. In 1964, he was promoted to Vice President at the Zurich headquarters. Between 1976 and 1980 he served as president of the Swiss Bank Corporation, followed by a regular seat on the board of directors until 1988. Additionally he held several notable board of directors memberships.

== Personal life ==
In 1944, de Weck married Alix de Saussure (1921-2014), and they had seven children including Roger de Weck, former president of Swiss Radio and Television.

== Literature ==
- Fidelius Schmid: Gottes schwarze Kasse. Der Papst und die zwielichtigen Geschäfte der Vatikanbank. Eichborn, Köln 2013, ISBN 978-3-8479-0541-7 (in German)
- Johannes Großmann: Die Internationale der Konservativen. Oldenbourg, München 2014, ISBN 978-3-486-76507-6 (in German)
