= Leiding (surname) =

Leiding is a surname. Notable people with the surname include:

- Harriette Kershaw Leiding (1874–1948), American writer
- Jeff Leiding (1961–2014), American football player
- Rudolf Leiding (1914–2003), German Volkswagen executive

== See also ==
- Leiding Township, St. Louis County, Minnesota
