= Bluffton Movement =

United States anti-tariff political movement

The Bluffton Movement was spawned during a political rally held under the "Secession Oak" in the village of Bluffton, South Carolina, on July 31, 1844. The movement was an attempt to invoke "separate state action" against the Tariff of 1842 after John Calhoun's failure to secure the presidential nomination and the Northern Democrats' abandonment of the South on the tariff had apparently destroyed hope for relief within the Democratic Party. Many of the "Blufftonites" undoubtedly contemplated disunion, but the object of their leader, Robert Barnwell Rhett, seems rather to have been a "reform" of the Union giving further safeguards to southern interests. The movement collapsed within a short time, largely through its repudiation by Calhoun.

== Background ==
The impetus for the movement was the passing in Congress of the Tariff of 1842, a protectionist tariff that enraged southern planters. The tariff raised the amount of dutiable goods as well as the rate of taxation on all goods, and it resulted in a sharp decrease in international trade. That was beneficial to northern industrialists, who no longer had to worry about competition from overseas, but greatly hurt southern planters, who relied on international markets for their products. The inequity of the tariff, in direct contrast to the Compromise of 1833, which lowered the protectionist tariffs for the South, caused massive opposition.

A second and equally-important motivation for the movement was the debate over the Annexation of Texas. Southerners were adamant for Texas to be admitted as a slave state, but many northerners opposed the admission of any more slave states. Southerners feared that slavery would be doomed and that Texas would join the British Empire if it was not annexed.

Both outcomes were unacceptable to southerners. They agreed that action needed to be taken, but politicians in South Carolina, the most radical state, squabbled over which action would be most effective. The influential South Carolina Senator John C. Calhoun had hoped to gain a presidential nomination from the Democratic Party on the principles of annexation of Texas and nullification of the Tariff of 1842 without compromise. Calhoun strongly opposed both the tariff and the abolition of slavery, but he also was against separate state action and insisted that Southern states must act together. He lost the nomination to James K. Polk.

Some southerners and South Carolinians rejoiced that Polk was the answer to their problems, but many were not so optimistic. A group, known as the "regency" or the "clique," was led by Rhett and called for immediate state action and gained followers. The movement came to a head in Bluffton, when several hundred prominent young planters and followers of Rhett gathered under a large oak tree, which came to be known as the "secession oak". Rhett declared that there was no hope for the South and that nothing would be gained by Polk being elected. He proclaimed that the only hope was for immediate nullification of the tariff or the secession of South Carolina. He insisted that once it had taken action, other states would follow, and he called for a state convention as soon as the next Congress was finished to resolve the issues. To conclude his revolutionary speech, Rhett raised his glass and said, "May it be as useful as the convention of 1776."

== Spread ==
Immediately following the speech under the oak tree, the Bluffton Boys had some momentum. Many South Carolinians supported Rhett and were not content to sit back and hope for Polk to answer their prayers. A Rhett-sponsored South Carolina newspaper, the Charleston Mercury, urged readers to take action against the "two enormous villainies" (abolitionism and the tariff). It denounced them as "cohesive, cooperative, concurrent, kindred and co-essential atrocities" and implored that unless action was taken, the South would lose everything. Many in South Carolina reluctantly agreed with Rhett, and several anti-tariff associations were formed, which wanted to consider more moderate courses of action first but feared that separate state action might very well be the only way to secure what they saw as their basic rights.

== Aftermath ==
Rhett proclaimed that he was still a friend of Calhoun and would continue to work for the Southern Democrats to ensure the election of Polk. Many suspected his ambition to rally supporters and ultimately to supplant Calhoun. His movement lost momentum when it was denounced by Calhoun, and on August 19, 1844, a convention of Charleston Democrats was held to hold the movement in check. They were embarrassed and concerned by the radical actions of Rhett and feared that the movement would endanger the election of Polk, which Democrats still considered essential. Resolutions were made that affirmed the full support of Polk, denied any disunity in the state, and declared that the state was not ready for separate state action. That stymied the momentum of the Bluffton Movement, which, by October 1, had been over. The movement itself was short-lived, but it raised the issue of secession and was the beginning of an attitude that ultimately led to secession and to the American Civil War.

== Sources ==
1. Jeff Fulgham, The Bluffton Expedition: The Burning of Bluffton, South Carolina, During the Civil War (Bluffton, S.C.: Jeff Fulgham, 2012), 7.

2. Adams, James Truslow (1940). Dictionary of American History. New York: Charles Scribner's Sons.

3. Boucher, Chauncey S. (1919). "The Annexation of Texas and the Bluffton Movement in South Carolina". The Mississippi Valley Historical Review. 6 (1): 3–33. doi:10.2307/1886651. ISSN 0161-391X. JSTOR 1886651.

4. “The Bluffton Movement vs. The Cooperationist Party”, The Southern Nationalist Network, https://web.archive.org/web/20130411062749/http://southernnationalist.com/blog/2013/03/13/the-bluffton-movement-vs-the-cooperationist-party/

5. “A Stately Live Oak Becomes Center Stage for the Bluffton Movement,” Bluffton Breeze Arts, https://web.archive.org/web/20101019084413/http://blufftonbreeze.com/201007/_Bluffton-Special.php
