= John Huger =

American politician

6th Mayor of Charleston
- In office 1792–1794
- Preceded by: Arnoldus Vander Horst
- Succeeded by: John Bee Holmes

John Huger was the sixth intendent (mayor) of Charleston, South Carolina, serving two terms from 1792 to 1794. He laid the cornerstone of the Charleston Orphan House, one of the city's most notable buildings, on November 12, 1792. Before the Revolutionary War, he had been a member of the Commons House of Assembly and a member of the Council of Safety, the group that organized revolutionary movements in Charleston. The location of Huger's estate, Hagan Plantation, was included in an almost 5,000 acre conservation easement.

Preceded by Arnoldus Vander Horst	Mayor of Charleston, South Carolina; 1792–1794	Succeeded by John Bee Holmes
