= John Edwards (Charleston politician) =

Mayor of Charleston, South Carolina, US

8th Mayor of Charleston
- In office 1795–97
- Preceded by: John Bee Holmes
- Succeeded by: Henry William de Saussure

Personal details
- Born: 1760
- Died: December 31, 1798 (aged 38)
- Spouse: Rebecca Donnom
- Profession: Merchant

John Edwards (1760–1798) was the eighth intendant (mayor) of Charleston, South Carolina, serving two terms from 1795 to 1797.

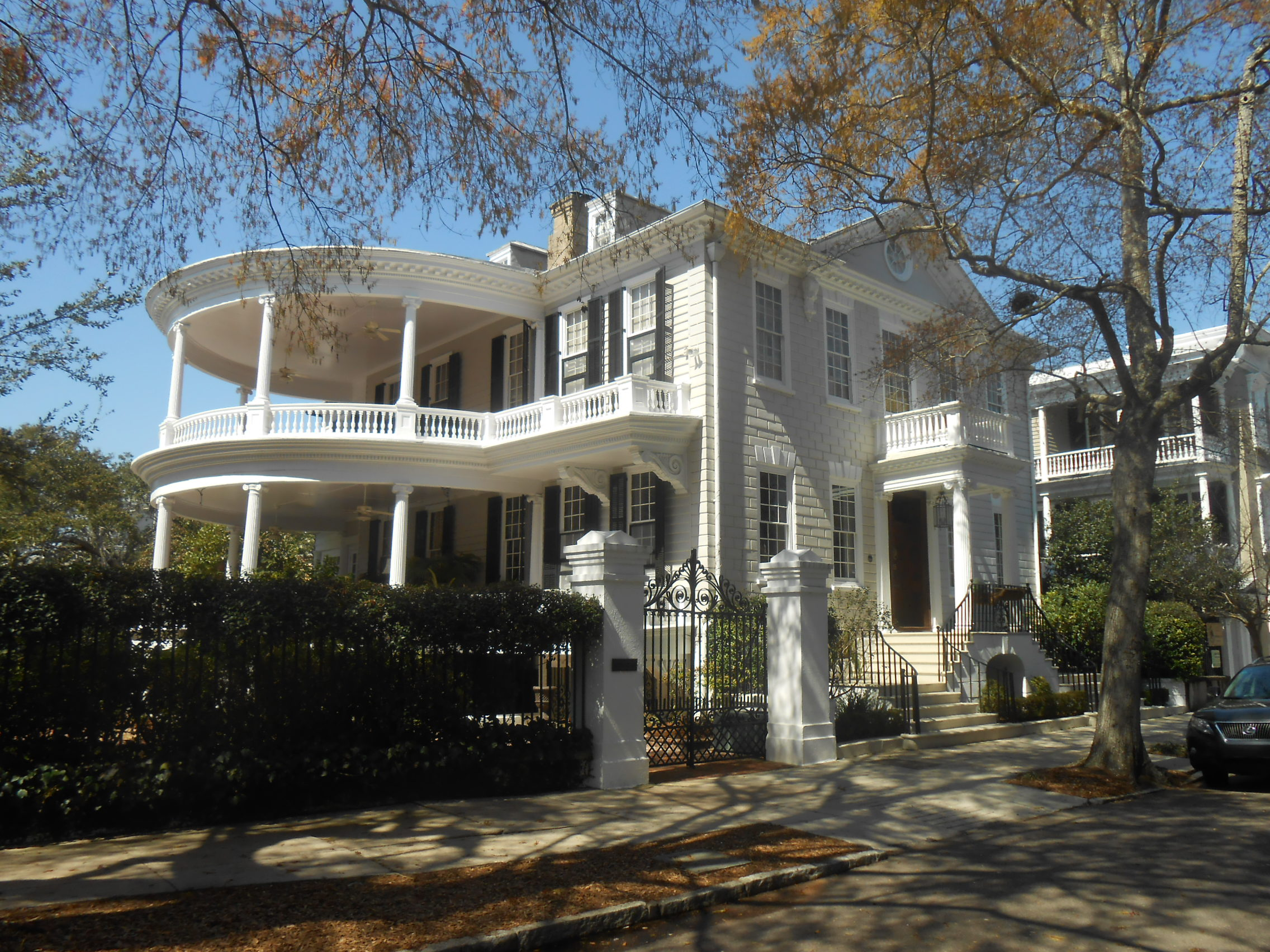
While serving at intendant of Charleston, John Edwards lived at 15 Meeting Street, in a house built for his father in about 1770.

Edwards was born in 1760 to John Edwards and Margaret Peronneau. He served as an aide-de-camp to Francis Marion during the Revolutionary War and married Rebecca Donnom in 1783. Edwards was elected from the Charleston area to the General Assembly for 1787–1788, but he resigned his position when he was appointed Commissioner of the South Carolina Treasury. For 1791 to 1794, he was again elected to the General Assembly. Edwards was elected intendant September 26, 1795, and was re-elected September 12, 1796. After his tenure as mayor, Edwards returned to the Statehouse and served in the South Carolina Senate in 1799 to 1801. He died on December 31, 1798.

Preceded by John Bee Holmes	Mayor of Charleston, South Carolina; 1795–1797	Succeeded by Henry William de Saussure
