= Rhett House Inn =

Historic Inn in South Carolina, U.S.

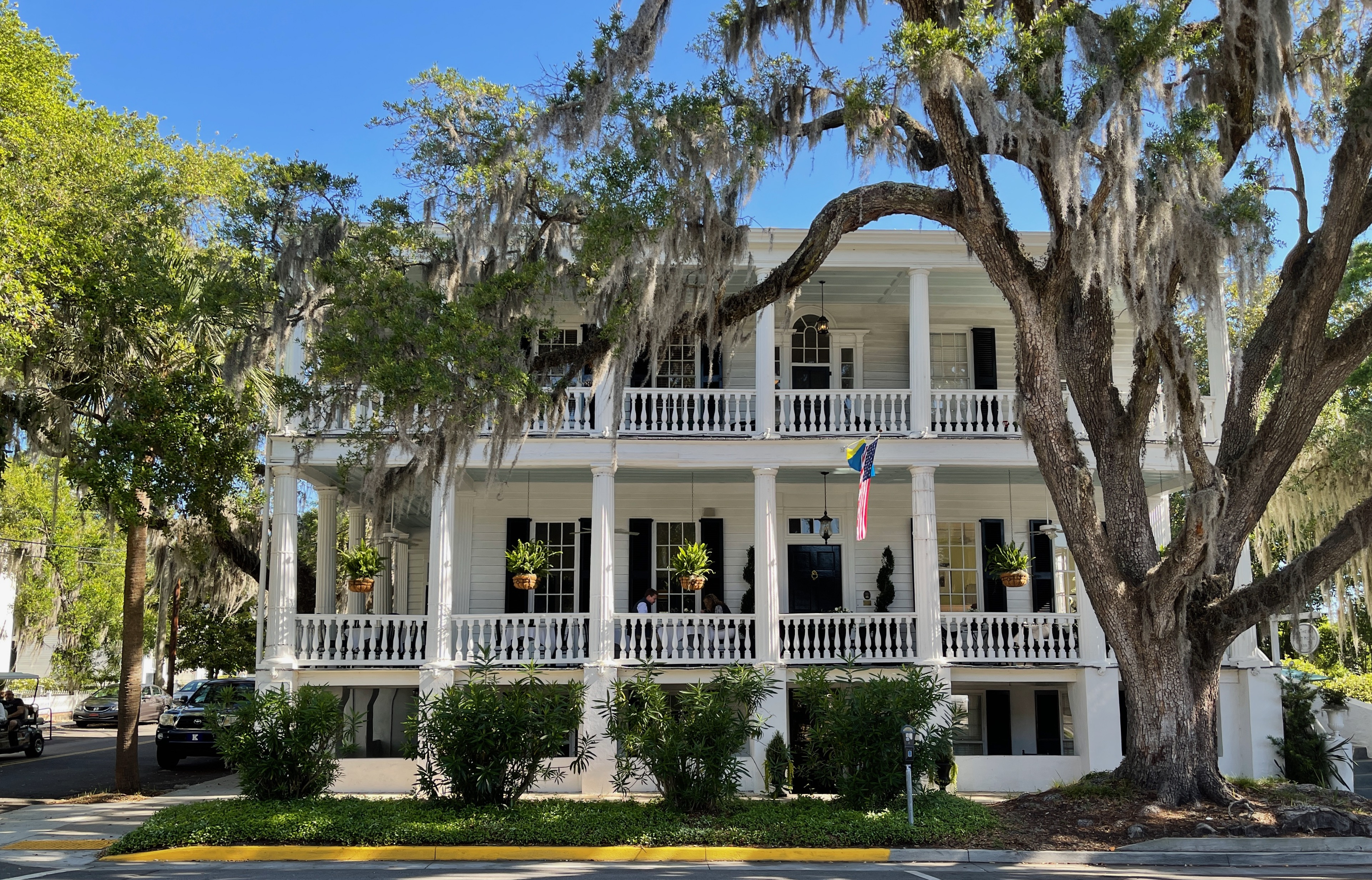
- The Rhett House Inn
- Interactive map of the Rhett House Inn area
- Alternative names: Thomas Moore Rhett House

General information
- Architectural style: Greek Revival; Federal
- Location: 1009 Craven Street, Beaufort, South Carolina, U.S.
- Coordinates: 32°25′59″N 80°40′24″W
- Groundbreaking: ca. 1820

Technical details
- Floor count: 2
- Floor area: 6,000 square feet (560 m^{2})

Other information
- Number of rooms: 17

The Rhett House Inn, is historic building in Beaufort, South Carolina. It is significant as the home of Thomas Moore Rhett and his wife, Caroline Barnwell, who were early pioneers in South Carolina in the 1800s. The Inn is in the Point neighborhood, which is part of the Beaufort Historic District.

== History ==
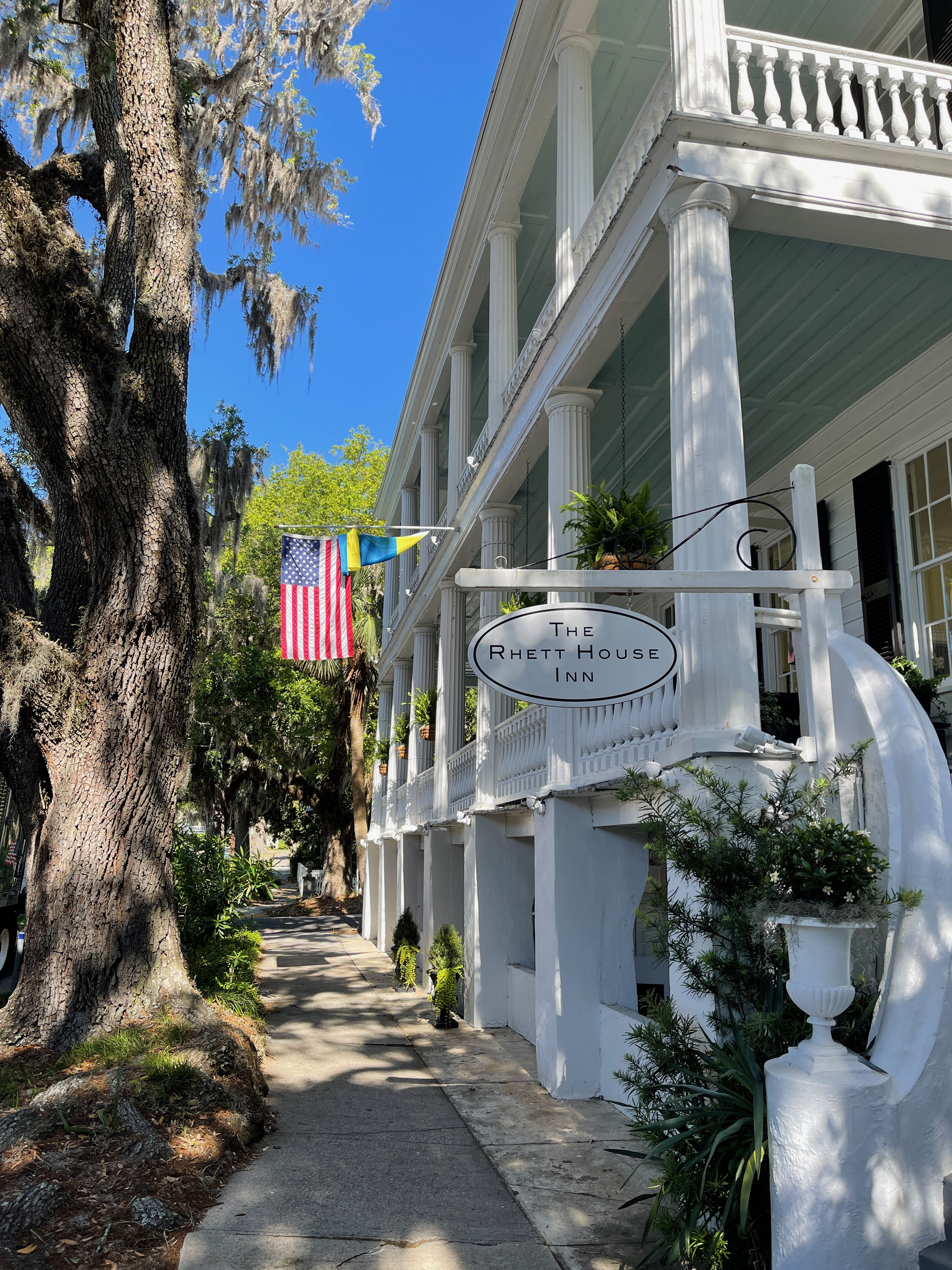
Side view of the Rhett House Inn

Construction records date the house to ca. 1820. Thomas Moore Rhett and his wife, Caroline Barnwell, owned the two-story, 6,000 square feet (560 m^{2})Federal and Greek Revival style mansion up to the American Civil War. The building, which initially had eight rooms, served as a summer home. Rhett owned a plantation on the Ashepoo River with enslaved African Americans living and working on the property. In 1850, Rhett advertised in The Charleston Mercury giving a fifty dollar reward for the apprehension and delivery to the nearest jail of a slave named Sampson. Rhett died on December 26, 1860.

The Inn sits on a masonry basement with a porch on the south and west sides and faces the Beaufort River. Greek Doric columns support the upper and lower porches. After the Civil War, the Thomas Rhett House was a hospital for injured soldiers. Changes to the house were made in the late 1800s. From the 1900s until the mid-1930s, the Thomas Rhett house was a private home. At the end of the 1930s, the Tucker family bought the house, and it was known as The Tucker Inn. Jane Ridings, the eldest daughter of the Tuckers, bought the Inn from her parents and changed the name to Cherokee Inn. In the 1950s, she sold the inn to Best Western, which sold it to Alcoa South Carolina, a subsidiary of Alcoa, to be used as corporate offices during the development of the Dataw Island Resort.

Steve and Marianne Harrison bought the inn after a vacation in the area in 1986. The couple then renovated the building. It has been used as a hotel since 1986.

== See also ==
- Beaufort Historic District (Beaufort, South Carolina)
- Robert Barnwell Rhett House
- Col. William Rhett House
