= Alicia Rhett =

American actress and painter (1915–2014)

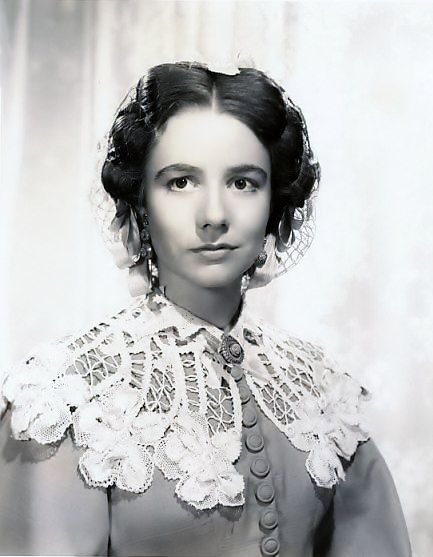
- Rhett in Gone with the Wind (1939)
- Born: February 1, 1915; Savannah, Georgia, U.S.
- Died: January 3, 2014 (aged 98); Charleston, South Carolina, U.S.
- Occupations: Actress, portrait painter
- Years active: 1937–1941
- Relatives: Robert Barnwell Rhett (great-grandfather)

Mary Alicia Rhett (February 1, 1915 – January 3, 2014) was an American actress and portrait painter who is best remembered for her role as India Wilkes in the 1939 epic film Gone with the Wind. At the time of her death, Rhett was one of the oldest surviving credited cast members of the movie.

== Early life ==
Rhett was born on February 1, 1915 in Savannah, Georgia, to Isobel Murdoch, an immigrant from Liverpool, England, and Edmund M. Rhett, an American army officer and engineer based in Savannah. Her grandfather was Col. Alfred Moore Rhett, the commander of the 1st South Carolina Artillery for most of the civil war, and her great-grandfather was Sen. Robert Barnwell Rhett, Alfred Rhett's father. After her father's death during World War I, Alicia and her mother moved to Charleston, South Carolina. Rhett became a theatre actress in Charleston. A newspaper article in 1939 quoted a Selznick International Pictures news release as saying that Rhett Butler's first name was chosen by Margaret Mitchell because "Since earliest Colonial days, the Rhett family has occupied a prominent position in the South generally, and, more particularly, in and around Charleston, S.C."

Alicia Rhett graduated from Memminger High School in Charleston.

== Gone with the Wind ==
During a performance of The Recruiting Officer in 1936, Rhett was spotted by Hollywood director George Cukor, who was impressed by her charm and beauty. The director was scouting for an actress to play the role of Scarlett O'Hara after producer David Selznick purchased the film rights to the Margaret Mitchell novel. Previously, she had been suggested by talent scout Kay Brown as a possible Southern belle for the film.

Rhett auditioned for the part of Melanie Hamilton, but the role went instead to Olivia de Havilland. In March 1937, Cukor offered Rhett the role of India Wilkes, sister of Ashley Wilkes. After the success of Gone with the Wind, Rhett left Hollywood and returned to South Carolina and retired from filmmaking in 1941, citing a lack of suitable roles. Rhett later became an accent coach for aspiring actors and a radio announcer at station WTMA in Charleston.

== Portrait painter ==
Prior to appearing in Gone with the Wind, Rhett showed talent as a sketch artist and portrait painter. Between takes on Gone with the Wind, she made sketches and drawings of her fellow actors. Soon, Rhett was creating portraits of American servicemen in the Charleston vicinity.

== Death ==
Rhett died at age 98, of natural causes, on January 3, 2014, at Bishop Gadsden Episcopal Retirement Community in her longtime hometown of Charleston, South Carolina. In her obituaries, Rhett was cited as having been "the oldest living actor from Gone With the Wind", being 17 months older than Dame Olivia de Havilland.

== Filmography ==
Year	Title	Role	Notes
1939	Gone with the Wind	India Wilkes	
