= John Bee Holmes =

American politician

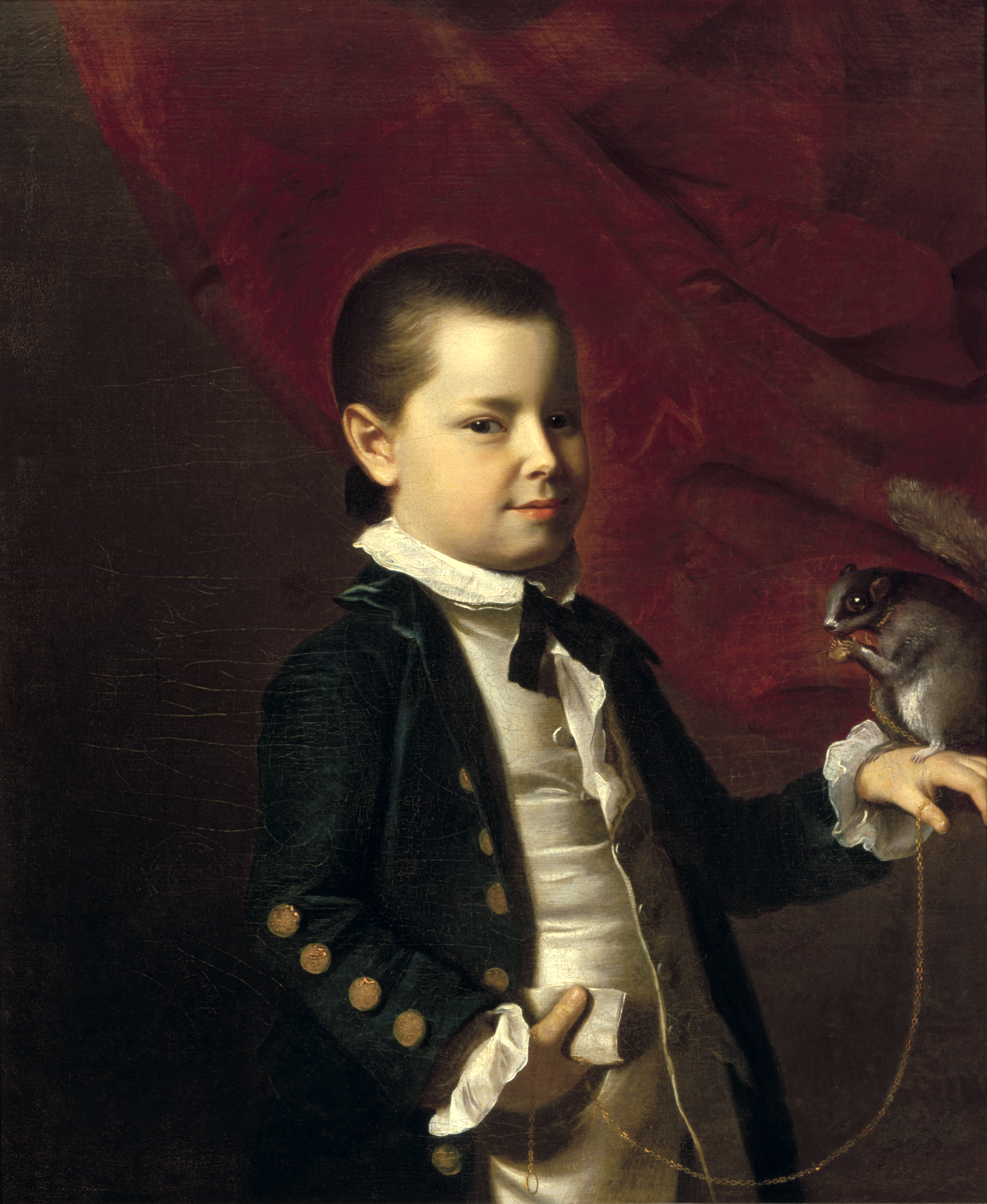
- Portrait by John Singleton Copley, c. 1765

7th Mayor of Charleston
- In office 1794–1795
- Preceded by: John Huger
- Succeeded by: John Edwards

Personal details
- Born: 1760
- Died: September 5, 1827 (aged 66–67)
- Spouse: Elizabeth Edwards
- Profession: Lawyer

John Bee Holmes (1760 — September 5, 1827) was the seventh intendant of Charleston, South Carolina, serving one term between 1794 and 1795.

Holmes born in about 1760 to Isaac Holmes and Rebecca Bee. During the Revolutionary War, he was the aide-de-camp to General John Barnwell. He married Elizabeth Edwards in 1783 and was admitted to practice law the same year. He owned Washington Plantation on the Cooper River in St. John's Parish (Berkeley County).

Holmes was elected intendant in September 1794. He resigned in September 1795 and was followed in office by his brother-in-law, John Edwards. He also held state office, representing the Charleston area in the General Assembly of South Carolina from 1791 to 1797. He served in the South Carolina Senate from 1799 to 1801.

He died on September 5, 1827.

Political offices
Preceded by John Huger	Mayor of Charleston, South Carolina; 1794–1795	Succeeded by John Edwards
