= Saulxures-lès-Nancy =

- Commune
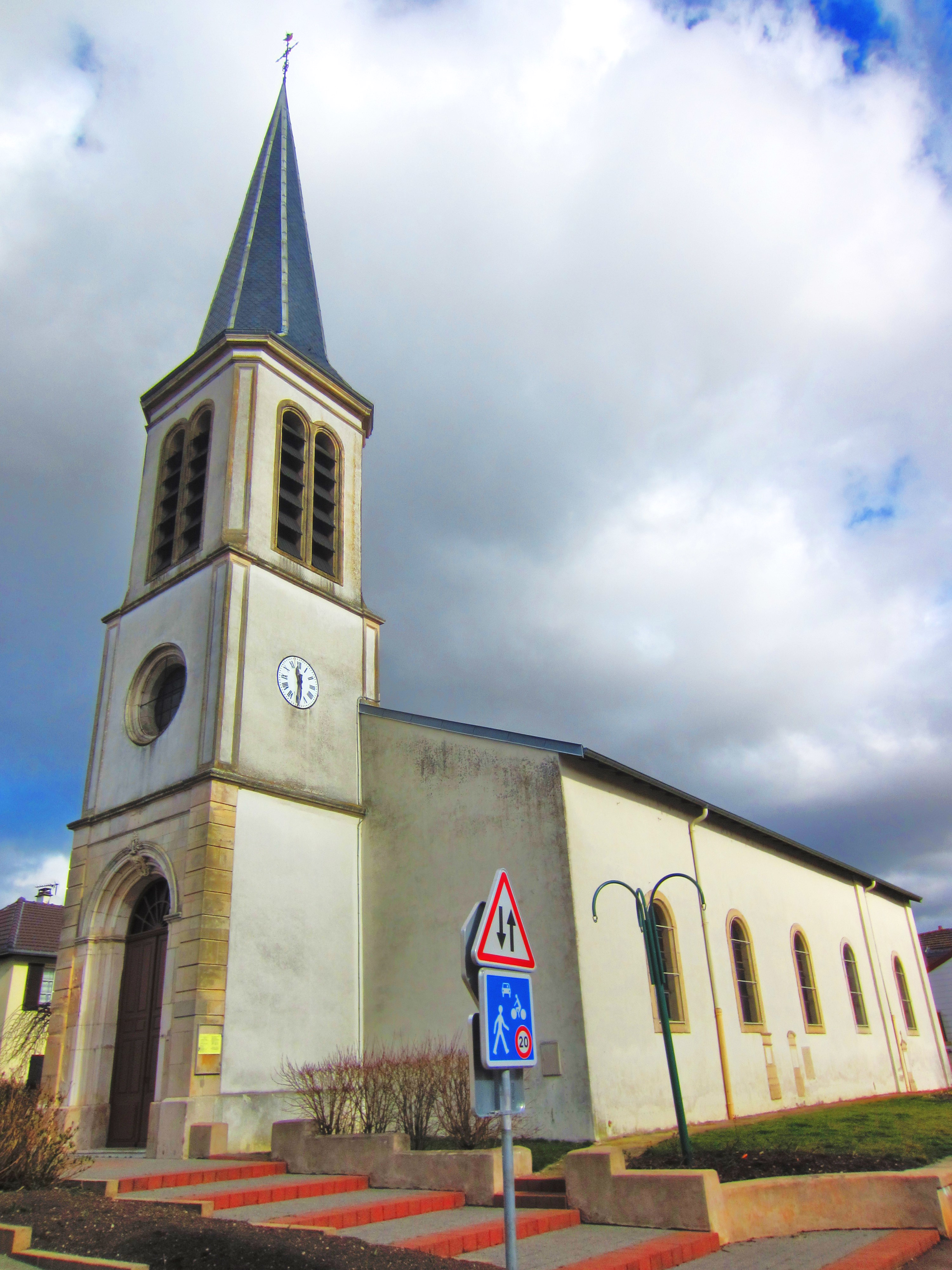
- The church in Saulxures-lès-Nancy

- Coat of arms
- Location of Saulxures-lès-Nancy
- Location within France Location within Grand Est
- Coordinates: 48°41′23″N 6°14′52″E
- Country: France
- Region: Grand Est
- Department: Meurthe-et-Moselle
- Arrondissement: Nancy
- Canton: Grand Couronné
- Intercommunality: Métropole du Grand Nancy

Government
  - Mayor (2020–2026): Bernard Girsch
- Area^{1}: 7.05 km^{2} (2.72 sq mi)
- Elevation: 222 m (728 ft)
- Highest elevation: 305 m (1,001 ft)
- Lowest elevation: 206 m (676 ft)
- Population (2023): 4,344
  - Density: 616/km^{2} (1,600/sq mi)
- Time zone: UTC+01:00 (CET)
  - Summer (DST): UTC+02:00 (CEST)
- INSEE/Postal code: 54495 /54420
- ^{1} French Land Register data, which excludes lakes, ponds, glaciers > 1 km^{2} (0.386 sq mi or 247 acres) and river estuaries.

Saulxures-lès-Nancy (French pronunciation: [solsyʁ lɛ nɑ̃si], literally Saulxures near Nancy) is a commune in the Meurthe-et-Moselle department in north-eastern France, located 6 km (3.7 mi) east of Nancy.

The commune covers an area of 7.05 km^{2} (2.72 sq mi). Bernard Girsch is the mayor for the 2020-2026 tenure.

The Château de Saulxures de Nancy dates from the reign of Louis XV, and was built c1730 by Count Claude-Marcel de Rutant, an ally of the Duke of Lorraine.

The parish church of St Martin dates from the 18th century and was extended in the 1840s. The village has a primary school named after the author Maurice Barrès.

== Population ==
Historical population
Year	Pop.	±% p.a.
1968	1,520	—
1975	3,251	+11.47%
1982	3,932	+2.75%
1990	4,124	+0.60%
1999	4,042	−0.22%
2007	3,917	−0.39%
2012	3,951	+0.17%
2017	4,120	+0.84%
2023	4,344	+0.89%
Source: INSEE

== See also ==
- Communes of the Meurthe-et-Moselle department
