= Alfred M. Rhett =

Confederate officer (1829–1889)

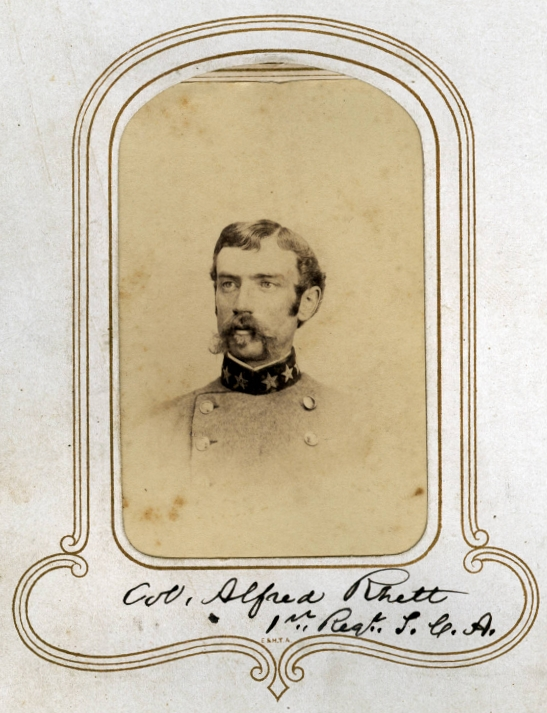
Rhett in military uniform

Alfred Moore Rhett (October 18, 1829 – November 12, 1889) was a rice planter, a "volatile and controversial" Confederate artillery officer, victorious duelist, police chief, and the son of Fire-Eater Southern politician Robert Barnwell Rhett.

== Biography ==
Rhett was educated at Harvard, class of 1850; in a letter to another son in 1847, Robert Rhett complained that Alfred "had spent excessively on clothing and had exhausted his allowance for the year."

Upon graduation, Rhett became a rice planter in South Carolina. During the American Civil War he killed a West Point-educated relative of John C. Calhoun, William Ransom Calhoun, his commanding officer at the Charleston harbor fortifications, in a duel on September 5, 1862. John C. Calhoun had been his father's friend and political ally in Congress. The younger Calhoun's friends denounced Rhett in "unmeasured terms." Rhett was later "promoted to the office which his own good right hand had made vacant." According to the U.S. National Park Service, "At the end of June 1863, Fort Sumter was garrisoned with 5 companies (perhaps 500 men) of the 1st South Carolina Artillery, under the command of Col. Alfred Rhett. Its armament, meanwhile, had been reduced to 68 guns and mortars, many of the finest pieces having been removed to strengthen other fortifications about the harbor."

Later in the war Rhett was taken prisoner. Captive Rhett was delivered to William T. Sherman on a rainy day when the Union Army had set up a command post in an old cooper's shop. Sherman described him as "a tall, slender, and handsome young man, dressed in the most approved rebel uniform, with high jackboots beautifully stitched, and...dreadfully mortified to find himself a prisoner in our hands." Rhett was invited to dine with Sherman and Frank Blair, and spoke freely throughout the meal. Henry Hitchcock described Rhett (who had been captured by scouts inside his own skirmish line, and whose interrogation Hitchcock observed) as a gentlemanly villain and "incarnate selfishness." Hitchcock was particularly astounded by Rhett confidently telling Sherman that he could easily raise 100,000 men in a month:

Conscripts are just as good as any other soldiers; discipline's the thing; all you have to do is to establish the principle. Why, I've shot twelve men myself in the last six weeks and not long ago Ι took a pack of dogs and went into the swamps and in three days I caught twenty-eight men with them.' I have given you almost the exact, literal words he used. This 'chivalrous' Southern gentleman, this devil in human shape, who is but a type of his class, and whose polished manners and easy assurance made only more hideous to me the utterly heartless and selfish ambition and pride of class which gave tone to his whole discourse. Day after day we had been listening to the protestations of those whose own ignorance and cowardice have made them the victims, while also in some sense the accomplices, of these 'leaders'; day after day we heard the same story in South Carolina just as regularly as in Georgia and in a more whining style.

A Confederate deserter later told Union officers that Rhett had been lucky to be captured as he had killed at least seven Confederate soldiers since leaving Fort Sumter, including one who served under Joseph Wheeler, and multiple people wanted him dead. As a POW, Rhett was alleged to have demanded that Gen. Schofield "meet him on the field of honor," but as duels were only a habit of Confederate officers, nothing came of it.

Rhett later served as the chief of municipal police in Charleston, as South Carolina state constable, and as a trial judge and/or justice of the peace. According to an Anderson, S.C. newspaper, "In an election held here in 1878 he quelled a mob of over 500 infuriated negroes. He was his own enemy. Death resulted from a congestive chill, resulting from malaria, acquired last summer while planting rice in the country." An Orangeburg newspaper remembered him as a "gallant defender of the Lost Cause."

His brother R. Barnwell Rhett Jr. was editor of the New Orleans Times-Picayune. Ex-Confederate general Roswell Ripley was Rhett's wife's stepfather.

== See also ==
- List of Confederate duels
- Sallie Rhett Roman, Alfred's sister
