= De Weck =

Prominent family of Fribourg, Switzerland

The family of de Weck (until 1782 Weck) of Fribourg features prominently in the political and military history of Switzerland. Since the 15th century, de Wecks have served in all leading political offices of the country except that of Federal Councillor.

== History ==
The family was founded in the 14th century by the messenger Pierre du Borjat, called Cugnyet, who became a citizen of Fribourg in 1507 and Germanized his name to Weck. By the 1520s, the Wecks were numerously represented in the city's governing bodies. Many served in the armies of France and of other European countries. A Protestant Bernese branch became extinct in the 17th century. In 1782, the Wecks obtained the right to use the nobiliary particle, de, underlining their position as part of Fribourg's patriciate.

In the 19th and 20th century, de Wecks occupied senior positions in government, the military and other public positions, including six times the office of Councillor of State (member of the cantonal government) of Fribourg. The family built and still owns several mansions. Many de Wecks now work in the legal profession.

== Notable de Wecks ==
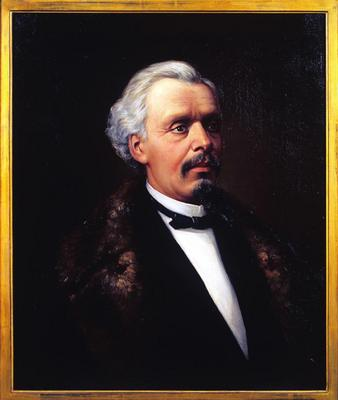
Louis de Weck (1823–1880)

- Rudolf Weck (1582/83–1655), soldier, politician and diplomat
- Dominique Weck (1666–1731), Jesuit priest and professor of philosophy
- Niklaus Weck (1729–1801), general and politician
- Rodolphe de Weck (1784–1858), Councillor of State
- Louis de Weck-Reynold (1823–1880), Councillor of State
- Rodolphe de Weck-Bussy (1826–1861), Councillor of State
- Charles de Weck (1837–1931), Councillor of State
- Ernest de Weck (1860–1919), mayor of Fribourg, member of the Council of States
- Louis de Weck (1867–1916), Councillor of State
- Antoinette de Weck-de Boccard (1868–1956), painter and illustrator
- Eugène de Weck (1872–1912), painter
- René de Weck (1887–1950), Swiss ambassador to Romania
- Bernard de Weck (1890–1950), Councillor of State, member of the Council of States
- Edmond de Weck (1901–1977), footballer, member of the Swiss national team
- Philippe de Weck (1919–2009), CEO and president of UBS
- Alain de Weck (1928–2013), Professor of Immunology and Allergy at the University of Berne
- Roger de Weck (b. 1953), Director-General of the Swiss Broadcasting Corporation
- Olivier de Weck (b. 1968), Professor of Aeronautics and Astronautics and Engineering Systems at MIT
- Olivia de Weck, vice president of the gun rights advocacy group ProTell
