= Robert Barnwell Rhett =

American politician (1800–1876)

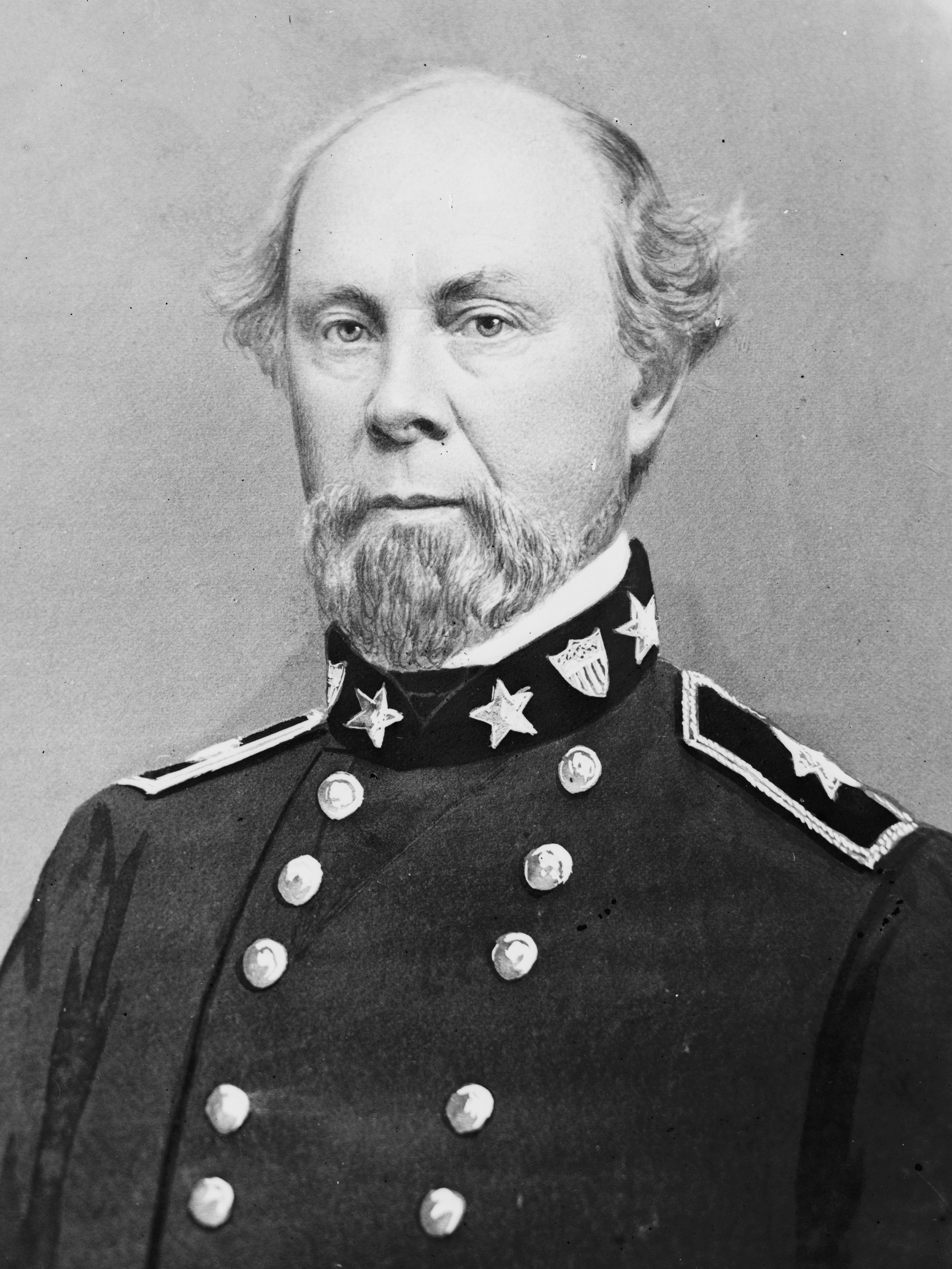

Deputy to the Provisional C.S. Congress from South Carolina
- In office February 4, 1861 – February 18, 1862
- Preceded by: Position established
- Succeeded by: Position abolished

United States Senator from South Carolina
- In office December 18, 1850 – May 7, 1852
- Preceded by: Franklin H. Elmore
- Succeeded by: William de Saussure

Member of the U.S. House of Representatives from South Carolina
- In office March 4, 1837 – March 3, 1849
- Preceded by: William Grayson
- Succeeded by: William Colcock
- Constituency: 2nd district (1837–43); 7th district (1843–49)

8th Attorney General of South Carolina
- In office November 29, 1832 – March 4, 1837
- Governor: Robert Hayne; George McDuffie; Pierce Butler
- Preceded by: Hugh S. Legaré
- Succeeded by: Henry Bailey

Member of the South Carolina House of Representatives from St. Bartholomew's Parish
- In office November 27, 1826 – November 29, 1832

Personal details
- Born: Robert Barnwell Smith; December 21, 1800 Beaufort, South Carolina
- Died: September 14, 1876 (aged 75) St. James Parish, Louisiana
- Resting place: Magnolia Cemetery, Charleston, South Carolina
- Party: Democratic
- Other political affiliations: Southern National Party
- Relations: R. Barnwell Rhett Jr. (son), Alfred M. Rhett (son), Sallie Rhett Roman (daughter), Alicia Rhett (great-granddaughter)
- Occupation: Politician, lawyer, planter, and newspaper publisher

Robert Barnwell Rhett (born Robert Barnwell Smith; December 21, 1800 – September 14, 1876) was an American politician who served as a member of the US House of Representatives from South Carolina from 1837 to 1849, a US Senator from South Carolina from 1850 to 1852, and as a deputy from South Carolina to the Provisional Confederate States Congress from 1861 to 1862. As a staunch supporter of slavery and an early advocate of secession, he was a "Fire-Eater", nicknamed the "father of secession".

Rhett published his views through his newspaper, the Charleston Mercury.

His son Alfred M. Rhett commanded a battery at Fort Moultrie at the time of the bombardment of Fort Sumter.

== Early life ==
Rhett was born Robert Barnwell Smith in Beaufort, South Carolina, United States. He later studied law.

On his mother's side, he was related to U.S. Representative Robert Barnwell (his great-uncle) and Senator Robert Woodward Barnwell (son of Robert). A cousin of the Barnwells was the wife of Alexander Garden.

== Early career ==
Rhett was a member of the South Carolina legislature from 1826 until 1832, and was extremely pro-slavery in his views. At the end of the Nullification Crisis in 1833, he told the South Carolina Nullification Convention:

A people, owning slaves, are mad, or worse than mad, who do not hold their destinies in their own hands.

In 1832, Rhett became South Carolina's Attorney General, serving until 1837. He was then elected a US Representative and served until 1849. In 1838, he changed his last name from Smith to that of a prominent colonial ancestor, Colonel William Rhett.

Rhett objected vehemently to the protectionist Tariff of 1842.

== Support for secession ==
On July 31, 1844, Rhett launched the Bluffton Movement, which called for South Carolina to return to nullification or else declare secession. It was soon repudiated by more moderate South Carolina Democrats, including even Senator John C. Calhoun, who feared it would endanger the presidential candidacy of James K. Polk.

Rhett opposed the Compromise of 1850 as against the interests of the slave-holding South. He joined fellow Fire-Eaters at the Nashville Convention of 1850, which failed to endorse his aim of secession for the whole South. After the Nashville Convention, Rhett, William Lowndes Yancey, and a few others met in Macon, Georgia on August 21, 1850, and formed the short-lived Southern National Party.

In December 1850, he was elected by the South Carolina Legislature to complete the U. S. Senate term left by the death of Calhoun, and that of Franklin H. Elmore, who was originally elected to fill the seat, but died shortly after taking office.

Rhett continued to advocate secession in response to the Compromise, but in 1852, South Carolina refrained from declaring secession and merely passed an ordinance declaring a state's right to secede. Disappointed, he resigned his Senate seat, to be replaced by William F. De Saussure.

Rhett continued to express his fiery secessionist sentiments through the Charleston Mercury, now edited by his son, Robert Barnwell Rhett Jr.

The 1860 Democratic National Convention met in Charleston, South Carolina and a large bloc of Southern delegates walked out when the platform was insufficiently pro-slavery. That led to the division of the party and separate Northern and Southern nominees for president, which practically guaranteed the election of an anti-slavery Republican, which in turn triggered declarations of secession in seven states. During the 1860 presidential campaign, a widely credited report in the Nashville Patriot said that the outcome was the intended result of a conspiracy by Rhett, Yancey, and William Porcher Miles hatched at the Southern Convention in Montgomery, Alabama in May 1858. One 20th-century historian called the scheme the work of "Rhett–Yancey–Keitt extremists."

== Confederate States ==
Map of Charleston and its defenses, 1863, including a large riverfront property labelled Rhett

After the election of the Republican Party's candidate, Abraham Lincoln, Rhett was elected to the South Carolina Secession Convention, which declared secession in December. He was chosen as deputy from South Carolina to the Provisional Congress of the Confederate States in Montgomery where he championed the cause of re-opening the Atlantic slave trade, which had been illegal since 1808. He was one of the most active deputies and was the chairman of the committee that reported the Confederate States Constitution. He was then elected to the Confederate House of Representatives. He received no higher office in the Confederate government and returned to South Carolina. During the rest of the Civil War, he sharply criticized the policies of Confederate President Jefferson Davis.

In October 1865, Confederate military officer P.G.T. Beauregard wrote to Rhett encouraging him to resume publication of the Charleston Mercury "to help in re-establishing the truths of History. It will be difficult, even for many of our own people, to believe that so glorious a cause as the one we fought for should have been sacrificed by the prejudices & want of judgment & foresight of one man [Jefferson Davis]! Yet such was the fact, according to my most deliberate opinion."

== Death ==
Rhett struggled with skin cancer for many years, including a "cancerous growth on his nose which terribly disfigured him and also affected his general health in the years after the war." After the war, Rhett settled in Louisiana. He died in St. James Parish, Louisiana, and is interred at Magnolia Cemetery in Charleston, South Carolina.

== Legacy ==
The Robert Barnwell Rhett House in Charleston was declared a National Historic Landmark in 1973.

== See also ==
- List of slave owners
- List of United States representatives from South Carolina
- List of United States senators from South Carolina

Confederate States House of Representatives
Preceded by Position created	Deputy to the Provisional C.S. Congress from South Carolina; 1861–1862	Succeeded by Position abolished
U.S. Senate
Preceded by Robert Barnwell	U.S. senator (Class 2) from South Carolina; 1850–1852; Served alongside: Andrew Butler	Succeeded by William de Saussure
U.S. House of Representatives
Preceded by William Grayson	Member of the U.S. House of Representatives from South Carolina's 2nd congressional district 1837–1843	Succeeded by Richard Simpson
Preceded by James Rogers	Member of the U.S. House of Representatives from South Carolina's 7th congressional district 1843–1849	Succeeded by William Colcock
