= Col. William Rhett House =

Historic house in Charleston, South Carolina

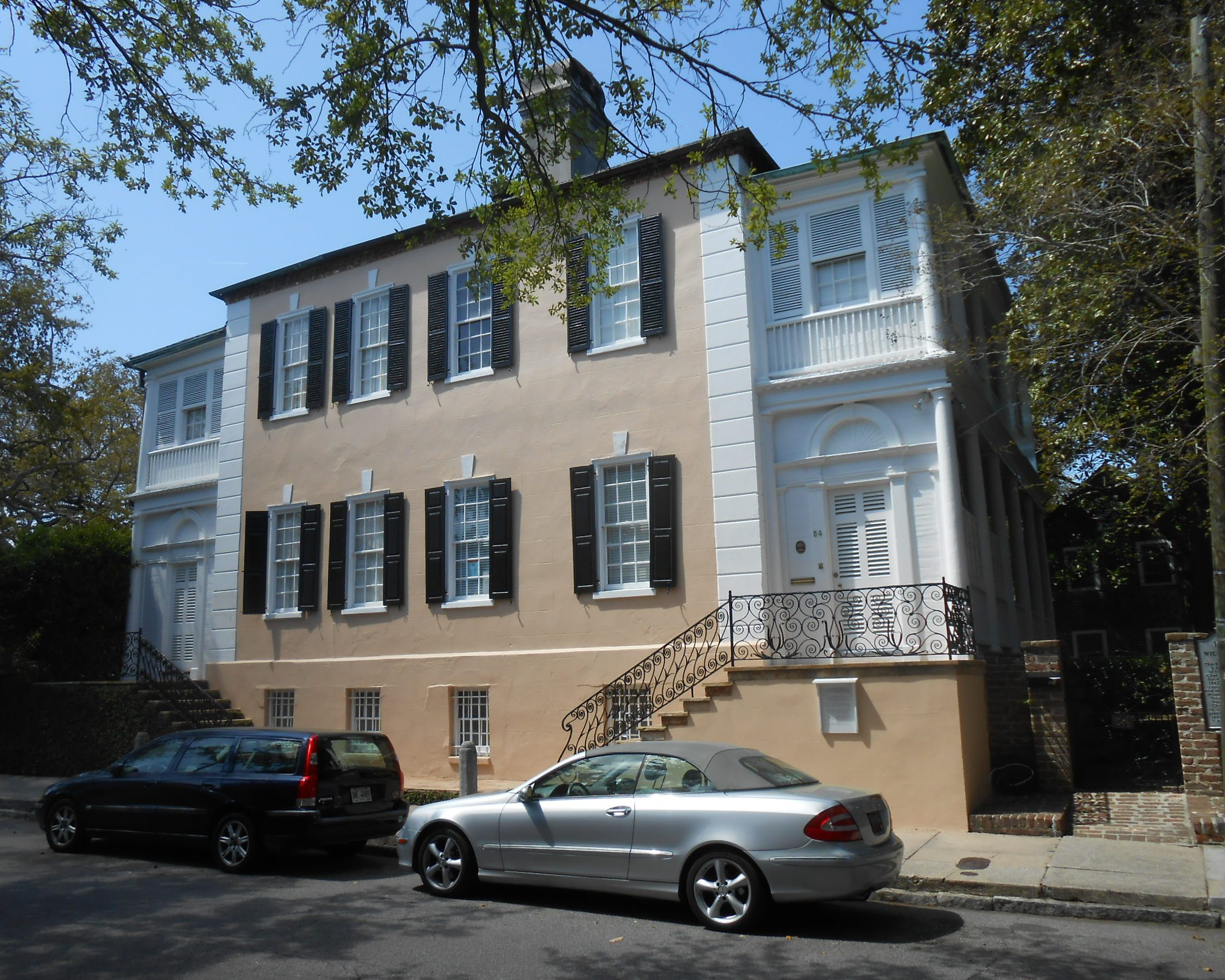
- The Col. William Rhett House is one of the oldest structures in Charleston, South Carolina.
- Interactive map of the Col. William Rhett House area

General information
- Location: 54 Hasell St., Charleston, South Carolina, U.S.
- Coordinates: 32°46′54″N 79°56′4″W
- Groundbreaking: 1712

The Col. William Rhett House is a historic, stuccoed brick two-story home at 54 Hasell St., Charleston, South Carolina. A historical marker was erected at the house in 2001 by the Preservation Society of Charleston.

== History ==
The Col. William Rhett House was built in 1712 as the main house for Point Plantation later known as Rhettsbury, lying outside the walled city's limits by Col. William Rhett. The plantation was later folded into the historic Ansonborough neighborhood.

After Rhett's death in 1722, the house remained in his family until 1807 when it was bought by Christopher Fitzsimons. Mr. Fitzsimon's grandson Gov. Wade Hampton was born in the house.

In the 1940s, the house was bought by Mr. and Mrs. Benjamin Kittredge, the creators of Cypress Gardens near Moncks Corner, South Carolina. The Kittredges added the eastern set of stairs to the front of their house to match the original set on the opposite side of the house.

It is still privately owned.

== See also ==
- Rhett House Inn
