= Harriette Kershaw Leiding =

American writer (1874–1948)

- Born: June 26, 1874; Sewanee, Tennessee, U.S.
- Died: March 20, 1948 (aged 73); Charleston, South Carolina, U.S.
- Occupation(s): Writer, gallery director, local historian, clubwoman
- Relatives: Joseph B. Kershaw (grandfather); Wilmot Gibbes de Saussure (grandfather)

Harriette Dubose Kershaw Leiding (June 26, 1874 – March 20, 1948), known socially as Mrs. H. G. Leiding, was an American writer, clubwoman, and gallery director, based in Charleston, South Carolina. She wrote several local histories, including Street cries of an old southern city; with music and illustrations (1910), Historic Houses of South Carolina (1921), and Charleston, Historic and Romantic (1931). Her photographs are in the Charleston Museum.

== Early life ==
Harriette Kershaw was born in Sewanee, Tennessee, and raised in Camden and Sumter, South Carolina, the daughter of Rev. John Kershaw and Susan B. de Saussure Kershaw of the De Saussure family. Her paternal grandfather, Joseph B. Kershaw, was a major general in the Confederate States Army during the American Civil War, and later a politician. Her maternal grandfather, Wilmot Gibbes de Saussure, was also a Confederate general and a politician. She graduated from the Peabody College for Teachers in 1894.

== Career ==
Leiding wrote four books of local history and folklore about Charleston, emphasizing a romantic, nostalgic view of the Southern city. She also wrote shorter essays, and the lyrics to a 1913 song, "Calling to Thee", with music by Eugene Wyatt.

Readable pdf of Historic Houses of South Carolina

Leiding was director of Gibbes Art Gallery. She donated "extraordinarily" large stone crab claws to the Charleston Museum, which also holds a collection of her photographs. She was a member of the South Carolina Historical and Genealogical Society.

In 1915, she was local chair of the Southern Commercial Congress, when it met in Charleston, and she was active in the Woman's Committee Council of Defense during World War I, the Charleston Civic Club, the State Federation of Women's Clubs, the Art Association of South Carolina, and many other organizations. "She has been with all the big civic movements inaugurated in Charleston," noted a 1915 profile. "As a patriotic and civic worker she is earnest, active, and always on the job," according to a 1918 article.

== Publications ==
Readable pdf of Street cries of an old southern city; with music and illustrations (1910)

- Street cries of an old southern city; with music and illustrations (1910)
- "Charleston Gardens" (1914)
- "The Great or Broad Seal of the Confederacy" (1921)
- Historic Houses of South Carolina (1921)
- "Inscriptions from the Church Yard at Wiltown Bluff" (1926)
- Charleston, Historic and Romantic (1931)

== Personal life ==
Kershaw married Charleston businessman Herman Gustavus Leiding. She died in 1948, at the age of 73, at her home in Charleston.

== See also ==
- Alfred Hutty, Charleston artist who illustrated one of her books
- Street cries
