= De Saussure family =

- Patrician family
- Place of origin: Saulxures, Lorraine, France
- Founded: Arrival in Switzerland 1556, Lausanne; 470 years ago; Arrival in United States 1730, Charleston, South Carolina, U.S.; 296 years ago
- Titles: State legislator; General; Colonel

The De Saussure family is a family from the Geneva patriciate of Huguenot origins hailing from Lorraine, France but being settled in Switzerland since 1556. An American branch was established in South Carolina in the 18th century by Henri de Saussure; among his descendants were Chancellor Henry William de Saussure and US Senator William F. De Saussure.

== History ==
The family originally hails from Saulxures in the Lorraine region of France. During their service as falconers to the duke he ennobled them in 1506. Due to religious persecution for being Huguenot they emigrated to Lausanne and Geneva, where they became citizens in 1556 respectively 1636.

== Swiss branch ==
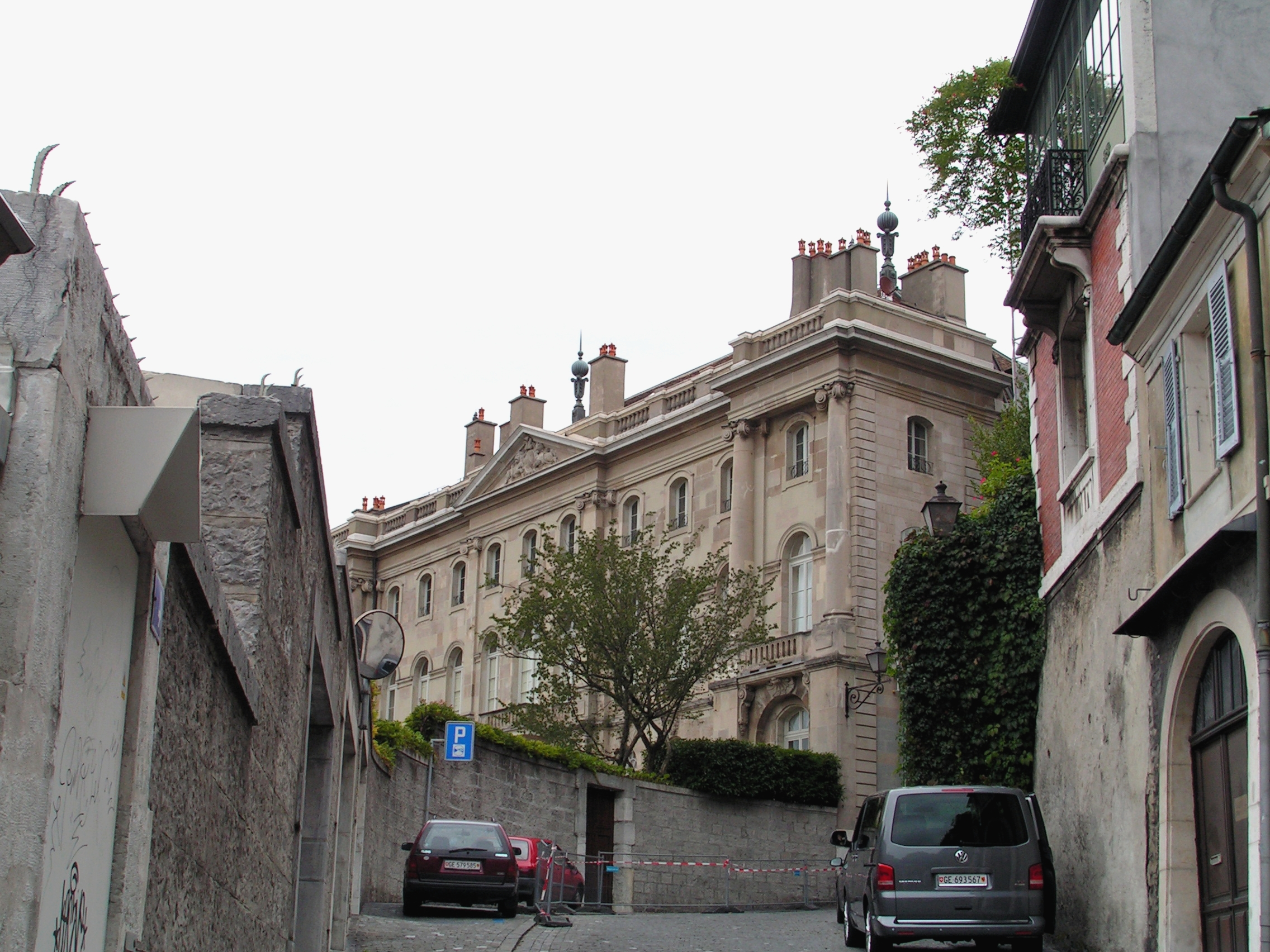
Hôtel particulier of the Saussure family in Geneva

In Switzerland, as well as in the Republic of Geneva, they soon became politically and socio-economically active holding a variety of public offices. Théodore de Saussure became the mayor of Geneva, his son Nicolas de Saussure (1709-1791), a politician and agronomist.

Horace-Bénédict de Saussure (1740 – 1799), an 18th century naturalist, was probably the most notable, his portrait was on the 20 Swiss Francs bill series which were in circulation from 1979 to 1995. His daughter Albertine Necker de Saussure (1766-1841) became an advocate for women s education and his son Nicolas Théodore de Saussure (1767 – 1845) a plant physiologist.

His grandson was Henri Louis Frédéric de Saussure (1829 –1905) an entomologist and mineralist.

His 4 great-grandsons were: Ferdinand de Saussure (1857-1913), an important linguist and semiotician. followed by Horace de Saussure (1859-1926) a painter, their younger brother Léopold de Saussure (1866-1925) a sinologist and their youngest brother René de Saussure (1868 –1943) was a mathematician and Esperantist.

== American branch ==
Henri de Saussure (anglicized to Henry de Saussure, d. 1761), a scion of the Lausanne branch of the family, emigrated from Vaud in the Old Swiss Confederacy settling near Charleston, South Carolina. The four sons of Henri fought in the American Revolutionary War with only his son Daniel surviving. Daniel was the father of Henry William de Saussure, d. 1839, a notable jurist in the early days of the American republic and chancellor.

Another William F. De Saussure (1792 – 1870) became US Senator.

Louis D. DeSaussure, d.1888, was a slave trader.

There are still several descendants living with the current spelling being DeSaussure, deSaussure, de Saussure, or Desaussure in the United States.

== See also ==
- Wilmot Gibbes de Saussure
- Harriette Kershaw Leiding
