= Tariff of 1842 =

Historic United States tariff

- Long title: An Act to provide revenue from imports, and to change and modify existing laws imposing duties on imports, and for other purposes
- Nicknames: Black Tariff
- Enacted by: the 27th United States Congress
- Effective: August 30, 1842

Citations
- Statutes at Large: 5 Stat. 548

Codification
- Acts amended: Tariff of 1833
- Acts repealed: Walker Tariff (1846)

Legislative history
- Introduced in the House as H.R. 547; Committee consideration by House Committee on Ways and Means; Signed into law by President John Tyler on August 30, 1842

The Tariff of 1842, or Black Tariff as it became known, was a protectionist tariff schedule adopted in the United States. It reversed the effects of the Compromise Tariff of 1833, which contained a provision that successively lowered the tariff rates from their level under the Tariff of 1832 over a period of ten years until the majority of dutiable goods were to be taxed at 20%.

As the 20% level approached in 1842, industrial interests and members of the Whig Party began clamoring for protection by claiming that the reductions left them vulnerable to European competition.

The bill restored protection and raised average tariff rates to almost 40% and stipulated sweeping changes to the tariff schedule and collection system, most of which were designed to augment its protective character. It also replaced most ad valorem rates with specific duties, assessed on a good-by-good basis, and replaced the credit system of tariff finance with a cash payment system, collected at portside customs houses.

== Legislative history ==
The Black Tariff was signed into law somewhat reluctantly by President John Tyler, following a year of disputes with the Whig leaders in Congress over the restoration of national banking and the government's land disbursement policies. For the previous year, Whig leaders in Congress had sent bills to Tyler coupling the tariff hike with a public land disbursement package, which had been insisted upon by Henry Clay, prompting a presidential veto.

In the summer of 1842, representatives from the northeastern manufacturing states began feeling electoral pressures for a tariff hike before the elections that fall and abandoned Clay's land disbursement program. The resulting bill contained the tariff hike alone, which satisfied the manufacturers and was acceptable to Tyler since it lacked the land disbursement provisions.

The main beneficiary industry to receive protection under the tariff was iron. Import taxes on iron goods, both raw and manufactured, amounted to almost two thirds of their price overall and exceeded 100% on many items, such as nails and hoop iron. The law also raised the percentage of dutiable goods from just over 50% of all imports to over 85% of all imports.

== Impact ==
The impact of the 1842 tariff was felt almost immediately, with sharp decline in international trade in 1843. Imports into the United States nearly halved from their 1842 levels and exports, affected by overall trade patterns, dropped by approximately 20%.

The Tariff of 1842 was repealed in 1846, when it was replaced by the Walker Tariff. The Whigs' loss of Congress and the presidency in 1844 facilitated a Democratic-led effort to reduce the rates again. Concerns that the Black Tariff's high rates would suppress future trade and, with it, customs revenue fueled the movement to repeal the act.

The tariff act of 1842 had a significant impact on railroad building. The duty of $17/ton of hammered bar iron and $25/ton of rolled bar iron raised costs by 50 to 80%. This however ignored the boost this tariff provided to those industries, and the tariff was not in place long enough to allow domestic manufacturers to expand and lower their prices. The Walker tariff of 1846, a mere four years later, reduced the duty to 30%.

== See also ==
- Bluffton Movement
- Tariffs in the second Trump administration
