= Henry William de Saussure =

American politician (1763–1839)

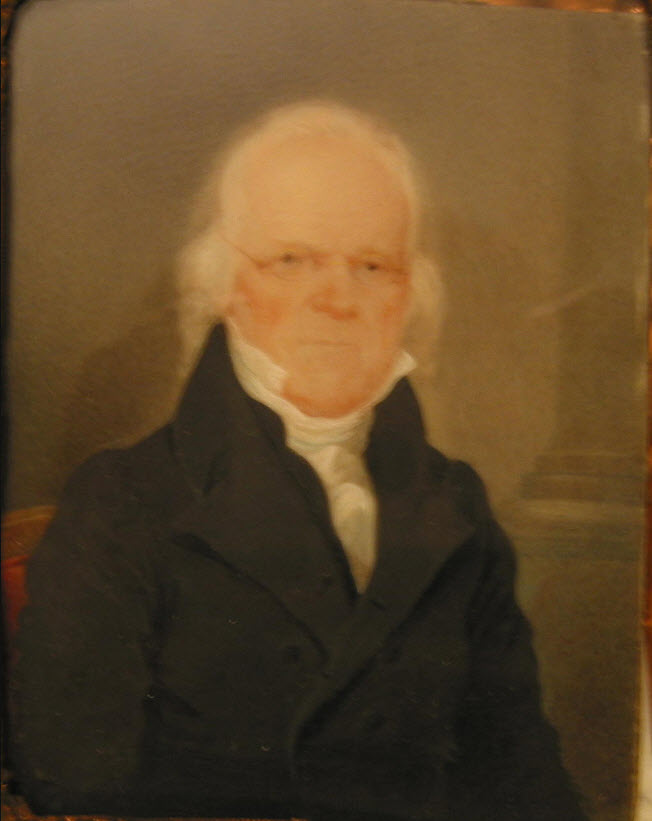

Director of the United States Mint
- In office July 1795 – October 1795
- President: George Washington
- Preceded by: David Rittenhouse
- Succeeded by: Elias Boudinot

Personal details
- Born: August 16, 1763 Pocotaligo, Jasper County, South Carolina
- Died: March 26, 1839 (aged 75) Columbia, South Carolina
- Party: Federalist
- Spouse(s): Elizabeth Ford of Morristown, New Jersey
- Education: Princeton College
- Occupation: Lawyer, politician, jurist, college founder and trustee

Henry William de Saussure (August 16, 1763 – March 26, 1839) was an American lawyer, state legislator and jurist from South Carolina who became a political leader as a member of the Federalist Party following the Revolutionary War. He was appointed by President George Washington as the 2nd Director of the United States Mint, was a co-sponsor of the legislation that established the South Carolina College which was to become the University of South Carolina and was given the title of Chancellor as a justice of the SC Equity Court, also known as chancery court. In this capacity he wrote and codified much of the state's equity law still in use today. He served as Intendant (Mayor) of Charleston while his son, William Ford de Saussure, likewise, served as Intendant (Mayor) of Columbia, SC.

He was a principal investor in founding what was originally intended to be the city's Federalist leaning newspaper, the Charleston Courier in 1803. The newspaper still exists today as it was merged with others over the course of two centuries to become The Post and Courier. As a sitting appellate court judge, his opinions on a variety of issues were widely published under a pseudonym, which was the custom then for public officials, particularly judges, who wished to express their views away from the bench.

He openly opposed Nullification along with other leading South Carolinians. After the Federalist Party faded in the early 1820s, he was a voice for Unionist moderation before a rising tide of States Rights supporters swept the stage of all others in South Carolina a generation later. Although deep political differences would eventually separate them, John C. Calhoun studied law in the offices of Henry de Saussure and Timothy Ford, his partner and brother-in-law. As a founder and early trustee of the University of South Carolina in Columbia, one of the original buildings located on the Horseshoe at the center of the campus, DeSaussure College, was named in his honor.

== Early life ==
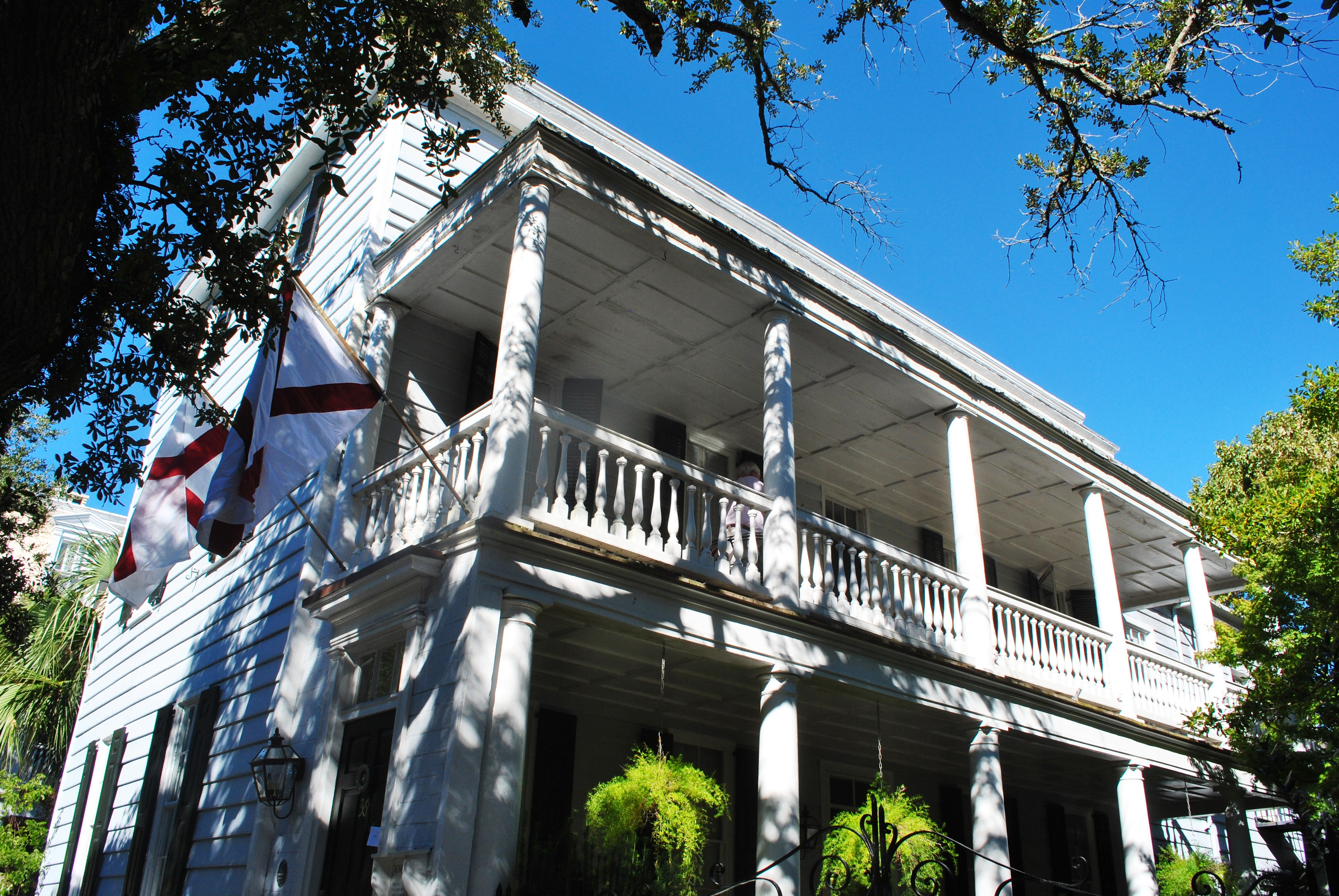
36 Meeting Street, Charleston, ca. 1740 is associated with many eminent South Carolina family names: DeSaussure, Vanderhorst, Brunch, Rivers, Kershaw and Pelzer

At the age of 16, together with his father Daniel de Saussure (1736–1798), he participated in the defense of the city during the 1780 Siege of Charleston. When the city surrendered to British forces, both were captured. As a prisoner of war, Henry was detained aboard the Pack-Horse, a prison ship in Charleston Harbor. Due to the deplorable conditions of the confinement, his health declined on board the ship. He was later released to his mother's custody and those others fortunate to survive the ordeal were released in a prisoner exchange in June 1781, more than a year after the surrender.

His father, Daniel, was deemed to be more of a prize and sent to the British prisons at St. Augustine, Florida along with other leaders of the American rebellion captured in South Carolina. As a prominent merchant in the city, Daniel's properties in Charleston and Beaufort were also confiscated. Daniel's wife, Mary, and their younger children, three daughters, were then exiled to Philadelphia for the remainder of the American Revolution. The family was reunited at Philadelphia after Henry's father was released as part of a prisoner exchange following the surrender of British forces at Yorktown. Still occupied, Charleston and New York City would remain in British hands for some time longer. Refugees and exiles were unable to return until after the withdrawal of British troops from those areas.

In addition to his father, Henry William de Saussure had three uncles who served as officers of the Continental Line during the American Revolution. All three uncles died in service to the American cause leaving no male heirs to the de Saussure family in America except that of Daniel. Louis de Saussure was killed during the Siege of Savannah in 1779. Henry de Saussure died in camp during the Siege of Charleston in 1780. Thomas de Saussure was killed at the Battle of Yorktown in 1781.

== Education and marriage ==
While in Philadelphia young de Saussure attended Princeton College and studied law under Jared Ingersoll, a noted Philadelphia attorney who would later be an active participant in the Constitutional Convention and a leading proponent of the Federalist Party. Before returning to Charleston, de Saussure married Elizabeth Ford, the daughter of Colonel Jacob Ford, Jr. and Theodosia Johnes Ford of Morristown, New Jersey. Henry and Elizabeth were married at her family's home in Morristown.

Henry & Eliza de Saussure had 12 children. Their second son, William F. De Saussure, was appointed to fill an unexpired term in the United States Senate in 1852. It was the same seat held by John C. Calhoun. Despite Henry de Saussure's early political association with the Federalist Party and later support of Unionist candidates in opposition to the Nullification movement, most notably Joel Roberts Poinsett, his son William Ford De Saussure would become a signer of the Ordinance of Secession in 1860.

== Famous family members ==
In addition to his son William F. De Saussure, notable relatives of Henry William de Saussure include his grandfather's brother César-François de Saussure (1705–1783), foreign service attaché and social commentator; European cousins Horace-Bénédict de Saussure (1740–1799), Swiss naturalist, Albertine Necker de Saussure (1766–1841), Swiss writer, educationalist, and advocate of education for women, Ferdinand de Saussure (1857–1913), Swiss linguist, and Éric de Saussure (1925–2007), Swiss artist and member of the Taizé Community. Other American descendants include grandson Wilmot Gibbes de Saussure (1822–1886), South Carolina militia general and South Carolina Secretary of the Treasury during the American Civil War and Arthur Ravenel Jr. (1927–2023), a member of the United States Congress who represented the First Congressional District of South Carolina from 1987 to 1995.

Government offices
Preceded by David Rittenhouse	2nd Director of the United States Mint; 1795	Succeeded by Elias Boudinot
Government offices
Preceded by John Edwards	9th Intendant (Mayor) of Charleston, South Carolina; 1797–1799	Succeeded by Thomas Roper
