= Wilmot Gibbes de Saussure =

American politician

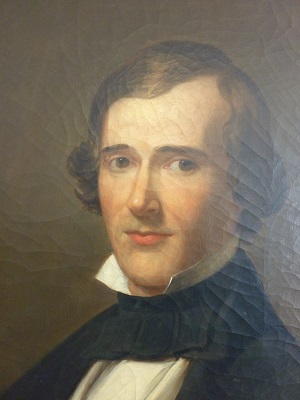
- Born: July 23, 1822; Charleston, South Carolina
- Died: February 1, 1886 (aged 63); Ocala, Florida
- Burial place: Charleston, South Carolina
- Relatives: Harriette Kershaw Leiding (granddaughter)
- Military career
- Allegiance: Confederate States of America
- Branch: South Carolina militia
- Service years: 1861–1865
- Rank: Brigadier General
- Conflicts: American Civil War
- Other work: Lawyer, historian

Wilmot Gibbes de Saussure (July 23, 1822 – February 1, 1886) was a brigadier general in the South Carolina militia, who served along with the Confederate States Army in South Carolina at various times during the American Civil War. As a colonel, he led his regiment in the occupation of Fort Moultrie and the bombardment of Fort Sumter at the beginning of the war. He was appointed brigadier general as well as adjutant general and inspector general of South Carolina militia in 1862. He commanded part of the Charleston defenses during the Union siege of the city in 1863. He also led his men in opposition to Major General William T. Sherman's march through the Carolinas.

De Saussure served five two-year terms in the South Carolina General Assembly in 1848–1849, 1854–1857 and 1860–1863. He also served as South Carolina Secretary of the Treasury from the summer of 1861 to April 11, 1862. After the war, de Saussure was a prominent lawyer and was active in civic affairs. He wrote several works of South Carolina history and was a grand master of Freemasons and president of the Huguenot Society, the Cincinnati Society and other civic organizations.

== Early life ==
Wilmot G. de Saussure was born in Charleston, South Carolina, on July 23, 1822. His parents were Henry A. de Saussure, a lawyer, and Susan (Boone) de Saussure. De Saussure graduated from the University of South Carolina in 1840 after two years of study. He then studied law and became a prominent lawyer at Charleston in practice with his father.

De Saussure served in the South Carolina House of Representatives of the South Carolina General Assembly in 1848–1849, 1854–1857 and 1860–1863.

Wilmot Gibbes de Saussure married Martha Gourdin. When their eldest son, Henry A. de Sassure, died in 1903, two adult sons and three adult daughters survived their brother.

== American Civil War service ==
Wilmot Gibbes de Saussure began his Civil War service as a colonel in the 1st South Carolina Artillery Regiment of the 4th Brigade of the South Carolina militia at the siege of Fort Sumter. His force occupied Fort Moultrie when the U.S. Army garrison withdrew to Fort Sumter on December 26, 1861. De Saussure was in command of the Morris Island batteries during the bombardment of Fort Sumter on April 12 through April 14, 1861.

In August 1861, de Saussure was appointed a brigadier general in the South Carolina militia and was given command of the 4th Brigade for the remainder of the war. On April 11, 1862, de Saussure was elected adjutant general and inspector general of the South Carolina militia. He also was appointed Secretary of the Treasury of South Carolina in the summer of 1861 by South Carolina Governor Francis Pickens.

De Saussure commanded a force of militia and Confederate States Army troops during the siege of Charleston in 1863. This force guarded the rear of the city.

In late 1864 and early 1865, de Saussure's men were sent to oppose the forces of Union Major General William T. Sherman as they marched through the Carolinas.

== Later life ==
After the war, Wilmot G. de Saussure was a prominent lawyer and was active in civic affairs in Charleston. He wrote several works of South Carolina history. He was president of the Huguenot Society and the Cincinnati Society (Sons of Cincinnati). He was also president of the St. Andrew's Society, the St. Cecilia Society and the Charleston Library Society. He was a Harbor Commissioner for Charleston and a member of the Chamber of Commerce. De Saussure was a Freemason. He served as a grand master of his lodge from 1873 to 1875. He also was a member of the Odd Fellows. Brother de Saussure served as Grand Sire during the term 1853–1855 – being installed in Philadelphia, Pennsylvania, and presiding in Baltimore, Maryland.

Wilmot Gibbes de Saussure died on February 1, 1886, in Ocala, Florida, where he had gone with the hope of restoring his deteriorated health. He is buried in Magnolia Cemetery, Charleston, South Carolina.

== See also ==
- List of American Civil War generals (Acting Confederate)
- De Saussure family
