= William F. De Saussure =

American politician (1792–1870)

William Ford De Saussure
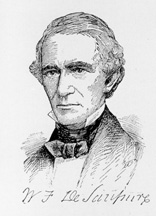

United States Senator from South Carolina
- In office May 10, 1852 – March 4, 1853
- Appointed by: John Hugh Means
- Preceded by: Robert Rhett
- Succeeded by: Josiah J. Evans

Member of the South Carolina House of Representatives from Richland District
- In office November 28, 1842 – December 17, 1847
- In office November 27, 1837 – December 21, 1839

Personal details
- Born: February 22, 1792 Charleston, South Carolina
- Died: March 13, 1870 (aged 78) Columbia, South Carolina
- Party: Democratic

William Ford De Saussure (February 22, 1792 – March 13, 1870) was a United States senator from South Carolina. Born in Charleston, the son of Henry William de Saussure and Elizabeth Ford De Saussure.

== Legal career ==
He graduated from Harvard University in 1810, studied law, was admitted to the bar and practiced in Charleston and Columbia.

In the 1820s de Saussure served two terms as Intendent, or Mayor, of the City of Columbia. He was a member of the South Carolina House of Representatives in 1846 and a judge of the chancery court in 1847.

In 1847 he was signatory to a letter advocating for the creation of more pro-slavery media environment in Washington, D.C. The letter is known only because it was republished in abolitionist newspaper The Liberator, reads in part: "The object of this communication is to obtain your aid and active co-operation, in establishing, at Washington, a Paper which shall represent Southern views on the subject of SLAVERY —Southern views of Southern Rights and Interests."

De Saussure was appointed May 10, 1852, and then elected November 29, 1852, as a Democrat to the U.S. Senate to fill the vacancy caused by the resignation of R. Barnwell Rhett and served from May 10, 1852, to March 4, 1853.

He resumed the practice of law in Columbia, and was a trustee of South Carolina College (now the University of South Carolina) at Columbia for many years. In December 1860 he was a delegate to South Carolina's Secession Convention and became a signer of the Ordinance of Secession which led directly to the opening hostilities of the Civil War.

== Death ==
He died in Columbia in 1870; interment was in the First Presbyterian Churchyard.

== Famous family members ==
The descendants of William Ford De Saussure include Arthur Ravenel, Jr. (1927–2023), a member of the United States Congress who represented South Carolina from 1987 to 1995.

U.S. Senate
| Preceded by Robert B. Rhett | U.S. senator (Class 2) from South Carolina; 1852–1853; Served alongside: Andrew P. Butler | Succeeded by Josiah J. Evans |
