= Charleston Mercury =

American newspaper (1819–1868)

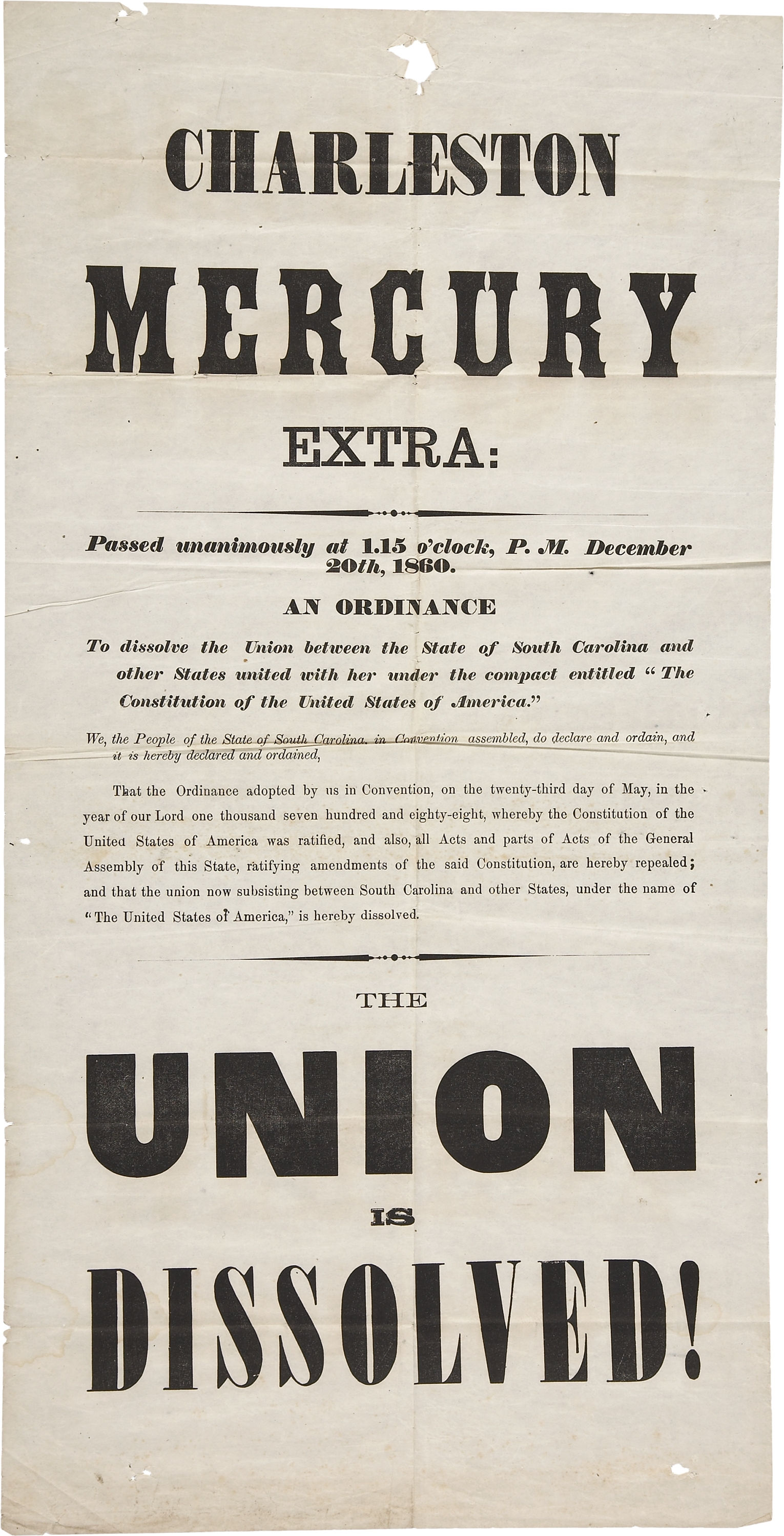
Special edition of the Charleston Mercury, announcing South Carolina's Ordinance of Secession on December 20, 1860.

The Charleston Mercury was a secessionist newspaper in Charleston, South Carolina, founded by Henry L. Pinckney in 1819. He was its sole editor for fifteen years. It ceased publication with the Union Army occupation of Charleston in February 1865. After the American Civil War, publication resumed in November 1866 before the paper closed permanently two years later in 1868.

== History ==
During the American Civil War, the paper was "strongly secessionist", calling upon South Carolinian men to take up arms to defend the South. Its owner, Robert Barnwell Rhett, had two plantations and 190 enslaved persons. The paper was critical of Davis and Confederate generals, in contrast with its pro-Davis competitor the Charleston Courier. Rhett's son R. Barnwell Rhett Jr. was the editor.

Humorist George William Bagby was a Richmond, Virginia correspondent of the Charleston Mercury during the Civil War era and "covered the politics of the war and made a reputation for Hermes, his pen name, as a fearless writer who would criticize Confederate General Robert E. Lee as easily as Confederate President Jefferson Davis".
