= R. Barnwell Rhett Jr. =

Confederate American newspaper editor (1828–1905)

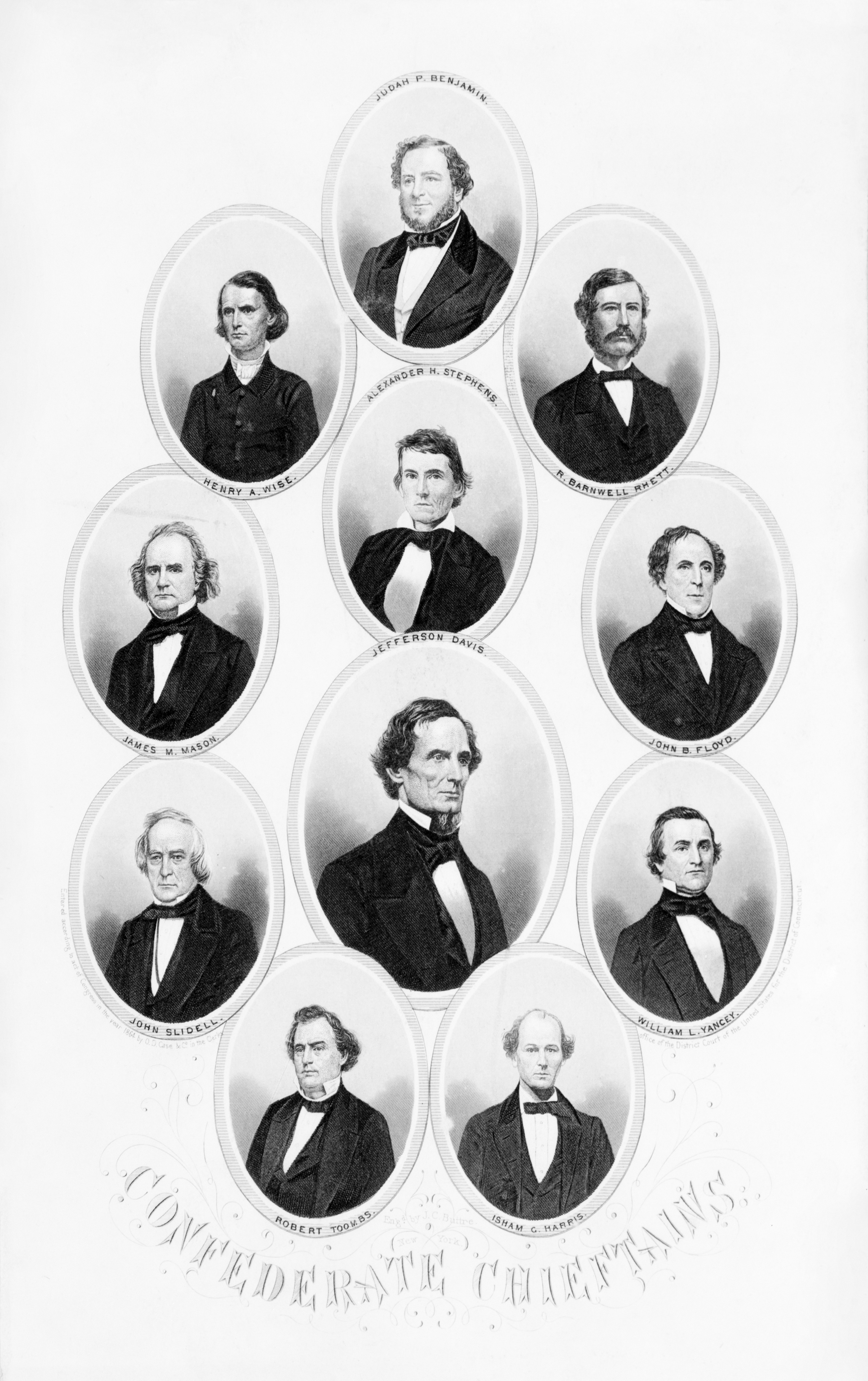
"Confederate Chieftains," including R. Barnwell Rhett, engraved by J.C. Buttre c. 1864 (Library of Congress Digital)

R. Barnwell Rhett Jr. (February 25, 1828 – January 29, 1905) was a Confederate-American thought leader who edited the pro-secession Charleston Mercury newspaper owned by his father, the Fire-Eater politician Robert B. Rhett. He was later a Reconstruction-era editor of the New Orleans Times-Picayune. He killed a New Orleans judge in a duel in 1873.

== Biography ==
After Rhett graduated from Harvard University, class of 1849, he became an attorney in South Carolina. He also assisted in running the family's South Carolina rice plantations, "managing successfully 350 negroes." He married in married Josephine Horton of Huntsville, Alabama, on October 9, 1851. She died in 1860. He began editing the Mercury in 1857, took a break to be a Confederate colonel in the American Civil War, and resumed that work from 1865 to 1867. He married second, Harriet Moore Barnard, in 1867. From 1872 to 1874, he was a pro-Democrat, pro-Redeemer editor of the Times-Picayune, "holding up to public contempt and ignominy, the leaders of the Carpet-baggers and Scallawags in the reconstruction days."

He engaged in a double-barrelled shotgun duel at forty paces with William Henry Cooley (1833–1873), judge of the sixth district court of the Parish of Orleans, "over a controversy that grew out of the heated Issues brought into public affairs by the atrocities of carpetbagger rule." Cooley was shot through the heart on the second round and died within six minutes.

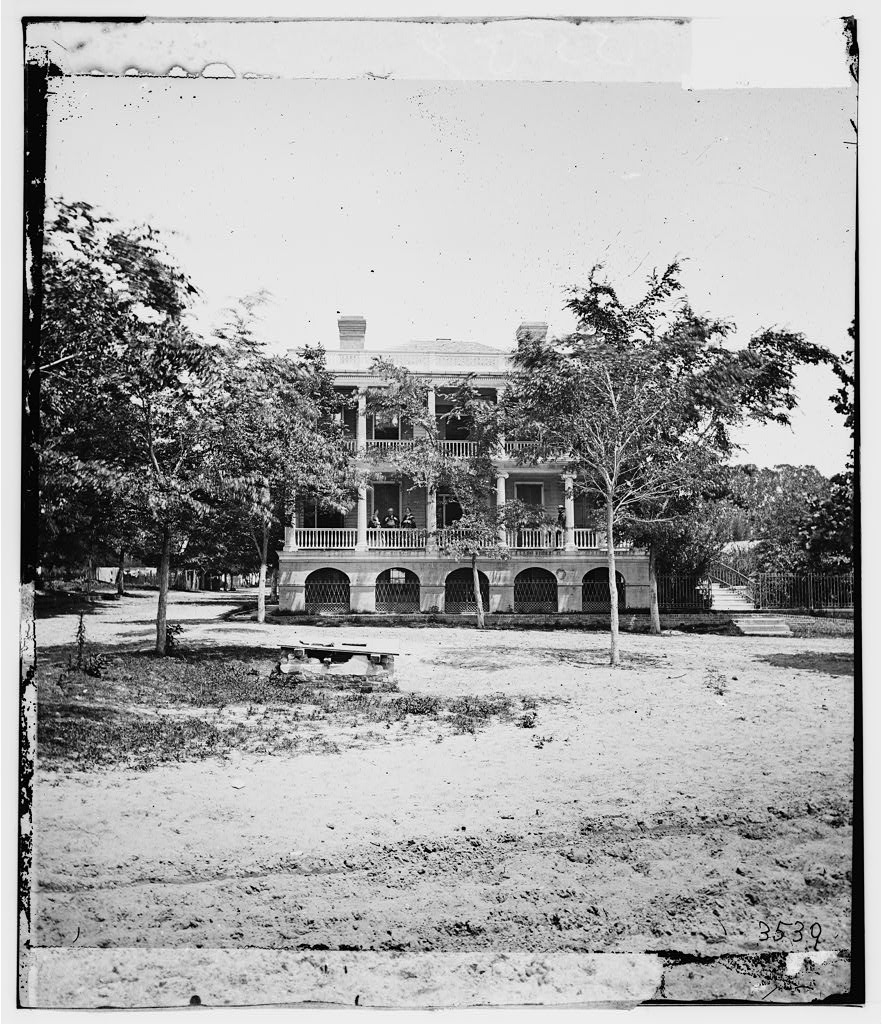
The Rhett family plantation, at Beaufort, Port Royal Island, was occupied by the Union Army early in the American Civil War, and the people who had been enslaved there were emancipated; the freedom of 350 slaves would have been a financial loss for the Rhetts of, very conservatively, US$300,000 (equivalent to $6,309,783 in 2025)

According to a 1905 account, Cooley was a native Louisianan and a Confederate veteran but also a stern enforcer of the law, and "Judge Cooley never lost an opportunity to declare the civil rights bill valid. One day a number of negroes went into Dumantiel's cafe in New Orleans, one of the most fashionable in the city and demanded that they be served. They were politely informed that colored persons were not entertained in that establishment. In an hour afterwards the proprietor was arrested. He was taken before Judge Cooley, tried and fined $1,000 and costs." Rhett oversaw (or wrote) a vicious editorial, Cooley challenged him to a duel, they met at Bay St. Louis on a gloomy day, and Cooley lost. As recollected from the distance of 1905, "The affair created a tremendous sensation, but nothing was ever done about it, and the memory of the tragedy gradually died away like many other things that occurred during those dark days."

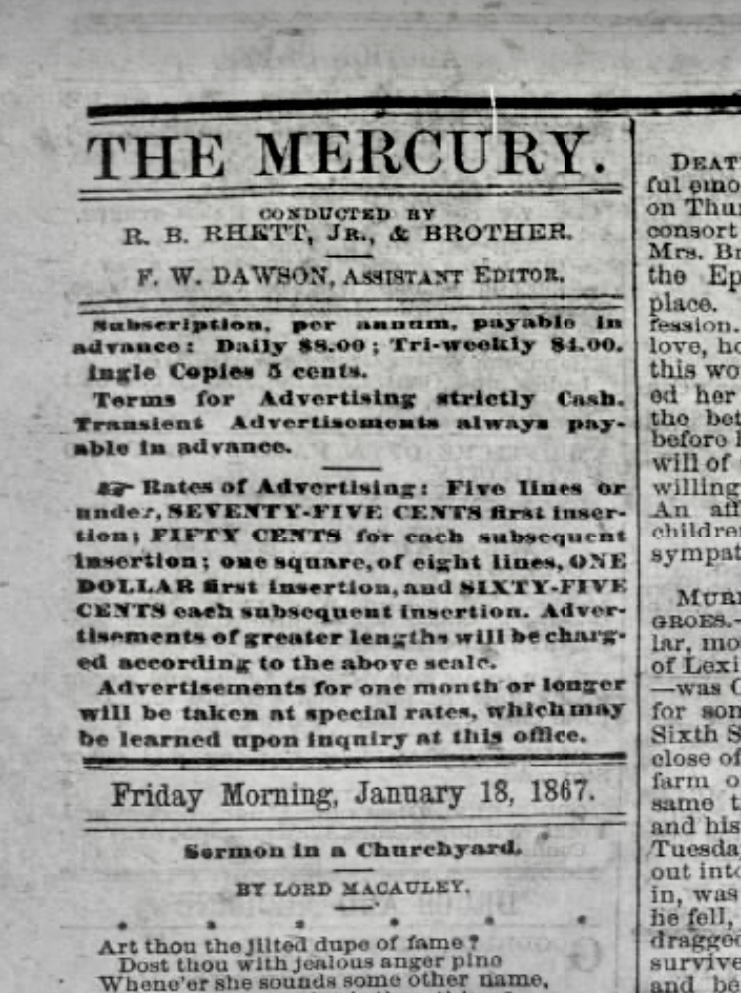
Mercury masthead 1867

Rhett's newspaper career ended in 1874 and he retired to Huntsville, Alabama. In Huntsville he had a cotton plantation and "was active in state political affairs." He served on the board of a trustees of the University of Alabama, was a Huntsville town booster, and was a member of the Chamber of Commerce. He died after a long and painful illness, and was buried at Maple Hill Cemetery in that city.

== See also ==
- Port Royal Experiment
- Alfred M. Rhett (brother)
- Sallie Rhett Roman (sister)
- List of duels § United States
- Dueling in the Southern United States
