= Fire-Eaters =

Antebellum America pro-slavery Southern secessionist movement

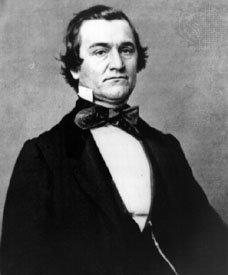
William Lowndes Yancey.

In American history, the Fire-Eaters were a loosely aligned group of radical pro-secession Democrats in the antebellum South who urged the separation of the slave states into a new nation, in which chattel slavery and a distinctive "Southern civilization" would be preserved. Some sought to revive American participation in the Atlantic slave trade, which had been illegal since 1808. After eleven southern states declared independence from the United States in 1861, several Fire-Eaters were outspoken critics of the new Confederate government during the American Civil War.

== Impact ==
Dubbed “Fire-Eaters” by critics, the group was not a cohesive political faction but a collection of radical Democrats well known for their extreme rhetoric and nationalist demands for an independent southern nation. Among the best known Fire-Eaters were Edmund Ruffin, Robert Barnwell Rhett, Louis T. Wigfall, and William Lowndes Yancey. By urging secession in the South, the Fire-Eaters aggravated the growth of divisive sectionalism in the U.S., and they materially contributed to the outbreak of the Civil War (1861–1865).

At an 1850 convention in Nashville, Tennessee, Fire-Eaters urged Southern secession, citing what they called irreconcilable differences between the North and the South, and they inflamed passions by using propaganda against the North. However, the Compromise of 1850 and other concessions isolated the Fire-Eaters for a while.

In the latter half of the 1850s, the group reemerged. During the election of 1856, Fire-Eaters used threats of secession to persuade Northerners, who generally valued saving the Union over fighting slavery, to vote for James Buchanan. They used several recent events for propaganda, among them "Bleeding Kansas" and the caning of Charles Sumner, to accuse the North of trying to abolish slavery immediately. Using effective propaganda against 1860 presidential candidate Abraham Lincoln, the nominee of the anti-slavery Republican Party, the Fire-Eaters were able to convince many Southerners of this. However, Lincoln, despite abolitionist sentiment within the party, had promised not to abolish slavery in the Southern states, but only to prevent its expansion into the Western territories. They first targeted South Carolina, which passed an Ordinance of Secession in December 1860. Wigfall, for one, actively encouraged an attack on Fort Sumter to prompt Virginia and other upper Southern States to secede as well. The Fire-Eaters helped to unleash a chain reaction that led directly to the formation of the Confederate States of America and the Civil War. Their influence waned quickly after the start of major fighting.

== Notable Fire-Eaters ==
- William W. Avery
- Albert G. Brown
- Joseph E. Brown
- Thomas R. R. Cobb
- William Colquitt
- James Dunwoody Brownson De Bow, publisher of De Bow's Review
- James Gadsden
- Maxcy Gregg
- Daniel Harvey Hill
- Thomas C. Hindman
- Laurence M. Keitt
- Lucius Quintus Cincinnatus Lamar
- William Porcher Miles
- Edward A. O'Neal
- Albert Pike
- Edmund Pettus
- John J. Pettus, Governor of Mississippi, who would lead the state in secession
- Francis Wilkinson Pickens, Governor of South Carolina; authorized firing on Star of the West
- Roger Atkinson Pryor
- John A. Quitman, debatable
- Henry Massey Rector
- Robert Rhett
- Edmund Ruffin, said to have fired what is considered the first shot of the Civil War
- Nathaniel Beverley Tucker
- Louis Wigfall
- William Lowndes Yancey
- David Levy Yulee

== See also ==
- Movement to reopen the transatlantic slave trade
