= Corday =

Corday is a surname. Notable people with the surname include:

- Barbara Corday (born 1944), American television executive, writer, and producer
- Ben Corday (1875–1938), American tattoo artist and actor
- Betty Corday (1912–1987), American soap opera producer, wife of Ted Corday
- Charlotte Corday (1768–1793), assassin of Jean-Paul Marat
- Christine Corday (born 1970), American artist
- Deniz Corday, started a disco in Walton-on-Thames in 1958
- Irène Corday (1919–1996), French film actress
- Jennifer Corday (born 1966), American singer and songwriter
- Ken Corday (born 1960), American soap opera producer and composer, son of Betty and Ted Corday
- Mara Corday (1930–2025), American actress and Playboy playmate
- Marcelle Corday (1890–1971), Belgian-born American actress
- Rita Corday (1920–1992), American actress
- Ted Corday (1908–1966), American soap opera producer, husband of Betty Corday

== Fictional characters ==
- Addison Corday, a character in the film Saw II
- Elizabeth Corday, a character in the television series ER

== See also ==
- Corday–Morgan Prize
- Charlotte Corday (disambiguation)
- Corday Productions, an American production company
- Colias corday, synonym for Phoebis philea, a type of butterfly
- Cordray
- Corddry
