= The Store =

The Store may refer to:

- The Store (Bluffton, South Carolina), United States, a historic building
- The Store (novel), a 1932 novel by Thomas Sigismund Stribling
- The Store (TV channel), a British shopping TV channel
- "The Store", a song from the soundtrack of Danganronpa Another Episode: Ultra Despair Girls
- "The Store," a gambling den that Michael Cassius McDonald operated in Chicago in the latter 19th century

== See also ==
- Store (disambiguation)
