= Lockwood House =

Lockwood House may refer to:

- Allen-Lockwood House, Bluffton, South Carolina
- Henry Lockwood House, Harpers Ferry, West Virginia
- Hoffecker-Lockwood House, Kenton, Delaware
- Isaac Lockwood House, Marshall, Michigan, listed on the National Register of Historic Places (NRHP)
- J.C. Lockwood House, Milan, Ohio, listed on the NRHP
- Lockwood-Boynton House, North Springfield, Vermont
- Lockwood–Mathews Mansion, Norwalk, Connecticut
