= Cordray =

Cordray is a surname. Notable people with this surname include:

== People ==
- Kenny Cordray (1954–2017), American guitarist and songwriter
- Richard Cordray (b. 1959), American lawyer and politician

== Fictional characters ==
- Danny Cordray, traveling salesman in The Office

== See also ==
- Corday
- Corddry
- Corderoy
- Cordray House
