= Jorge Cordero =

Jorge Cordero may refer to:

- Jorge Cordero (musician) (born 1952), Cuban singer, guitarist and percussionist
- Jorge Cordero (footballer) (born 1962), Peruvian footballer
