= Seven Oaks, Bluffton, South Carolina =

Historic house in South Carolina, United States

- Seven Oaks
- U.S. Historic district – Contributing property
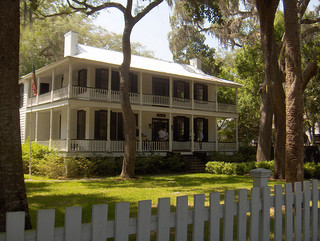
- Seven Oaks
- Location: 82 Calhoun Street, Bluffton, South Carolina
- Coordinates: 32.2327°N 80.8633°W
- Built: c. 1850
- Architectural style: Greek Revival
- Part of: Bluffton Historic District (ID96000686)
- Designated CP: June 21, 1996

Seven Oaks is located in Bluffton, South Carolina. It was built in 1850. This is a two-story house with double verandas on the south and east sides and two exterior chimneys. The house is called Seven Oaks due to seven very large live oak stumps that support the house. Some of the original interior details remain; there is a visible line running east to west down the center of the northeast parlor floor indicating that an addition was made at some time.

The first owner of the house was Colonel Middleton Stuart and his wife, Emma Barnwell Stoney. In 1866 the property was sold to Frances Marion Edward; subsequently, it was owned by Ephraim Mikell Baynard, then E. L Harrison and later by the Baynard family of Hilton Head Island.

In the 1920s, Mrs. Elizabeth Sanders operated Seven Oaks as a popular and successful boarding house for salesmen and summer visitors.

After a complete renovation which began in 2007, the house was home to a civil war museum before being sold in 2012 as a private home.

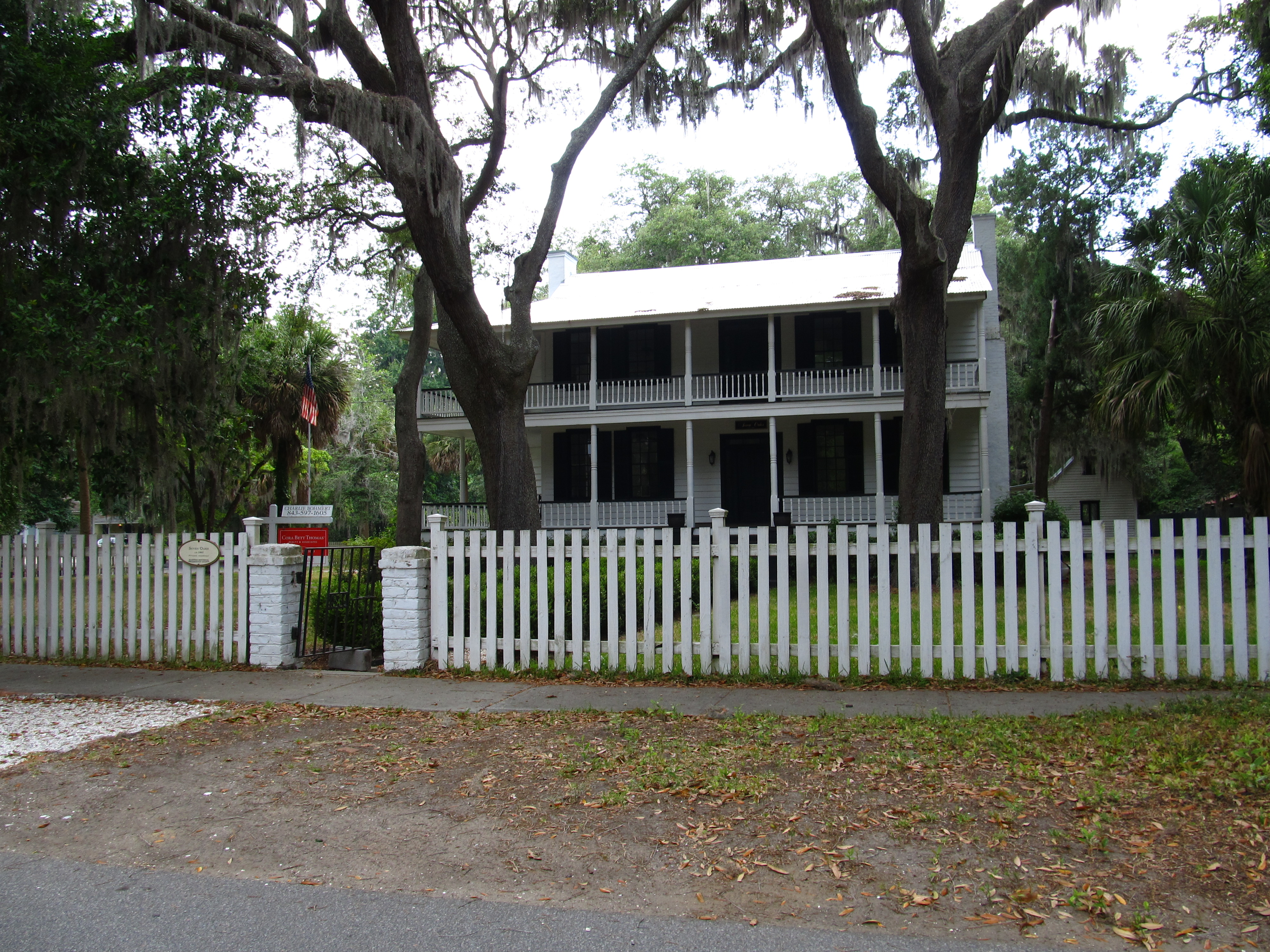
Seven Oaks in Bluffton, South Carolina
