= Cordero =

- Origin: Spain

Cordero is a surname of Spanish and Italian origin. The name means "young lamb" per the Latin cordarius (a derivative of cordus meaning young or new). It may be the occupational name for a shepherd, or a nickname meaning lamb.

== People with the surname ==
- Andrea Cordero Lanza di Montezemolo (1925–2017), Italian Cardinal of the Roman Catholic Church
- Angel Cordero Jr. (born 1942), Puerto Rican jockey
- Atilano Cordero Badillo (born 1943), Puerto Rican entrepreneur and supermarket owner
- Ava Cordero (born c. 1983), American model who accused Jeffrey Epstein of abuse
- Chad Cordero (born 1982), American professional baseball player
- Desirée Cordero Ferrer (born 1993), Spanish model, Miss Spain 2014
- Eugene Cordero, American actor
- Federico A. Cordero (1928–2012), Puerto Rican classical guitarist
- Franchy Cordero (born 1994), Dominican baseball player
- Francisco Cordero (born 1975), Dominican professional baseball player
- Georgina Febres-Cordero (1861–1925), Venezuelan nun
- Gilda Cordero-Fernando (1930–2020), Filipina writer and publisher
- Place of origin Italy
  Joaquín Cordero (1923–2013), Mexican actor
- Jorge Cordero (musician) (born 1952), Cuban singer, guitarist and percussionist
- Jorge Cordero (footballer) (born 1962), Peruvian footballer
- Juan Cordero (1822–1884), Mexican painter and muralist
- Juan César Cordero Dávila (1904–1965), Puerto Rican Major General in the US Army
- León Febres Cordero (1931–2008), President of Ecuador 1984–1988
- Luca Cordero di Montezemolo (born 1947), Italian businessman, Chairman of Ferrari
- Luis Cordero Crespo (1833–1912), President of Ecuador 1892–1895
- Maria Cordero (a.k.a. Fat Mama Maria) (born 1954), singer, actress, and chef from Macau
- Mariana Cordero, Spanish actress
- Mario Cordero (a.k.a. Catato) (1930–2002), Costa Rican professional football player and coach
- Miguel Febres Cordero (1854–1910), Ecuadoran educator, member of the Christian Brothers order
- Nick Cordero (1978–2020), Canadian actor
- Olga Sánchez Cordero (born 1955), Mexican jurist, Supreme Court Justice
- Paquito Cordero (1932–2009), Puerto Rican comedian and television producer
- Rafael "Churumba" Cordero Santiago (1942–2004), Puerto Rican politician, Mayor of Ponce 1989–2004
- Rafael Cordero (1790–1868), Puerto Rican educator, known as “The Father of Public Education in Puerto Rico”
- Rodrigo Cordero (born 1973), Costa Rican professional football player
- Víctor Cordero (born 1973), Costa Rican professional football player
- Roque Cordero (1917–2008), Panamanian-American composer
- Sebastián Cordero (born 1972), Ecuadoran film director, writer, and editor
- Wil Cordero (a.k.a. Coco) (born 1971), Puerto Rican professional baseball player
- Winnie Cordero (born 1966), Filipina comedian, actress, and TV host

== See also ==
- Camp Cordero Water Aerodrome, aerodrome in British Columbia, Canada
- Estadio Eladio Rosabal Cordero, stadium in Heredia, Costa Rica
- Cordero Rojo Mine, coal mine in Wyoming, United States
- Corderoy
