= Lynn Roberts =

American jazz musician (1935–2017)

- Born: Leonore Theresa Raisig; January 9, 1935; New York City, U.S.
- Died: January 21, 2017 (aged 82) Sun City Hilton Head, South Carolina, U.S.
- Genres: Big band; jazz

Lynn Roberts (born Leonore Theresa Raisig; January 9, 1935 – January 21, 2017) was an American big band singer.

== Life ==
She was born in Brooklyn, New York, and grew up in Queens. Her father, an accountant, encouraged her in show business, and she performed on stage aged 8. At age 15 she joined Charlie Spivak's band.

She subsequently sang with the bands of Vincent Lopez, Tommy and Jimmy Dorsey and Benny Goodman, performing at venues including the Cafe Rouge and the Paramount Theatre in New York, and the Hollywood Palladium in Los Angeles.

In 1961 Roberts sang the vocal under the Kimbo Record Label, "Tom Tom Rock." Composed by McRae. Produced by Kimbo Music Pub. Co. Copyright 1961.

For 18 months she sang on a TV show with Sammy Kaye. She toured with Doc Severinsen; she sang with the Pied Pipers for many years. She was the voice behind advertising jingles for Pan Am, Chiquita Bananas, Campbell's Soup and others.

Lynn Roberts was in the cast of the musical Ballroom, which ran from December 1978 to March 1979. For four years until his death in 1983, she was the lead singer with the Harry James band; during that period she performed with the band at President Ronald Reagan's inaugural ball. Her album Harry, You Made Me Love You was a tribute to Harry James, arranged and conducted by Angelo DiPippo.

In later years she regularly sang with Bob Alberti's trio, in Hilton Head Island, South Carolina, and her last album was Just Between Friends, with Bob Alberti, whom she had known in Charlie Spivak's band.

She died aged 82 on January 21, 2017, at her home in Sun City Hilton Head.

== Family ==
She married Daryl Campbell, the lead trumpet player in the Charlie Spivak orchestra, at the age of 19; they were married for 17 years, and had three children. She later married Lewis Hankins.
