= D. Hasell Heyward House =

Coordinates: 32.2354°N 80.8627°W

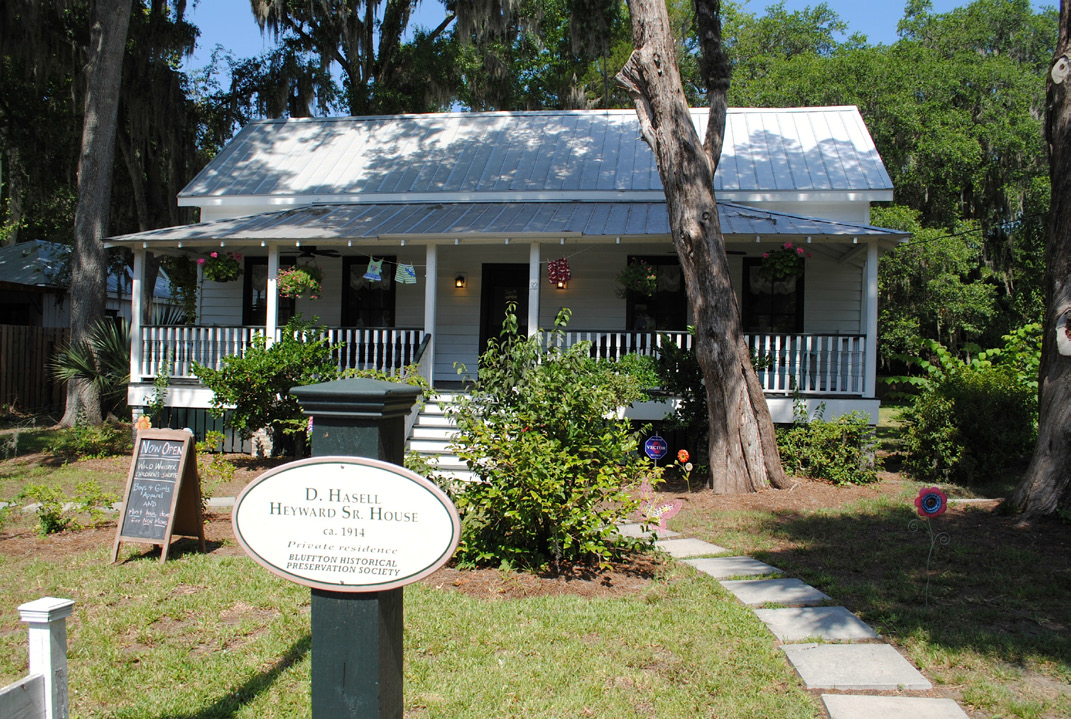
The D. Hasell Heyward House

The D. Hasell Heyward House, is located in Bluffton, South Carolina. It was built in 1914. This cottage was built by Nathan Crosby in 1914 for Daniel Hasell Heyward, Sr. and his wife Hattie Mae Mulligan. Constructed of pine on high brick pilings it has a wide central hallway flanked by large high-ceiling rooms with horizontal narrow pine boards on the walls and ceilings, simple moldings and tall windows front and back. A wide porch stretches the length of the front facade. The structure was restored by Lewis Hammett, Jr. Esq. and serves as his law offices.
