= Huger-Gordon House =

House in Bluffton, South Carolina, US

Coordinates: 32.2315°N 80.8643°W

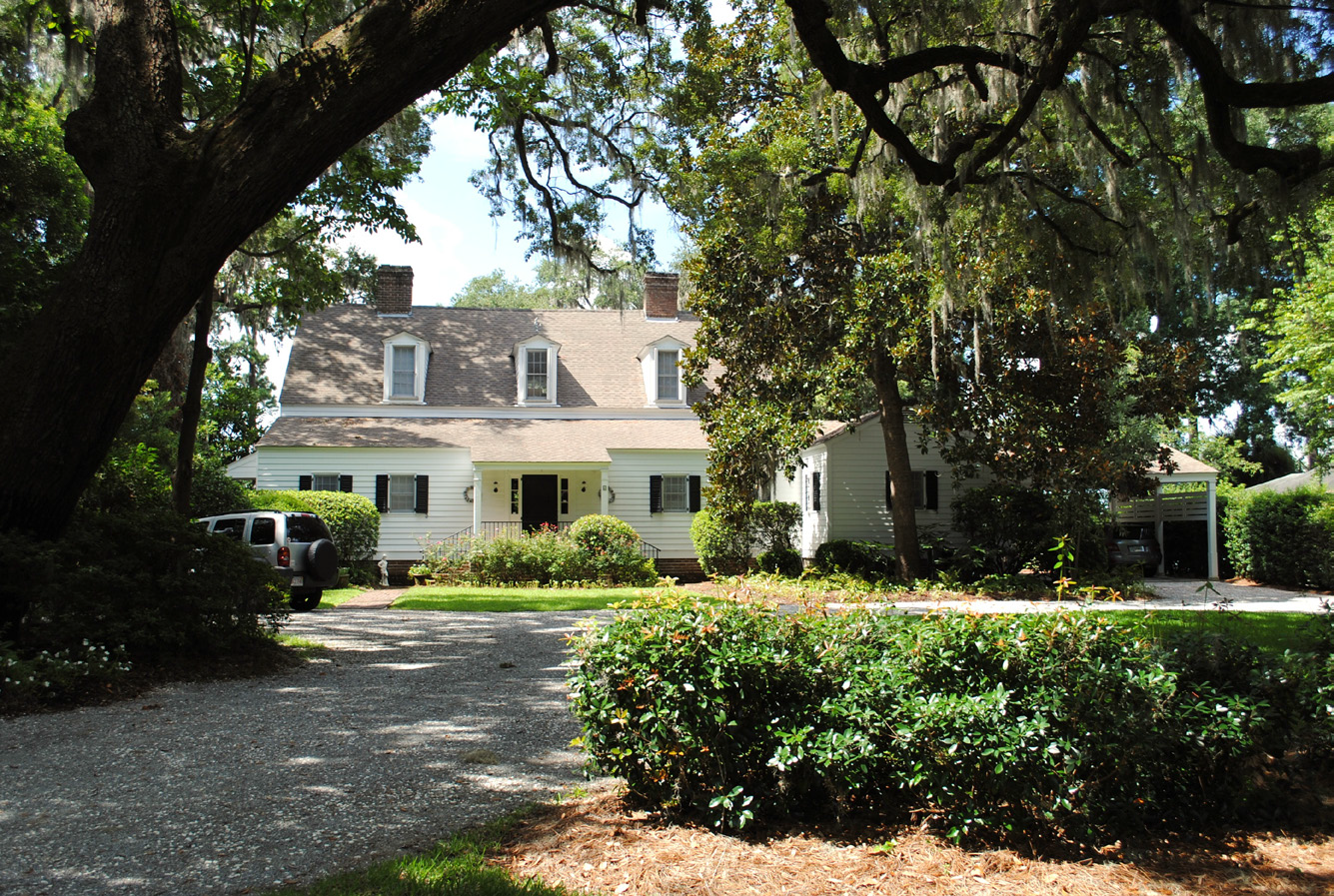
The Huger-Gordon House

The Huger-Gordon House, is located in Bluffton, South Carolina. It was built in 1795. This is the only antebellum house located on the bluff overlooking the May River that survived the Burning of Bluffton on June 4, 1863. Minié balls, lodged in the front door studs give evidence of the sniping that took place between Union forces and Confederate pickets here. The frame 1 1/2-story building is placed on a low brick foundation of piers with a gabled roof and interior chimneys. A one-story veranda with a shed roof and chamfered posts, runs the width of the house on the riverside and the central dormer has glass doors cut into the eave of the roof and veranda. It is believed the house was built around 1795 and enlarged in the 1820s. The owner in 1863 was Colonel Ephraim Mikell Seabrook who had acquired the property from Dr. William Lowndes Hamilton in 1855. Dr. Joseph Alston Huger, II bought the property from the Seabrook's in 1882 and it remained in the Huger family until 2013. Mr. & Mrs. Hugh Gordon made alterations to the exterior and interior in the 1970s.
