= Church of the Cross =

Historic church in South Carolina, United States

- The Church of the Cross
- U.S. National Register of Historic Places
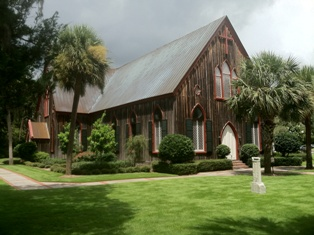

- Location within South Carolina Location within the United States
- Location: 110 Calhoun St., Bluffton, South Carolina
- Coordinates: 32°13′52″N 80°51′52″W
- Area: 1.3 acres (0.53 ha)
- Built: 1857
- Architect: White, Edward Brickell
- Architectural style: Gothic, Carpenter Gothic
- NRHP reference No.: 75001686
- Added to NRHP: May 29, 1975

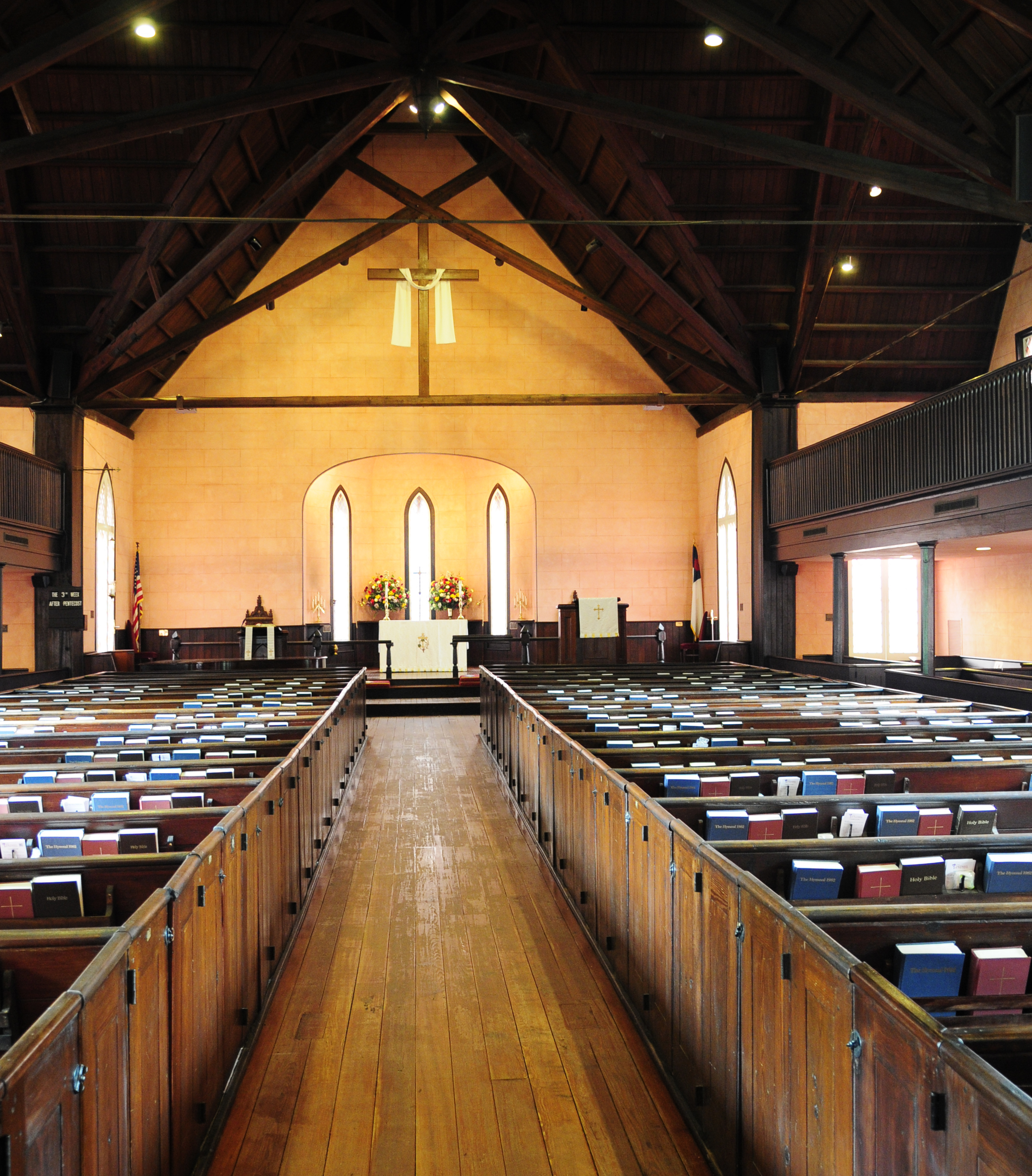
Interior view

The Church of the Cross is a historic church on Calhoun Street in Bluffton, South Carolina.

It was built in 1857 and added to the National Register in 1975. It is currently in the Anglican Diocese of South Carolina and part of a larger Church of the Cross campus.

== History ==
=== Earlier Congregations: 1767–1857 ===
Formal worship in the Bluffton area traces its roots to the establishment in 1767 of St. Luke's Parish, where a church was built near Pritchardville in 1787. Service on “The Bluff” of the May River first took place in the early 1830s. The young town of Bluffton was a summer resort for the area and inland planters and a stop on the ferry route between Savannah and Beaufort. By 1842, a chapel was built near the current location of The Church of the Cross.

=== Antebellum Period: 1857–1861 ===
In July 1857, the present building was consecrated. Architect E. B. White designed a structure described then as a “handsome cruciform Gothic building”. Fanned arches with a look of palmettos top its mullioned windows that are framed by latticed shutters. The builders sent to England for the rose-colored glass in the windows. Inside, soft-pink-scored plaster enhances the warm light. Exposed pine timbers evoke power and stability.

=== Federal Occupation: 1861–1865 ===
In 1863, Federal troops marched into Bluffton. burning most of the town. Although the church was spared, its congregation fled. Services on The Bluff resumed in 1870 when the Rev. E. E. Bellinger arrived and oversaw repairs.

=== Post War: 1865–1975 ===
In 1892, the roof was replaced, but the deadly hurricane of 1898 damaged it and the rest of the building. By February 1900, all was repaired. Workers remodeled the chancel and fashioned from the original pulpit and desk a walnut altar with a stone top, a pulpit and a prayer desk. A chapel area was created in the Narthex, which was easy to heat for the sparse winter congregation.

=== Current congregation: 1975–present ===
The National Register of Historic Places has listed The Church of the Cross since 1975. In keeping with the church's rapid growth, members built the first rectory in 1986. With the continuing growth that the church has experienced in recent years, this building became the church business office in 2001.

When the roof of the church was being replaced in 1991, the bees that were in the walls of the church were relocated to a hive in Beaufort. The women of the church gave out the idea of selling the honey from the bees as "holy honey", and the idea went through. The church has continued to sell the honey to this day at local markets. Bees have since been welcomed back into the church's walls.

In 1997, the Narthex wall was moved back to its original location, expanding nave seating for the growing congregation. Stairs now lead up to the renovated balcony above, which is home to the choir and the English pipe organ installed in 1999. In the two decades since The Church of the Cross grew from a mission to a parish, the number of parishioners increased twenty-fold, with in excess of seventy lay-led ministries added to serve the parish and surrounding communities.

Members of the parish founded Cross Schools Inc, which opened with seven first graders in 1998. Land was purchased for a school campus in 2000. The school continued to grow, adding a grade each year, in rented space until the construction of its first building in 2005. Today Cross Schools serves over 600 students ranging from twelve month old toddlers through eleventh grade with the first senior class being added in fall of 2023. A traditional chapel was added to the Cross Schools Campus in February 2020 where the Parish offices for the Church are now located, weekly chapels for the students are held and a traditional weekend service is also held. Phase VI of building on the Cross Schools campus was completed in December 2021 with the construction of a three-story building to house athletics and the high school.

The school is mentioned in the parish’s history because it functions in a partnership with the parish, and the parish uses space on the campus to conduct contemporary Sunday morning worship services.

== Worship ==
The worship department is, like the church itself, rooted in the doctrine and practice of the Anglican Church, and based in a blend of the Book of Common Prayer and contemporary worship. Five services are held each week on two campuses:

- Saturday, 5:28pm – Gracetime: Casual Eucharist Service
- Sunday, 8:00am – Traditional Holy Eucharist
- Sunday, 9:00am - Blended Holy Eucharist (located off-site at The Chapel on the Cross Schools Campus, 491 Buckwalter Parkway, Bluffton)
- Sunday, 10:30am – CrossPoint: Modern/Contemporary (located off-site at Cross Schools Campus Gym, 495 Buckwalter Parkway, Bluffton)
- Sunday, 10:00am – Blended Holy Eucharist
