= Patz Brothers House =

- U.S. National Register of Historic Places
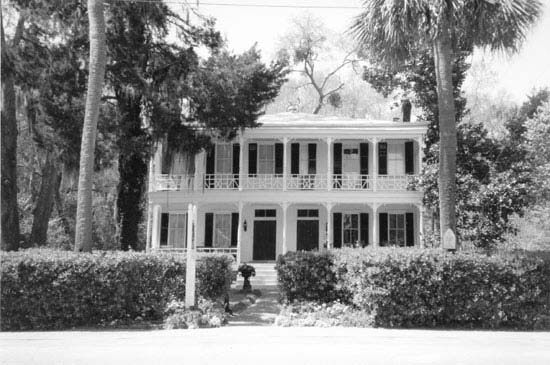
- The Patz Brothers House
- Location: Bluffton, South Carolina, United States
- Coordinates: 32.2357°N 80.8626°W
- Built: 1892
- Architectural style: Victorian
- NRHP reference No.: 90000966
- Added to NRHP: June 21, 1990

The Patz Brothers House, is located in Bluffton, South Carolina. It was built in 1892. The history of these houses and the Planters Mercantile are woven together. The Patz brothers, Moses and Abram, came from the northeast around 1890. They built the Planters Mercantile first and then in 1892 constructed a semi-detached double residence next door. The paired houses were mirror images with highly decorative eave and porch ornamentation of the late Victorian age. This style while rare in other parts of the county is very prevalent in the south, though The Patz Brothers House is only one of two of its kind in Bluffton. The houses share a central wall. Each house had its own front door, hall, stairway and six rooms. Mr. & Mrs. Lewis J. Hammet restored the exterior. The removal of the interior dividing wall to allow for a wide central staircase leading to the upstairs was done in the 1950s when the house was called "the Old Pinckney Boarding House" .
