= Campbell Chapel African Methodist Episcopal Church (Bluffton, South Carolina) =

Historic church in South Carolina, United States

- U.S. National Register of Historic Places
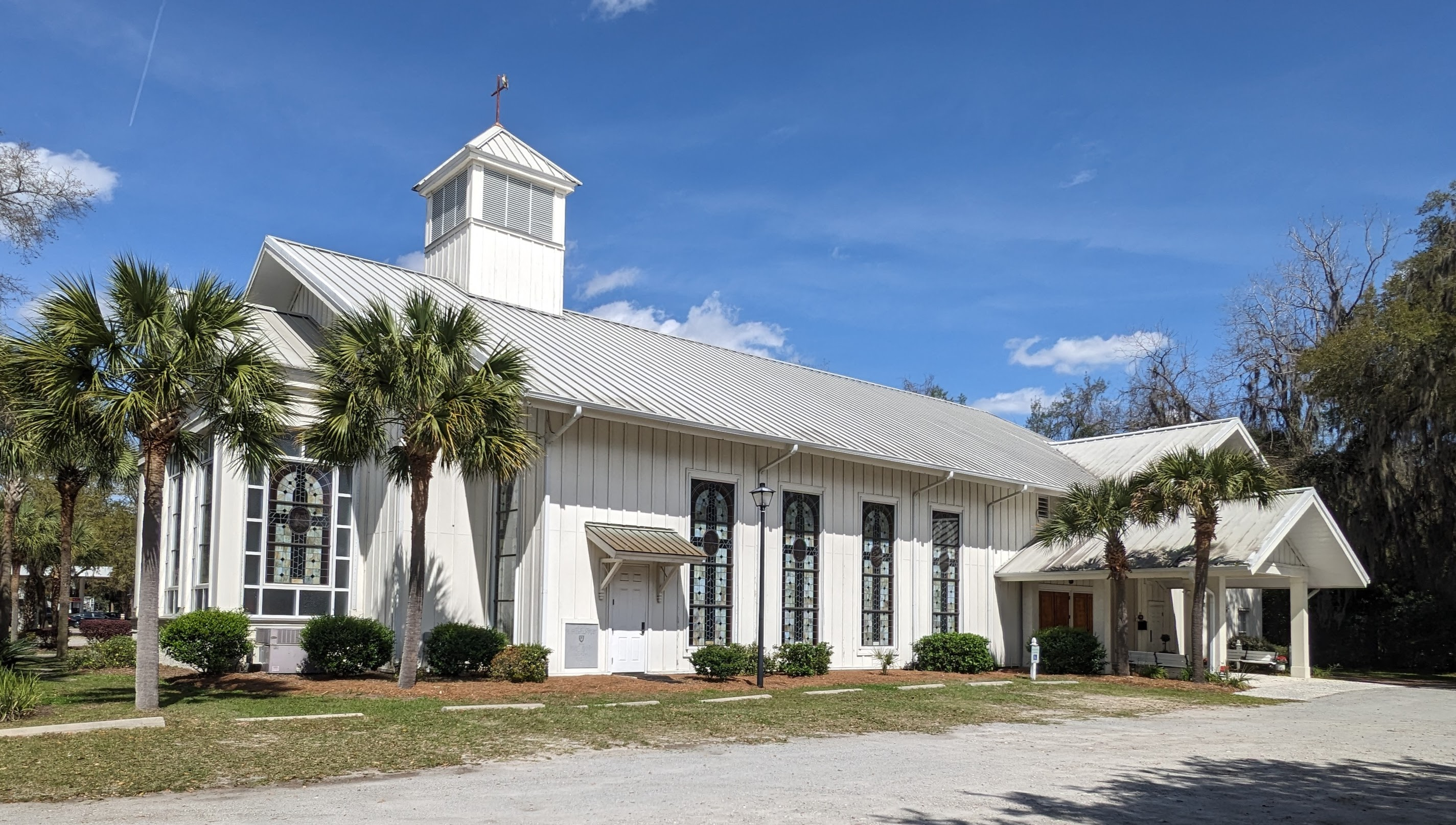

- Location within South Carolina Location within the United States
- Location: Bluffton, South Carolina
- Coordinates: 32°14′11″N 80°51′39″W
- Area: less than one acre
- Built: 1853
- Architectural style: Greek Revival
- NRHP reference No.: 100003688
- Added to NRHP: April 26, 2019

Campbell Chapel African Methodist Episcopal Church is a historic church and congregation in Bluffton, South Carolina.

It was built at 23 Boundary Street in 1853 by a white congregation and was acquired for use by the African Methodist Episcopal Church congregation in 1874. It was added to the National Register of Historic Places in 2019. Its National Register listing recognized its Greek Revival architectural style, reporting "structure retains much of its 19th century form and fabric".
