= Heyward House and Historical Center =

The Heyward House
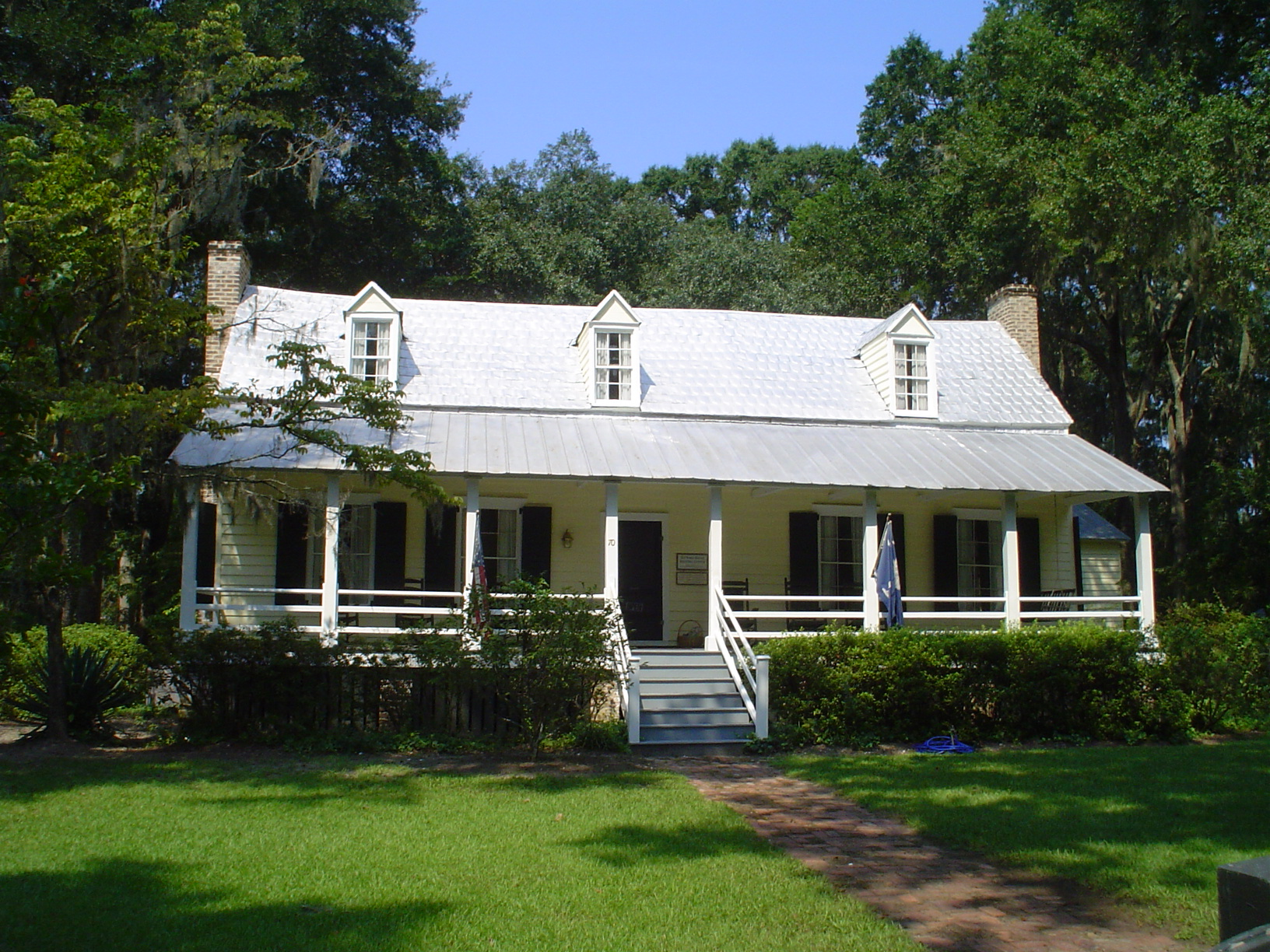
- The Heyward House, now the Welcome Center of Bluffton, South Carolina
- Interactive map of the The Heyward House area

General information
- Type: House
- Architectural style: Carolina Farmhouse
- Location: 70 Boundary St., Bluffton, South Carolina, United States
- Coordinates: 32.2331°N 80.8618°W
- Opened: 1840
- Owner: Bluffton Historical Preservation Society

The Heyward House, is located in Bluffton, South Carolina. It was built in 1841 in the early Carolina Farmhouse style brought to North America by enslaved laborers from the West Indies. The north parlor and the bedroom above, were the first parts of the house built by John J. Cole and the enslaved workers in the early 1840s as a summer home for his wife Carolina Corley and their children. John J. Cole's plantation was approximately 10 miles from downtown Bluffton. His father-in-law owned Moreland Plantation, located on present day Palmetto Bluff. By 1860, Cole had more than doubled the size of the house and his family, at which time the front and side windows in the front rooms were replaced with larger windows. The original parlor windows were reused in the dining room and back bedroom. The interior is clad with wide heart pine boards.

The last remaining slave cabin in Bluffton still stands on the property.

The original unattached summer kitchen was moved to the rear of the property when a large square attached kitchen was added to the main house in the 1930s. Beetles damaged the original summer kitchen and the structure was reconstructed with original and new wood.

Following the Civil War, Mr. Cole who had contracted tuberculosis during his service, died. The Cole family sold their holdings in Bluffton and moved to Texas in 1874. Mrs. Kate Du Bois, wife of the federally appointed Post Master, purchased the property then sold it in 1882 to Mrs. George Cuthbert Heyward, Sr. and it remained in the Heyward family until its purchase in 1998 by the Bluffton Historical Preservation Society. It is now preserved and open to the public as the town's only house museum and has been designated as the official welcome center for the Town of Bluffton.
