= Cordery =

Cordery is a surname. Notable people with the surname include:

- Hugh Sherwood Cordery (1880–1973), New Zealand customs official
- Richard Cordery, British actor
- Violette Cordery (1900–1983), British racing driver

== See also ==
- Corddry
- Corderoy
