= Corddry =

Corddry is a surname. Notable people with the surname include:

- Nate Corddry (b. 1977), American actor and comedian
- Rob Corddry (b. 1971), American actor and comedian

== See also ==
- Corday
- Corderoy
- Cordery
- Cordray
