= Planters Mercantile =

Store in South Carolina, USA

Coordinates: 32.2359°N 80.8624°W

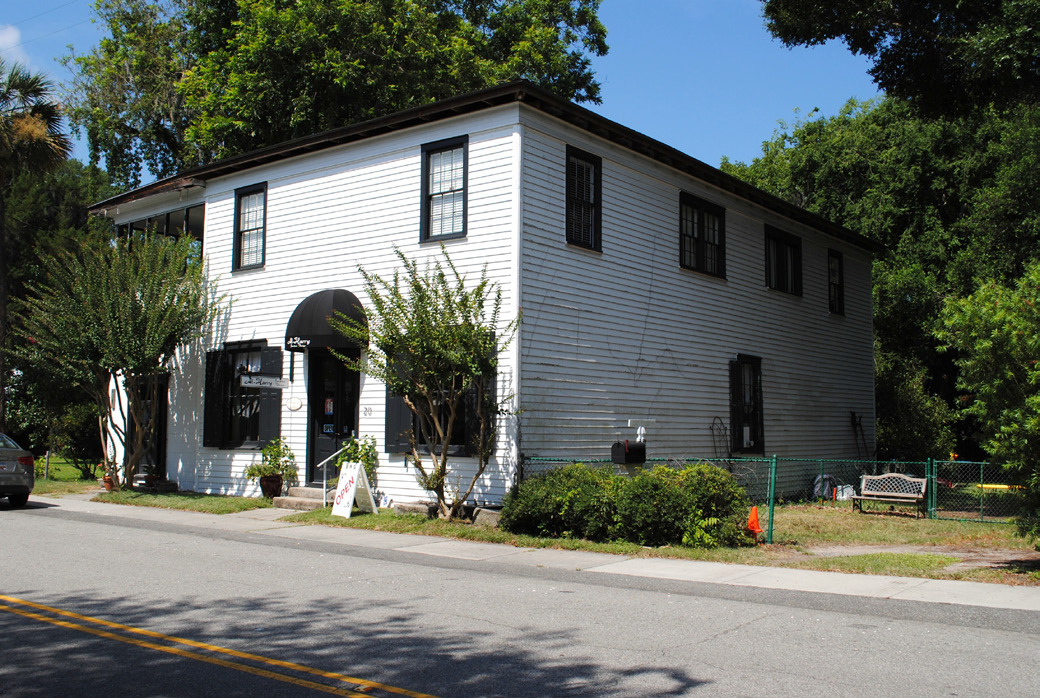
The Planters Mercantile

The Planters Mercantile is located in Bluffton, South Carolina. Built in 1890, it differs from most 19th-century commercial buildings on Calhoun Street because it has two full stories; the ground-floor store has very high ceilings and tall windows and entry doors. According to the company's bill head, the business offered clothing, dry goods, boots, shoes, hats, groceries, furniture, wagons, buggies, harnesses, sewing machines, trunks, satchels, cigars, feed, grits, flour, boat supplies, coffins, and fixtures.

Following the early and possibly accidental death of Abram, Moses sold the entire property to Julius Ulman and J. Weitz in 1920. In 1930 the building was purchased by Paul J. Viens. It then passed back and forth between the Viens and Pinckneys, during which time a Mr. Goodman operated a store there. After his death, Morris Robinowich kept store there until 1972. Since then, many individuals and groups have operated business in the space.
