= Kitty Ferguson =

American science writer and lecturer (born 1941)

Kitty Gail Ferguson
- Born: Kitty Vetter; 16 December 1941 (age 84); San Antonio, Texas, US
- Occupations: Science writer; lecturer; professional musician
- Website: http://kitty-ferguson.com/

Kitty Gail Ferguson (née Vetter, born December 16, 1941) is an American science writer, lecturer, and former professional musician.

She has written several science books for lay persons and youth, including books on biographical facts and the social background in which scientific developments have taken place. Her best-known books include biographical works about Stephen Hawking; Tycho Brahe and Johannes Kepler; and the ancient mathematician and philosopher Pythagoras.

== Early life, education and music ==
Ferguson, the daughter of musicians Herman and Prestyne Vetter, was born and spent her childhood in San Antonio, Texas. She grew up “surrounded by classical music, interesting discussions about religion and God, books, and science”. Her father shared his own enthusiasm about science with his family, and she developed an interest in astronomy and physics.

Ferguson studied music at the Juilliard School, earning her M.A. and B.A. degrees, and for twenty years she followed a career as a professional musician.

== Writer and lecturer ==
Spending a year in England while her husband, Yale H. Ferguson, took a sabbatical from Rutgers University as a Visiting Fellow at Cambridge University, Ferguson rekindled her early passion for science. She met Stephen Hawking the first time after asking him for an interview while she was writing her first book Black Holes in Spacetime, intended for children, and later wrote his biography Stephen Hawking: Quest for a Theory of Everything. Hawking, in turn, later consulted her for his own book The Universe in a Nutshell. In Cambridge, Ferguson met further renowned scientists including the physicist Brian Pippard.

After her return to the United States, she wrote her highly successful books on science. Her book Stephen Hawking: Quest for a Theory of Everything, published 1991, became a Sunday Times bestseller. At the occasion of Hawking's 70th birthday, she published a second book on his life. A year after his death, she published a third.

Ferguson's works are recognized for their degree of detail and accuracy. She is known for her ability to explain even complicated scientific concepts in ways that are understandable to the general public.

In The Fire in the Equations she summarizes two basic principles of the scientific method as follows:

- 1. All our theory, ideas, preconceptions, instincts, and prejudices about how things logically ought to be, how they in all fairness ought to be, or how we would prefer them to be, must be tested against external reality—what they really are. How do we determine what they really are? Through direct experience of the universe itself. […]
- 2. The testing, the experience, has to be public, repeatable—in the public domain. If the results are derived only once, if the experience is that of only one person and isn't available to others who attempt the same test or observation under approximately the same conditions, science must reject the findings as invalid—not necessarily false, but useless. One-time, private experience is not acceptable."

Ferguson emphasizes that religion and science need not stand in conflict with each other, and that it is important that the general public be aware of this. According to Ferguson, such awareness can be enhanced by letting people understand how scientific discovery takes place. She advocates educating people about science as a dynamic process of inquiry in which an established theory may be replaced by another theory if that new theory explains phenomena in a simpler way or if it explains them on a deeper, richer level than the earlier theory.

“I would like to free the science-loving public from small-minded scientific fideism that stifles creative imagination and spiritual development and often precipitates a loss of faith in science. I would like to free religion to make its impact – to fight its battles for human rights and dignity and a caring society and against illusion and despair – without having simultaneously to fight a rear-guard action against those who caricature it as standing to opposition to scientific knowledge and intellectual sophistication. I would like to wrest both science and religion from the dogmatists of scientific atheism and religious fundamentalism.”

This pragmatic stance inspired The Chairman Dances' song for Ferguson, entitled "Kitty Ferguson", which was included on their 2016 album, Time Without Measure.

Ferguson holds lectures to a wide range of audiences across North America.

== Personal facts ==
Ferguson currently lives in Bluffton, South Carolina, and Cambridge, England.

== Books ==
- Stephen Hawking: A Life Well Lived, Transworld, March 2019, {ISBN 978-1-784-16456-0}
- Lost Science: Tales of Forgotten Genius, Sterling, 2017, {ISBN 978-1-4549-1807-3}
- Stephen Hawking: An Unfettered Mind, Palgrave, 2012, ISBN 978-0230340602
- Pythagoras, Icon Books, Reprint March 2011, ISBN 978-1848312319 (first published by Walker Publishing Company, Inc., 2008)
- The music of Pythagoras: How an ancient brotherhood cracked the code of the universe and lit the path from antiquity to outer space, Walker, 2008, ISBN 978-0802716316
- Tycho and Kepler: The Unlikely Partnership That Forever Changed Our Understanding of the Heavens, Walker, 2004, ISBN 978-0802776884
- The Nobleman and His Housedog. Tycho Brahe and Johannes Kepler: the Strange Partnership that Revolutionised Science, Review (Publisher), 2002, ISBN 978-0747270225
- Measuring the Universe: Our Historic Quest to Chart the Horizons of Space and Time, Walker, 2000, ISBN 978-0802775924
- Prisons of Light – Black Holes, Cambridge University Press, Reprint February 1998, ISBN 978-0521625715 (first published 1996)
- The Fire in the Equations: Science, Religion, and the Search for God, Templeton Found Pr., New edition April 2004, ISBN 978-1932031676 (first published by Bantam Press, 1994)
- Stephen Hawking: Quest for a Theory of the Universe, F. Watts, 1991, ISBN 978-0531110676
- Black Holes in Spacetime, F. Watts, 1991, ISBN 978-0531125243
