= Carson Cottage =

Historic building in South Carolina, US

Coordinates: 32.2351°N 80.8626°W

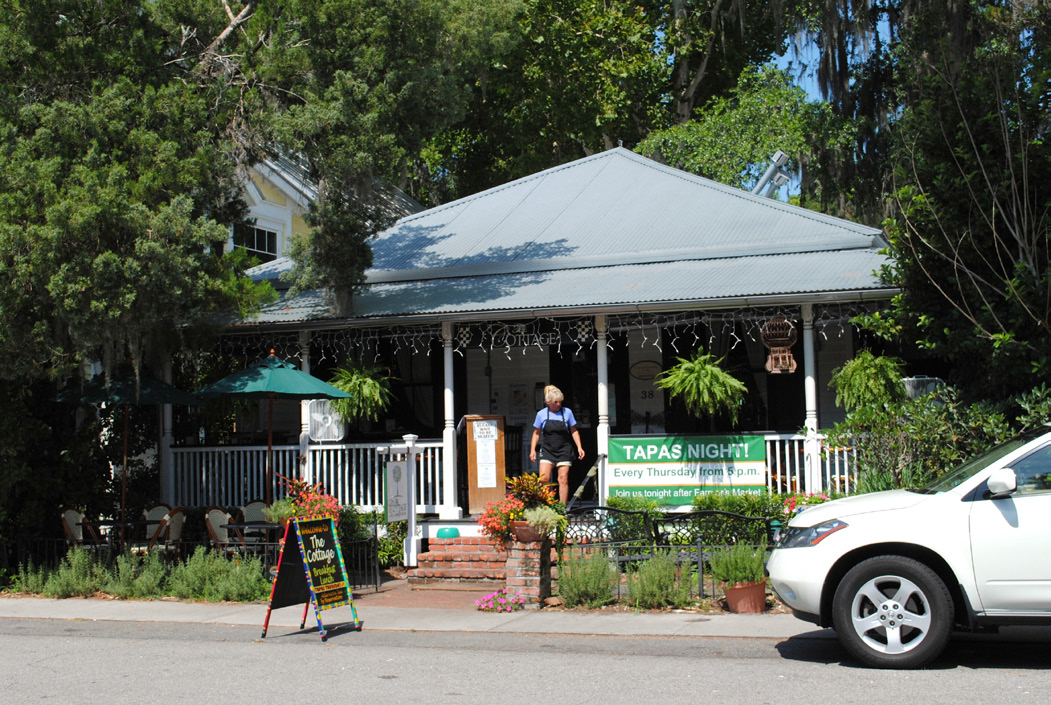
The Carson Cottage

Carson Cottage, built in 1890, is a historic building in Bluffton, South Carolina.

The first owner of Carson Cottage was J.J. Carson, a soldier in the Confederate Army who fought in the Battle of Chancellorsville during the American Civil War. In 1900, Carson organized the First Baptist Church of Bluffton and held services in the house until a church building was completed.

Carson Cottage is a one-story house on short piers with a front porch. The structure was recently moved forward and renovated.
