= Fripp-Lowden House =

House in Bluffton, South Carolina, U.S.

Coordinates: 32.2330°N 80.8632°W

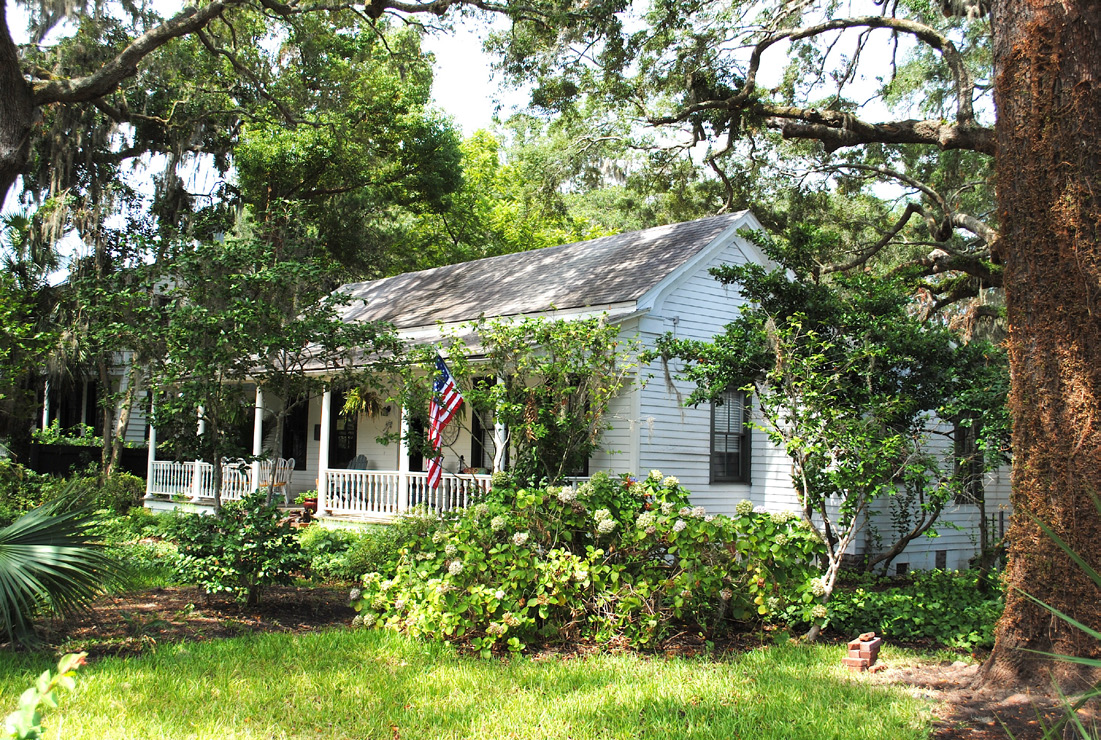
The Fripp-Lowden House

The Fripp-Lowden House is located in Bluffton, South Carolina. It was built in 1909. This Lowcountry cottage was built in 1909 for Alfred Fripp and his wife Sallie Williams. It is a one-story frame building of pine with a porch across the facade. It is surrounded by a garden that started by Mrs. Fripp, who raised camellias. "The Sallie Fripp" can be seen here when in bloom and is now in many Bluffton gardens. The Fripps' daughter, Mrs. H. O. Lowden, Jr., continued to expand the garden.

Today, Lynn Hicks is the current owner of The Fripp-Lowden House, and major renovations are currently being completed to preserve this beautiful historic property. In addition, the building houses the studio of the noted local artist and art professor Amiri Farris.

In 1915, Mr. Fripp erected a store on the corner of the property at Calhoun and Bridge streets and sold general merchandise of all varieties. That building was damaged by an out-of-control car and demolished in 1980.
