= Corderoy =

Corderoy is a surname. Notable people with the surname include:

- Anna Corderoy, British rowing coxswain (born 1994)
- Tracey Corderoy, British children's writer (born 1965)

== See also ==
- Corduroy – Durable woven fabric with warp-wise stripes of cut pile
- Corddry
- Cordero
- Cordery
- Cordray
