= Squire Pope Carriage House =

Coordinates: 32.2312°N 80.8630°W

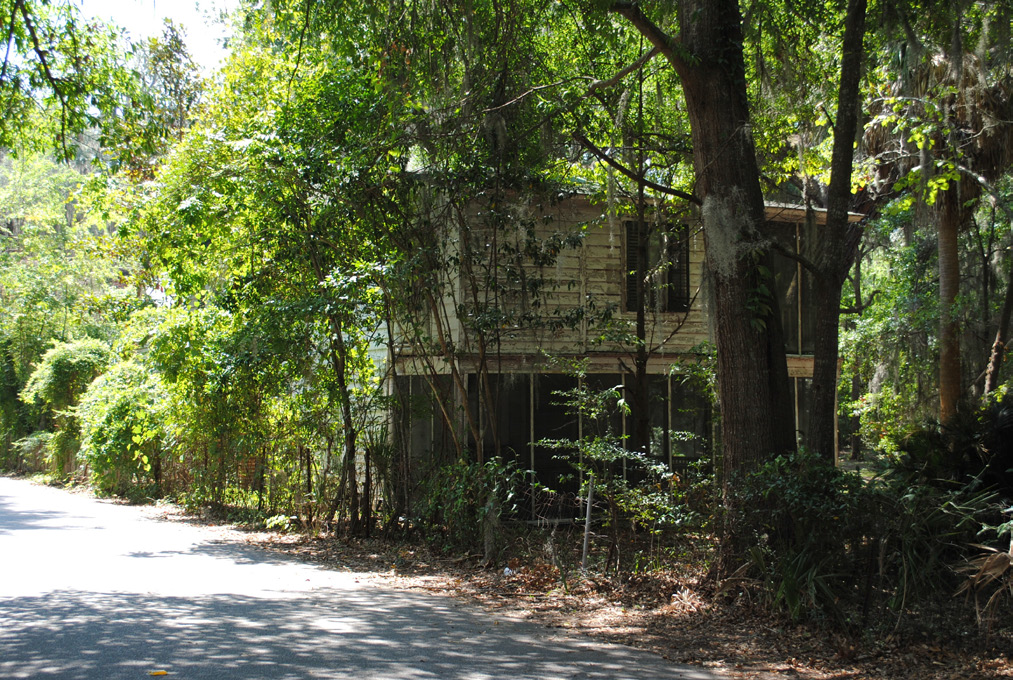
The Squire Pope Carriage House

The Squire Pope Carriage House, is a historic site located in Bluffton, South Carolina built in 1850. This two-story frame structure is located at the back of a deep lot overlooking the May River. In November 2019 the Bluffton Town Council approved a renovation project to fix structural concerns and preserve the site.

== History ==
The house originally served as the carriage house and outbuildings for the summer house of Squire William Pope. Pope was a wealthy landowner from Hilton Head Island who owned the Coggins Point Plantation. He served in the South Carolina Senate and represented St. Luke's Parrish in the SC House of Representatives. The main house was burned the day of the Burning of Bluffton. When the family returned following the Civil War, they joined these buildings together to serve as their home. The structure is one room deep with porches across the May River facade.
