= Altamaha Town =

Archaeological site in South Carolina, United States

- U.S. National Register of Historic Places
- Nearest city: Bluffton, South Carolina
- Area: 41 acres (17 ha)
- MPS: Yamasee Indian Towns in the South Carolina Low Country MPS
- NRHP reference No.: 93001479
- Added to NRHP: January 21, 1994

Altamaha Town is an archaeological site in the Bluffton, South Carolina area. It was the location of Altamaha, the head town of the Lower Towns of the Yamasee tribe during their entire 30 year presence in South Carolina. Evidence dates the beginning of this period from 1707–1715, though it is possible the town was formed as early as 1695. The area encompassed over 100 acres (40 ha) and 40 houses. There is also archaeological evidence to suggest that the site was also occupied intermittently prior to the arrival of the Yamasee, from at least 1500 BC to 1715 AD.

Altamaha was listed in the National Register of Historic Places on January 21, 1994.
