= Bluffton Today =

- The April 4, 2006 (1st anniversary edition) front page of Bluffton Today
- Format: Broadsheet
- Owner: Gannett
- Publisher: Michael Traynor
- Editor: Lawrence Conneff
- Founded: 2005
- Headquarters: 52 Persimmon Street; Bluffton, SC 29910; United States
- Circulation: 11,600 (as of 2018)
- Website: blufftontoday.com

Bluffton Today is a daily newspaper in Bluffton, South Carolina that integrates many elements of citizen journalism into its tight local focus. Some industry analysts regard the newspaper as a possible future model for small newspapers across the country. The paper prints in a tabloid format, which is unusual for a paper of its circulation size.

Morris Communications started the newspaper in 2005 after the company folded the Carolina Morning News, a wraparound of the Savannah Morning News.

Bluffton Today originally was a free daily newspaper, but on Dec. 1, 2008, it began charging 25 cents per copy (75 cents on Sundays). The publisher said the newspaper had to start charging because of rising newsprint costs and declining advertising revenue.

In 2017, Morris sold its newspapers to GateHouse Media
