= Bluffton, South Carolina =

- Town
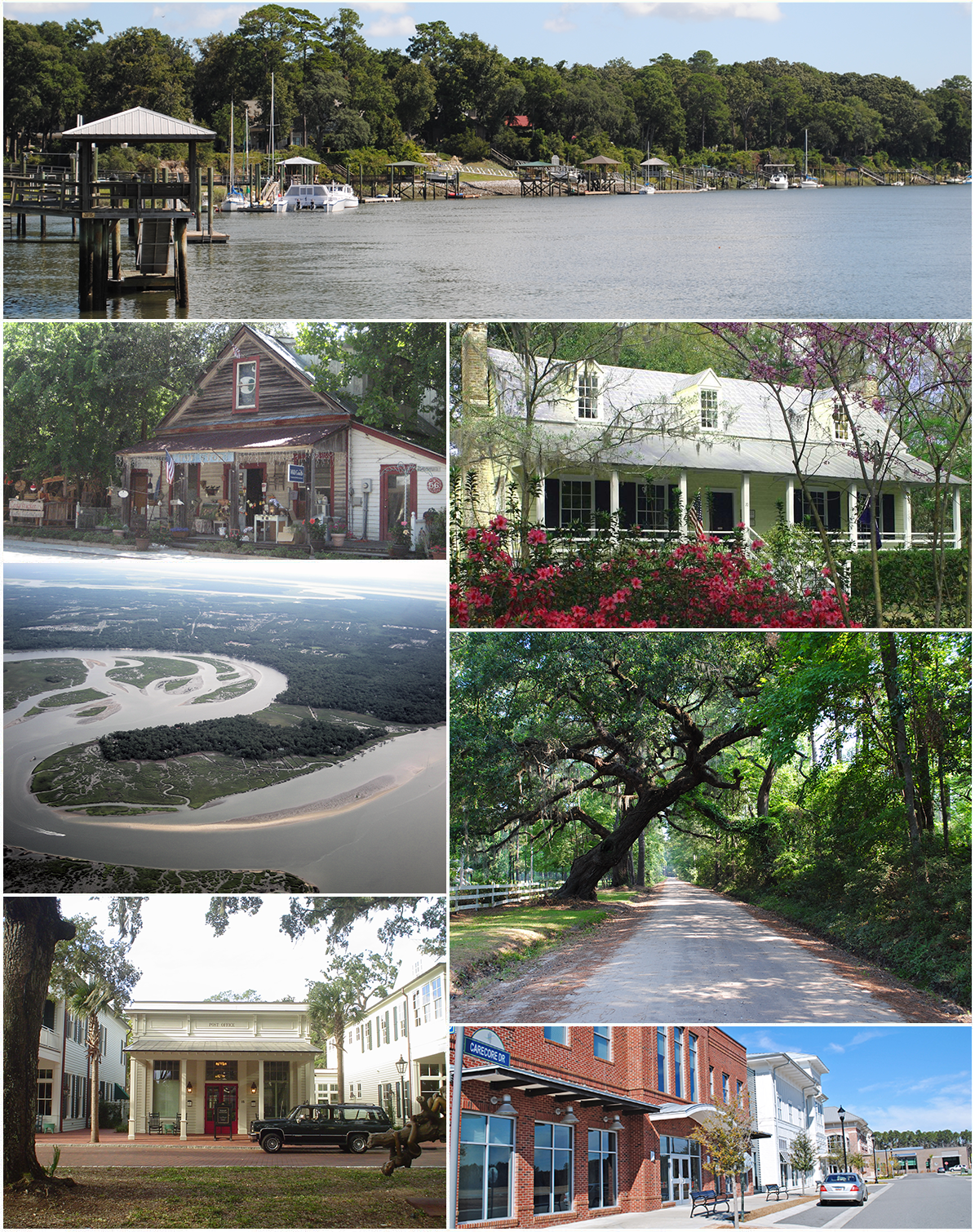
- Clockwise from top: May River, Heyward House, a gravel path, Carecore Drive, a post office, Myrtle Island, and The Store

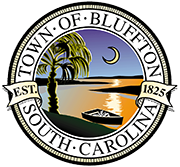
- Flag Seal Logo
- Nickname: Heart of the Lowcountry
- Motto: "A State of Mind"
- Interactive map of Bluffton, South Carolina
- Location within South Carolina Location within the United States
- Coordinates: 32°13′50″N 80°55′50″W
- Country: United States
- State: South Carolina
- Counties: Beaufort
- Settled: 1728
- Incorporated: 1852
- Named for: Original jurisdiction on a bluff above the May River

Government
  - Type: Council–manager
  - Body: Bluffton Town Council

Area
  - Town: 54.19 sq mi (140.36 km^{2})
  - Land: 51.97 sq mi (134.60 km^{2})
  - Water: 2.23 sq mi (5.77 km^{2}) 4.12%
- Elevation: 20 ft (6.1 m)

Population (2020)
  - Town: 27,716
  - Density: 533.3/sq mi (205.92/km^{2})
  - Urban: 71,824 (US: 395th)
  - Urban density: 1,136/sq mi (438.5/km^{2})
- Time zone: UTC−5 (EST)
  - Summer (DST): UTC−4 (EDT)
- ZIP codes: 29909-29910
- Area code: 843, 854
- FIPS code: 45-07210
- GNIS feature ID: 2405288
- Website: www.townofbluffton.sc.gov

Bluffton is a town in southern Beaufort County, South Carolina, United States. The population as of the 2020 census was 27,716, an increase of over 120% since the 2010 census, making it the 17th-most populous municipality and one of the fastest growing municipalities in South Carolina. It is primarily located around U.S. Route 278 between Hilton Head Island and Interstate 95. Bluffton is a principal town within the Hilton Head Island metropolitan area.

The Lowcountry town's original one square mile area, now known as Old Town, is situated on a bluff along the May River. After the Tariff of 1842, Bluffton became a hotbed of separatist sentiment, which in turn led to a protest against federal taxes called the Bluffton Movement in 1844. Even though the movement quickly died out, it somewhat contributed to the secession movement that led to South Carolina being the first state to leave the Union. In the Antebellum Period, Bluffton became a popular location for wealthy merchants and plantation owners. During the Civil War, two thirds of the town was destroyed by fire during the Union's Bluffton Expedition on June 4, 1863.

== History ==
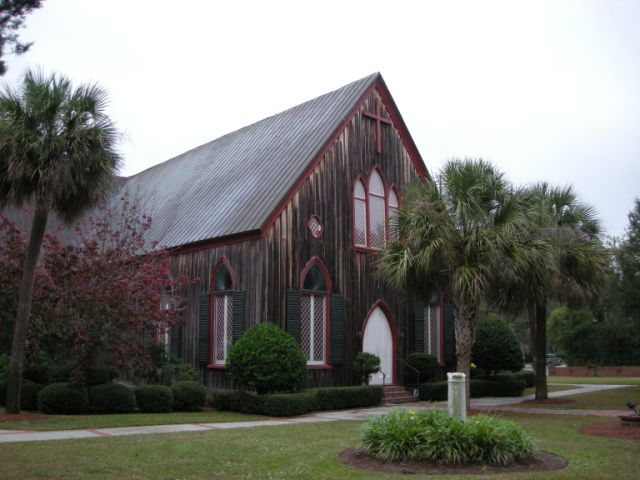
Church of the Cross

=== Colonial era (1670–1776) ===
During the 17th and the 18th centuries, the area comprising southern Beaufort County was known as Granville County of St. Luke's Parish. The Yamasee people were invited to settle in the area by Lord Cardoss, leader of the nearby Scottish settlement in Beaufort. The Yamasee established ten towns with over 1,200 inhabitants in the area. In 1715, the Yamasee War broke out, and after several years of fighting, the Yamasee migrated to Florida, opening the "Indian Lands" to European settlement. In 1718, the Lords Proprietors carved the area into several new baronies, including the Devil's Elbow Barony that contained the future town of Bluffton. The first titled owner of the land was the Barbadian planter Sir John Colleton. Following the departure of the Yamasee people, colonists began building plantations in the Bluffton area in 1728. The Colletons prospered by growing cotton, corn and indigo.

=== American Revolution (1776–1785) ===
Before his death in 1776, Sir John Colleton (grandson of the original owner) developed plantations near Victoria Bluff - Foot Point areas and later disposed of much of his barony, much of it bought by the Rose and Kirk families. These plantations were destroyed by the British under General Prevost in 1779. During the 18th century, much of the land south of the May River (now known as Palmetto Bluff) was covered with rice fields. Rice became a lucrative crop and a part of lowcountry culture until the early 20th century when it was disrupted by a series of devastating storms.

=== Antebellum era (1785–1861) ===
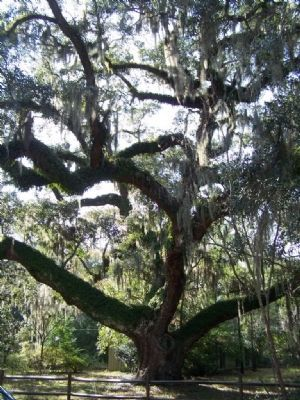
This 350- to 400-year-old live oak tree, known as the "Secession Oak", is where Robert Barnwell Rhett called for the South to withdraw from the Union in 1844.

The town of Bluffton was eventually built on two adjoining parcels in the Devil's Elbow Barony purchased by Benjamin Walls and James Kirk. The first homes were constructed during the early 1800s by area plantation owners seeking the high ground and cool river breezes as an escape from the unhealthy conditions present on Lowcountry rice and cotton plantations. Easy access by water provided more incentive for expansion, and the many tidal coves afforded excellent locations for residences. The community was originally known as "Kirk's Landing" or "Kirk's Bluff" as shown in Mill's Atlas of 1825. The first streets were formally laid out during the 1830s and the name of Bluffton decided upon in the early 1840s as a compromise between the Kirk and Pope families.

The first South Carolina secession movement began under what is now known as the Secession Oak tree, led by Robert Barnwell Rhett on July 31, 1844. In the 1850s, a steamboat landing was built at the end of Calhoun Street, and Bluffton became the commercial center of southern Beaufort County as a stopover for travelers between Savannah and Beaufort. In 1852, the town was officially incorporated by an act of the South Carolina General Assembly and comprised approximately one square mile. The iconic Church of the Cross was designed by architect Edward Brickell White to seat up to 600 parishioners at a cost of $5,000, and construction began in 1854. On July 17, 1857, the first services were held at the Church of the Cross.

=== Civil War and postbellum era (1861–1945) ===
After a Union victory at the Battle of Port Royal on November 7, 1861, Confederate Brigadier-General Thomas F. Drayton directed the evacuation of rebel forces from Hilton Head Island to the Bluffton mainland. Occupying Port Royal Harbor, the Union's South Atlantic Blockading Squadron could then be monitored from rebel lookouts dispersed from Bluffton's substantial picket headquarters. Bluffton's location resulted in it being the only strategic position on the East Coast at which the Confederates could gather direct intelligence on the Union squadron that was conducting crucial blockade operations along the southern coastline. In late May 1863, Major-General David Hunter, Commander of the Department of the South, ordered the destruction of Bluffton by fire. The Union "Expedition against Bluffton" was carried out on June 4, 1863, destroying approximately two thirds of the town's estimated 60 structures. Only the town's two churches and fifteen residences remained standing after the attack. Eight antebellum homes and two churches still exist in Old Town and highlight the town's nationally popular registered historic district.

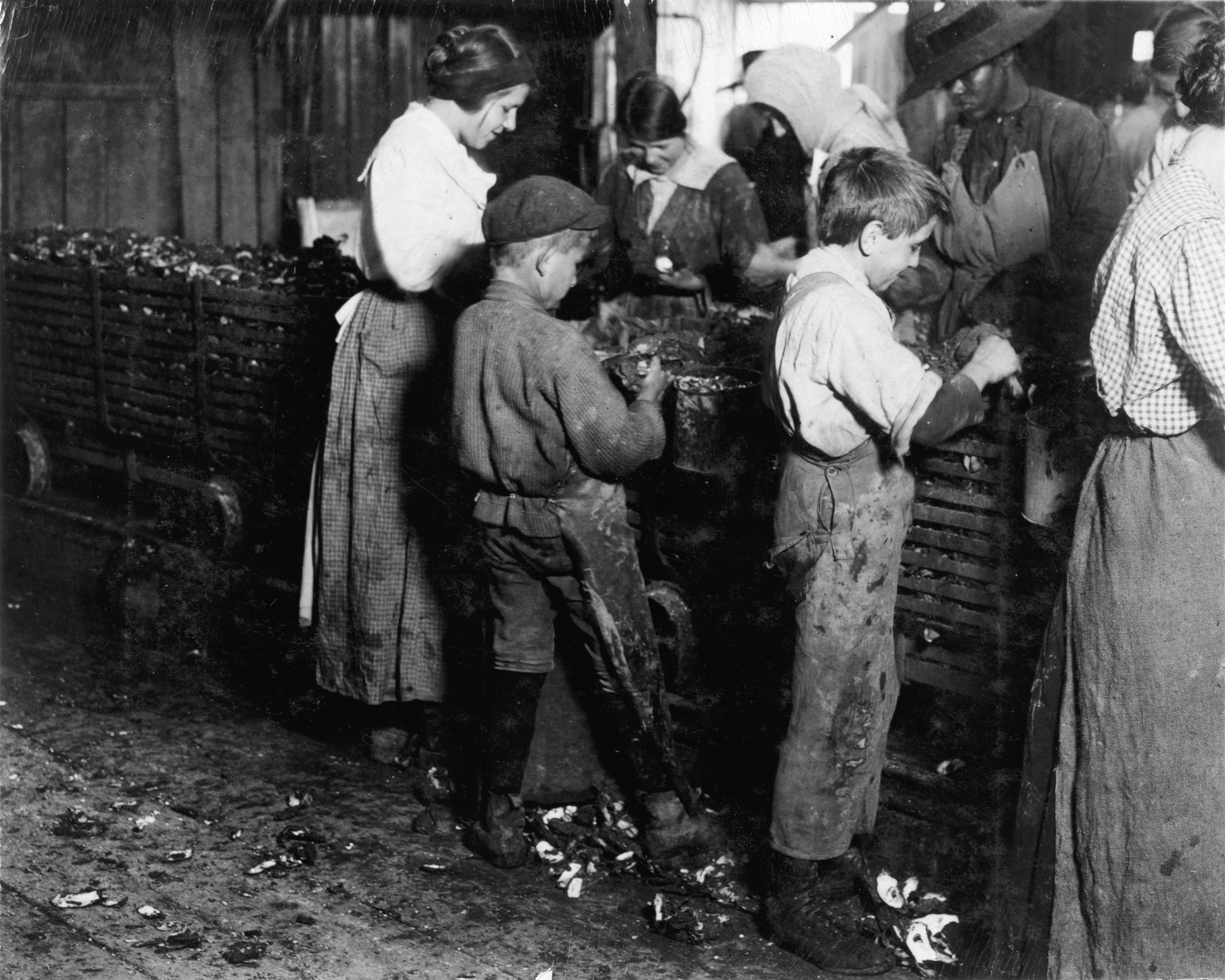
Child labor at Varn & Platt Canning Company in Bluffton, 1913. Photo by Lewis Hine.

Rebuilding came slowly, as few local landowners could still afford the luxury of a summer home in Bluffton. The town did not experience a true rebuilding until the 1880s, when it emerged as a commercial center for Beaufort County.

=== Contemporary era (1945–present) ===
Bluffton remained a commercial center until Coastal Highway (US 17) and the bridge at Port Wentworth over the Savannah River were completed, which made riverboat trade and travel less attractive. The Great Depression began shortly thereafter and brought the closure of the town's prosperity and commercial importance. The popularity of Bluffton as a vacation spot remained even after its loss of commercial stature.

The development of Hilton Head Island, nearby Sun City and the related development in the 1990s caused a resurgence of commercial activity in the town. In 1996, Bluffton was designated a National Historic District with 46 contributing buildings and two contributing sites. In 1998, the Heyward House opened to the public by the Bluffton Historical Preservation Society. In 1999, the Heyward House was part of the Save America's Treasures program. The Heyward House became the town's welcome center in 2000, and the Old Town Bluffton historic district was established through zoning regulations and architectural standards. In 2005, Bluffton was recognized as a Preserve America Community, a federal program that encourages community efforts to preserve the nation's cultural and historical assets.

Altamaha Town, Bluffton Historic District, Church of the Cross, and Rose Hill Plantation House are listed on the National Register of Historic Places.

== Geography ==
Bluffton was once mostly wetlands, many of which were drained possibly during the antebellum era. Agriculture and pine timber harvesting contributed to the landscape still present today. The town proper consists of five primary areas. The historic district of Old Town, on the northern bluff of the May River; Palmetto Bluff, located on the southern side of the May River; Jones Estate, situated along the New River; Buckwalter, located on the northwest side of town; and Shultz Tract, north of Old Town. The May River winds through the center of town. The New River forms the southwest boundary of the town.

=== Topography ===
According to the United States Census Bureau, the town has a total area of 54.19 square miles (140.4 km^{2}), of which 51.97 square miles (134.6 km^{2}) is land and 2.23 square miles (5.8 km^{2}) (4.12%) is water. Bluffton is the fifth largest municipality in South Carolina by land area. The municipal boundary contains many large "doughnut holes" of unincorporated territory due to South Carolina's strict annexation laws. Most of Bluffton was undeveloped land until the housing boom of the early 2000s, which led to explosive growth in Bluffton's area. Many of Bluffton's planned unit developments were built during this time. By 2012, many of these developments remained only partially complete due to the Great Recession.

=== Climate ===
Bluffton has a humid subtropical climate (Köppen Cfa), with very mild winters, hot, humid summers, and significant rainfall all year long. August is the wettest month; almost half of the annual rainfall occurs during the summer months in the form of thundershowers. Fall remains relatively warm through November. Winter is short and mild, and is characterized by occasional rain. Snow flurries rarely occur. The highest temperature recorded was 107 °F (42 °C), in 1986, and the lowest temperature recorded was 4 °F (−16 °C) on January 21, 1985. Hurricanes are a major threat to the area during the summer and early fall but there has not been a major hurricane event in Bluffton since the Category 3 Sea Islands Hurricane in 1893.

Climate data for Bluffton, South Carolina
Month	Jan	Feb	Mar	Apr	May	Jun	Jul	Aug	Sep	Oct	Nov	Dec	Year
Record high °F (°C)	85 (29)	84 (29)	90 (32)	95 (35)	99 (37)	101 (38)	107 (42)	103 (39)	98 (37)	97 (36)	88 (31)	83 (28)	107 (42)
Mean daily maximum °F (°C)	60 (16)	63 (17)	70 (21)	75 (24)	82 (28)	86 (30)	90 (32)	88 (31)	84 (29)	78 (26)	70 (21)	64 (18)	76 (24)
Mean daily minimum °F (°C)	40 (4)	43 (6)	49 (9)	55 (13)	63 (17)	71 (22)	74 (23)	73 (23)	69 (21)	59 (15)	50 (10)	43 (6)	57 (14)
Record low °F (°C)	4 (−16)	15 (−9)	21 (−6)	32 (0)	37 (3)	45 (7)	50 (10)	53 (12)	46 (8)	32 (0)	23 (−5)	10 (−12)	4 (−16)
Average precipitation inches (mm)	3.97 (101)	3.31 (84)	3.43 (87)	3.15 (80)	1.97 (50)	4.50 (114)	6.31 (160)	7.63 (194)	5.82 (148)	4.61 (117)	2.59 (66)	3.11 (79)	50.4 (1,280)
Source: The Weather Channel

== Demographics ==
Historical population
Census	Pop.	Note	%±
1880	170		—
1910	577		—
1920	480		−16.8%
1930	570		18.8%
1940	459		−19.5%
1950	474		3.3%
1960	356		−24.9%
1970	529		48.6%
1980	541		2.3%
1990	738		36.4%
2000	1,275		72.8%
2010	12,530		882.7%
2020	27,716		121.2%
2025 (est.)	36,807	▲	32.8%
U.S. Decennial Census

=== 2020 census ===
As of the 2020 census, there were 27,716 people, 7,560 households, and 5,402 families residing in the town. The median age was 40.5 years. 24.6% of residents were under the age of 18 and 19.0% of residents were 65 years of age or older. For every 100 females there were 92.4 males, and for every 100 females age 18 and over there were 88.4 males age 18 and over.

91.4% of residents lived in urban areas, while 8.6% lived in rural areas.

There were 10,211 households in Bluffton, of which 36.4% had children under the age of 18 living in them. Of all households, 64.3% were married-couple households, 9.7% were households with a male householder and no spouse or partner present, and 20.3% were households with a female householder and no spouse or partner present. About 16.3% of all households were made up of individuals and 6.2% had someone living alone who was 65 years of age or older.

There were 11,282 housing units, of which 9.5% were vacant. The homeowner vacancy rate was 1.8% and the rental vacancy rate was 10.5%.

Bluffton racial composition
Race	Num.	Perc.
White (non-Hispanic)	19,573	70.62%
Black or African American (non-Hispanic)	2,284	8.24%
Native American	61	0.22%
Asian	571	2.06%
Pacific Islander	10	0.04%
Other/Mixed	1,169	4.22%
Hispanic or Latino	4,048	14.61%

=== 2010 census ===
At the 2010 census, there were 12,530 people, 4,417 households, and 3,323 families residing in the town, on a land area of 51.3 square miles (133 km^{2}). The population density was 244.2 inhabitants per square mile (94.3/km^{2}). There were 5,393 housing units at an average density of 105.1 per square mile (40.6/km^{2}).

The town of Bluffton grew 882.7% between the 2000 and 2010 census, making it the fastest growing municipality in South Carolina with a population over 2,500. Housing units grew 976.4%.

The racial makeup of the town was 71.4% White, 16.1% African American, 0.3% Native American, 2.0% Asian, <0.1% Pacific Islander, 7.3% from other races, and 2.9% from two or more races. Hispanic or Latino of any race were 18.8% of the population.

There were 4,417 households, out of which 54.0% had children under the age of 18 living with them, 61.9% were married couples living together, 13.3% had a female householder with no husband present, and 26.4% were non-families. 18.4% of all households were made up of individuals, and 4.1% had someone living alone who was 65 years of age or older. The average household size was 2.84 and the average family size was 3.20.

In the town, the population was spread out, with 28.9% under the age of 18, 6.8% from 18 to 24, 35.5% from 25 to 44, 21.5% from 45 to 64, and 7.3% who were 65 years of age or older. The median age was 32.7 years. For every 100 females, there were 95.5 males. For every 100 females age 18 and over, there were 93.4 males. Estimated household income for 2009 was $53,386, the estimated median house value was $237,868, median gross rent was $1,179.

Bluffton is a principal city in the Hilton Head Island-Bluffton-Port Royal, SC Metropolitan Statistical Area, which includes Beaufort and Jasper counties. In 2014, the MSA had an estimated year-round population of 203,022.

== Economy ==
Long a stopover between Hilton Head and Savannah, Bluffton has become a tourist destination in its own right with a large number of hotels, restaurants and shopping areas such as Tanger Outlets. The Inn at Palmetto Bluff has received a number of awards including Best Hotel in the Country by U.S. News & World Report and Condé Nast Traveler Gold List World's Best Places to Stay, January 2011. Higher education is an important sector in the local economy, with institutions such as the University of South Carolina Beaufort Hilton Head Gateway Campus and Technical College of the Lowcountry nearby. An eclectic art destination, Bluffton has several art galleries located along Calhoun Street. Bluffton is home to South Carolina's last full-time oyster shucking business, Bluffton Oyster Co, which first opened in 1899 at the end of Wharf Street on the banks of the May River.

== Arts and culture ==
=== Society of Bluffton Artists ===
The Society of Bluffton Artists is a nonprofit organization established in 1999.

=== May River Theatre ===
The May River Theatre is a theatre company that has performances at the Ulmer Auditorium in downtown Bluffton.

=== Annual events ===
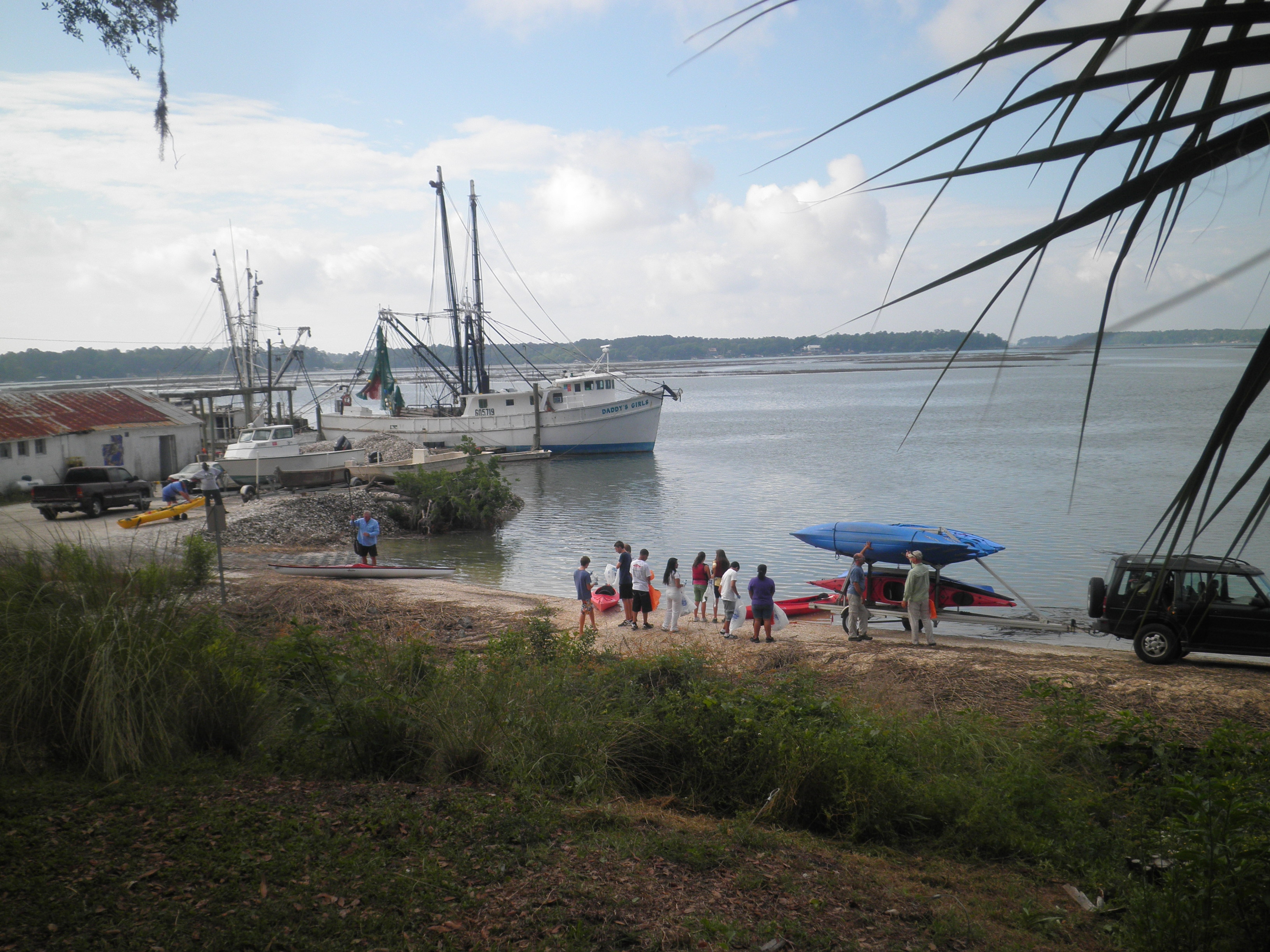
May River Cleanup

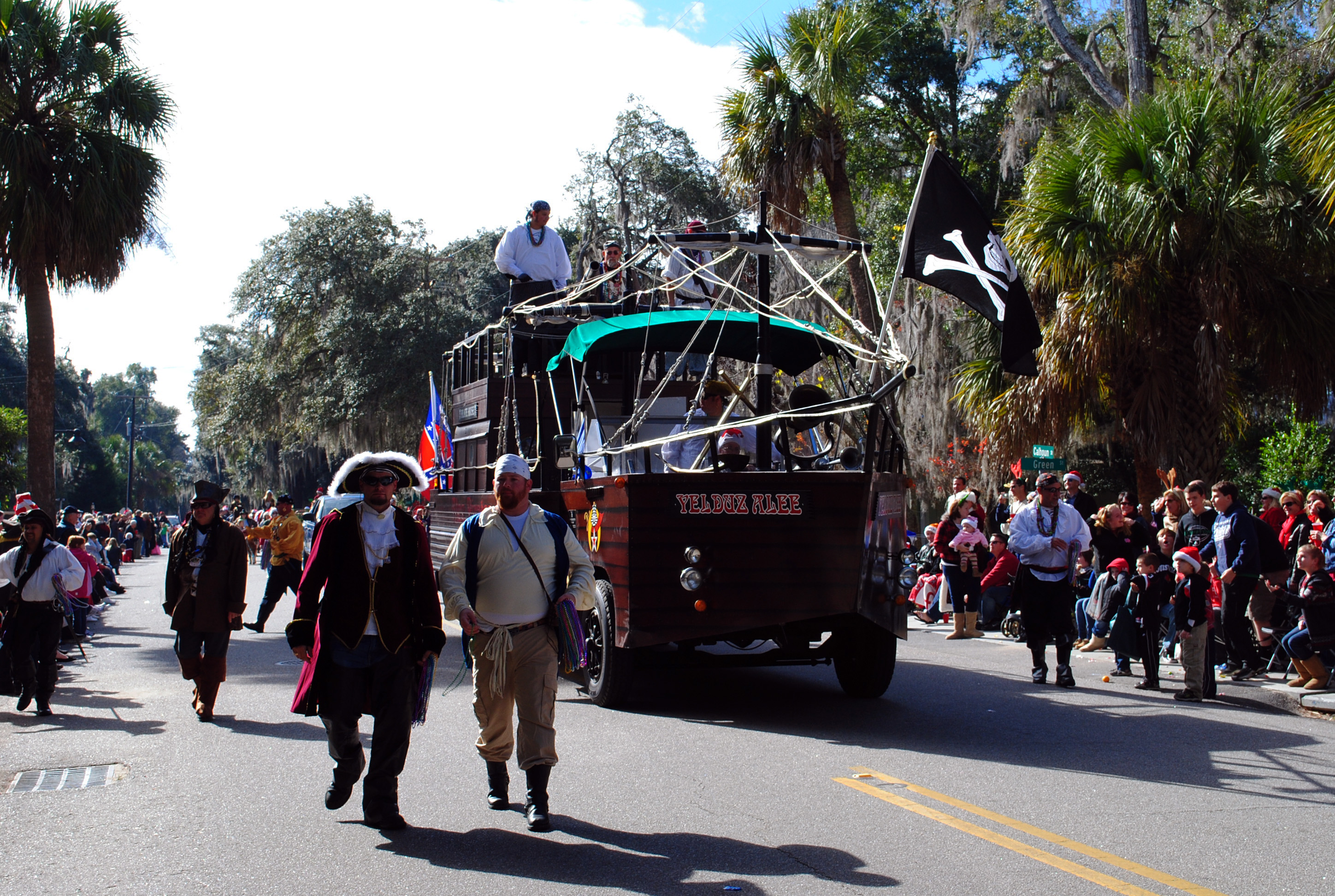
Christmas Parade

- Bluffton Village Festival – Also known as "Mayfest", the Bluffton Village Festival is an annual event that started in the spring of 1978. It gathers local artisans and musicians to showcase a variety of goods as a "celebration of Bluffton life" and local culture.
- Christmas Parade – An annual parade that takes place at the beginning of December and features a wide variety of unique parade floats both local and regional.
- Historic Bluffton Arts & Seafood Festival – A fall festival that consists of many events and activities including an art show, kayak tours, a 5K run, and sampling of locally harvested seafood.
- Shag & Drag – Classic car show and live entertainment, held in June.
- May River Cleanup – Every year hundreds of volunteers organize to help remove trash and waste from nearly 12 miles of river and to help raise awareness of the challenges facing the May River.

=== Museums, historical sites and other attractions ===
Historic buildings, art and historical museums include:

- Heyward House and Historical Center
- Church of the Cross
- Squire Pope Carriage House
- Allen-Lockwood House
- Huger-Gordon House
- Seven Oaks, Bluffton SC
- Fripp-Lowden House
- The Store, Bluffton SC
- Carson Cottage
- D. Hasell Heyward House
- Patz Brothers House
- Planters Mercantile
- Cordray House
- Campbell Chapel African Methodist Episcopal Church
- Garvin/Garvey House
- Joiner Home
- Nathaniel Brown Cottage

== Parks and recreation ==
Bluffton has many parks and recreational activities. For cycling, Bluffton Parkway and Buckwalter Parkway have bicycle paths on both sides of the road and Bluffton Rd has a bicycle lane from US-278 until the intersection with May River Rd. The following links will display the location of the park in an external web mapping application.

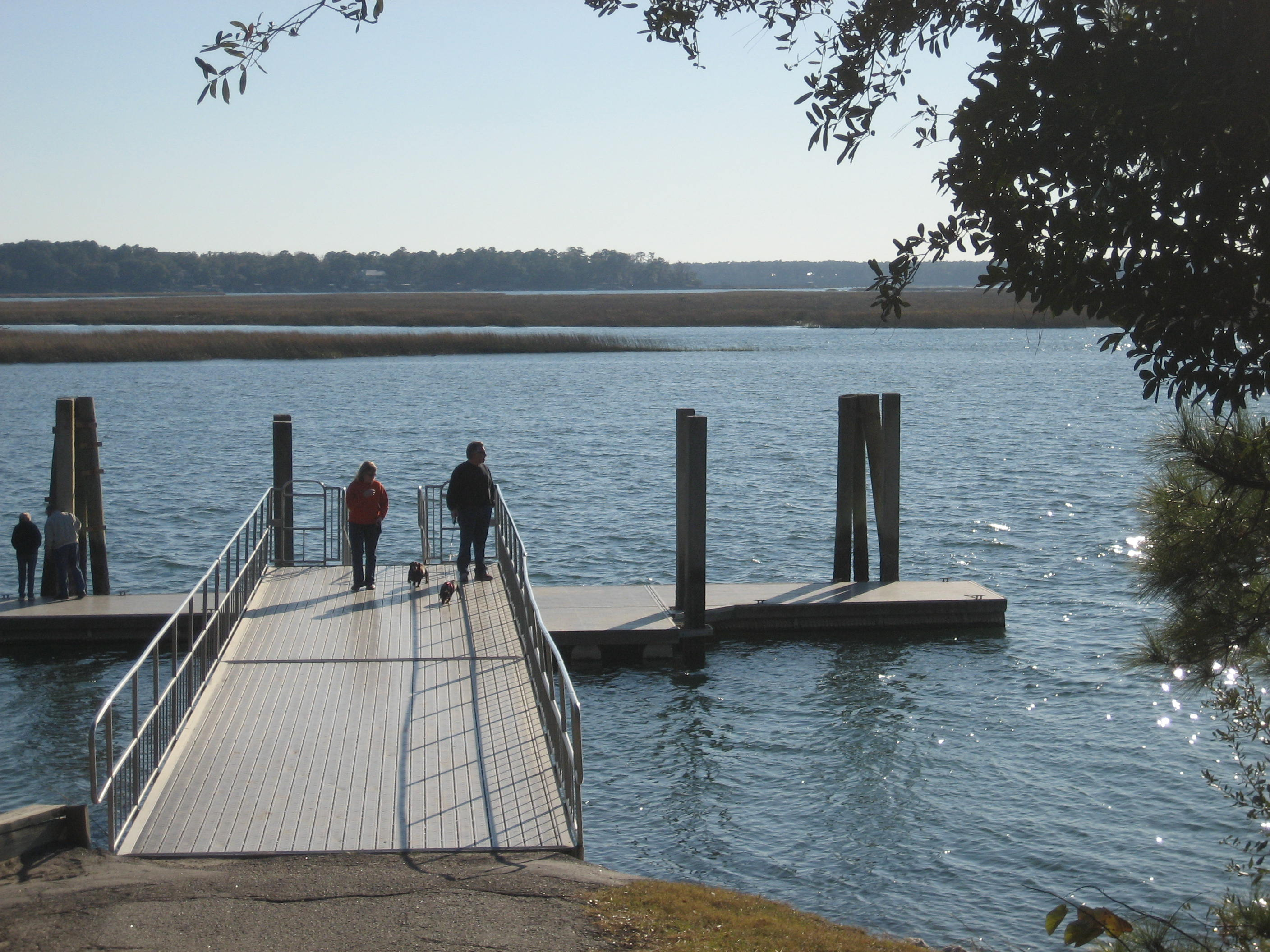
Calhoun St Boat Dock

- Beaufort County Parks & Recreation Bluffton Pool – Indoor swimming pool with lanes
- Buckwalter Regional Park – Soccer fields and skateboard park
- Buckwalter Trail – Wraps around Buckwalter Place
- DuBois Park – Playground and swings
- Martin Family Park - passive park space
- New River Trailhead Park – Nature trail
- New Riverside Park - park space, playground, event space
- MC Riley Sports Complex – Basketball and baseball
- Oscar Frazier Park – Playground, soccer fields and baseball parks
- Oyster Factory Park
- Pritchard Pocket Park
- Stock Farm Pocket Park
- Wright Family Park - passive park space overlooking May River
- Bluffton Recreation Center – Tennis, soccer, youth football, playground

=== Boat landings ===
- Oyster Factory Boat Landing – Access to the May River
- H.E. Trask Boat Landing – Access to the Colleton River
- Calhoun St. Boat Dock – Access to the May River
- Alljoy Boat Landing – Access to the May River

== Government ==
Bluffton has a Council–manager form of government. The Bluffton Town Council is responsible for the legislative function of the municipality such as establishing policy, passing local ordinances, voting appropriations, and developing an overall vision. The town has a mayor and mayor pro tem position. The Council has four at-large members who serve overlapping four-year terms. Town elections take place every two years in the fall.

== Education ==
Bluffton is served by the Beaufort County School District. The local public schools include:

- Bluffton Elementary School
- Bluffton High School
- Bluffton Middle School
- H.E. McCracken Middle School
- May River High School
- M.C. Riley Elementary School
- Okatie Elementary
- Pritchardville Elementary School
- Red Cedar Elementary School
- River Ridge Academy

There are also a number of independent schools, including Cross Schools (K-12), May River Montessori (K-5), Hilton Head Christian Academy (K-12) and Saint Gregory the Great Catholic School (K-8). Public institutions of higher education in Bluffton include the University of South Carolina Beaufort South Campus and the Technical College of the Lowcountry.

Bluffton has a public library, a branch of the Beaufort County Library.

== Infrastructure ==
=== Transportation ===
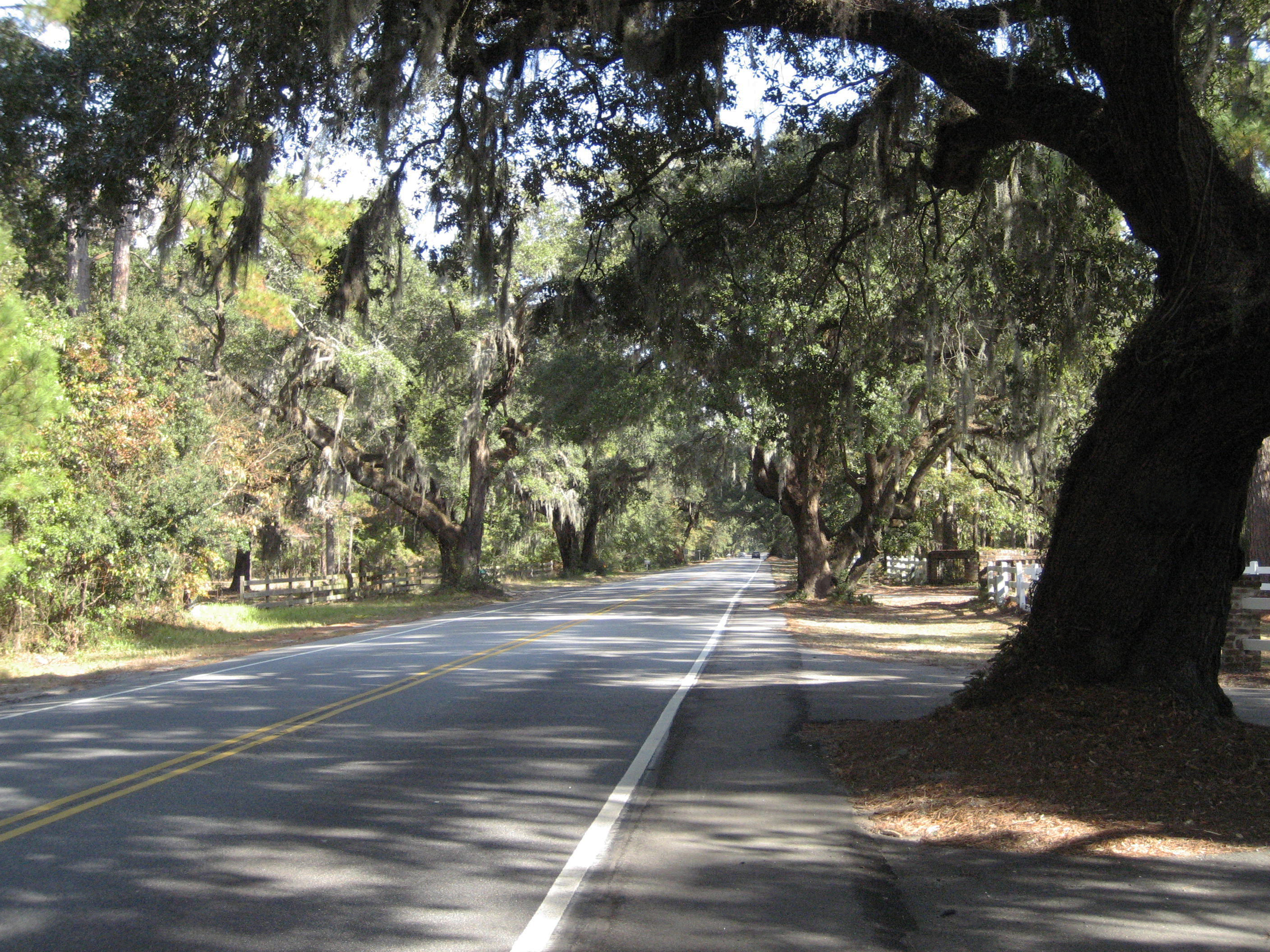
May River Road

Bluffton is served by the Savannah/Hilton Head International Airport, which is located in Savannah, Georgia, and the Hilton Head Island Airport.

Interstate 95 runs to the west of Bluffton and is connected to it by U.S. Route 278. Bluffton Parkway, currently under construction, is planned to run from the Hilton Head Island bridge to I-95 near Hardeeville when all phases are complete. As of August 2012, the parkway runs from SC-170 in the west almost to the bridge in the east. Two sections are currently separated by Buckwalter Parkway but are scheduled to be joined by Phase 5B. Local public transportation and dial-a-ride service is provided by Palmetto Breeze, a regional transportation authority run by the Lowcountry Council of Governments, which serves as the regional Metropolitan Planning Organization (MPO).

Major highways in the town include:

- I-95 (west of Bluffton)
- US 278 - Fording Island Road
- SC 46 - May River Road
- SC 170 - Okatie Highway
- Bluffton Parkway

=== Emergency services ===
The Bluffton Township Fire District was created in 1978, and comprises all of the land in Beaufort County south of the Broad River except Hilton Head Island and Daufuskie Island. In 1994, Jenkins Island was added. There are nine fire stations in the Bluffton Township Fire District.

Bluffton Township Fire District works with Hilton Head Island Fire & Rescue as a sponsoring agency for two of South Carolina's designated special teams: one of the state's Hazardous Materials/Weapons of Mass Destruction Response Teams and one of the four Regional Urban Search and Rescue Response Teams.

The Town of Bluffton Police Department received national accreditation in 2009. There is one police headquarters, providing operations, support, and neighborhood services.

=== Utilities ===
Water and sewer service is provided by Beaufort-Jasper Water and Sewer Authority (BJWSA). South Carolina Electric and Gas Company (SCE&G) and Palmetto Electric Cooperative are the major suppliers of power to the town. Hargray provides telephone and broadband services. Waste Management, Inc provides solid waste services.

== Notable people ==
- Gus Dean, NASCAR driver
- Kitty Ferguson, science writer and lecturer
- Bill Workman, former town manager and economic development consultant

== See also ==
- List of municipalities in South Carolina
- South Carolina Lowcountry
- Sun City Hilton Head, planned community near the city
- Bluffton Today, local newspaper headquartered in the city
- The Island Packet, local newspaper headquartered Hilton Head Island

== Works cited ==
- Huffman, Donna. A Guide to Historic Bluffton, 2007. Bluffton Historical Preservation Society, 2007. 80 pp.
- Howie, Stephen S. The Bluffton Charge: One Preacher's Struggle For Civil Rights, 2000. Mammoth Books, 2000. 237 pp.
