= Bluffton Historic District =

Historic district in South Carolina, United States

- U.S. National Register of Historic Places
- U.S. Historic district
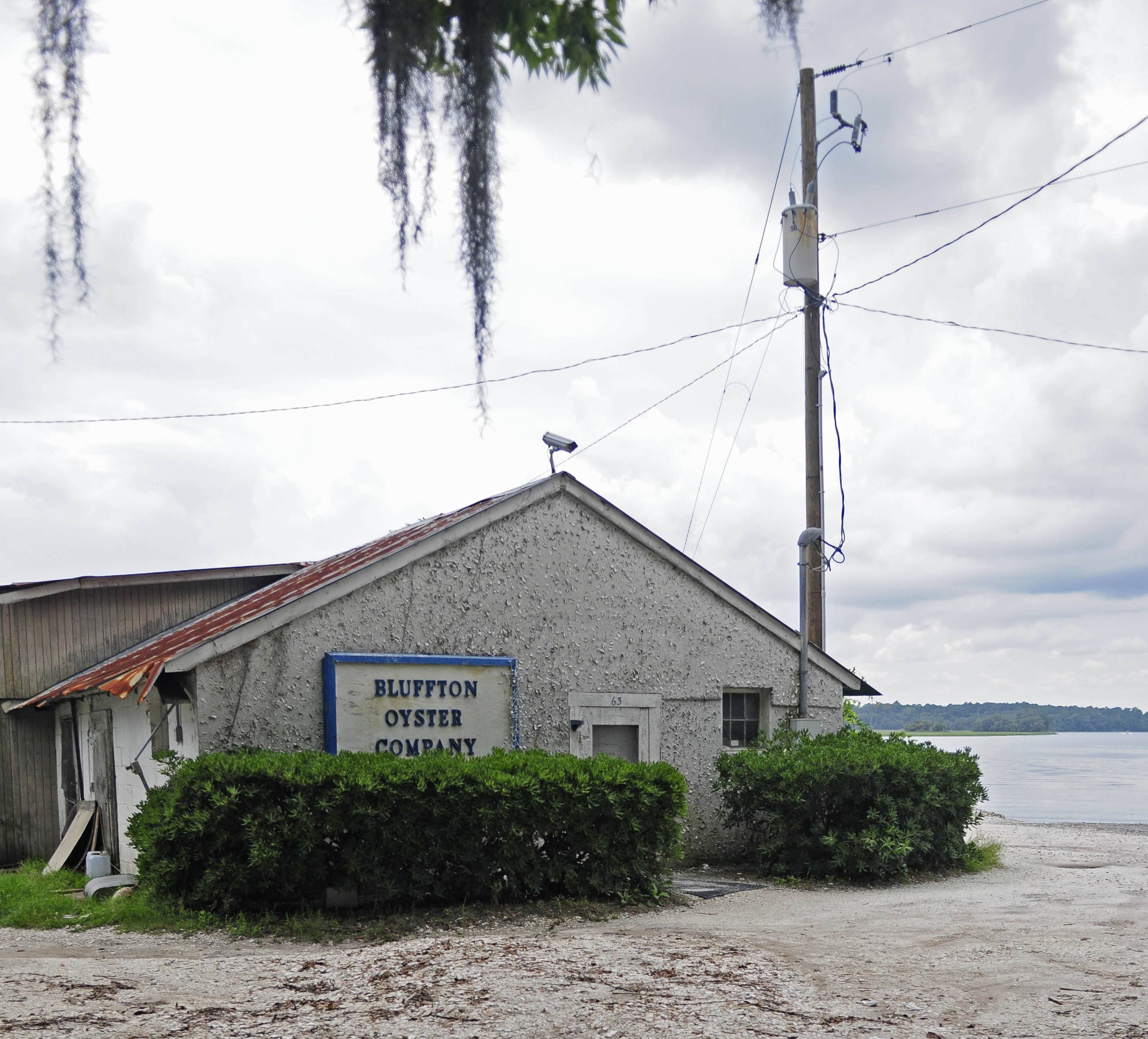
- Bluffton Oyster Company

- Location within South Carolina
- Location: Roughly bounded by the May River, Huger Cove, and Bridge St., Bluffton, South Carolina
- Coordinates: 32°13′57″N 80°51′49″W
- Area: 94.6 acres (38.3 ha)
- Architectural style: Queen Anne, Late 19th And 20th Century Revivals, Late 19th And Early 20th Century American Movements
- NRHP reference No.: 96000686
- Added to NRHP: June 21, 1996

The Bluffton Historic District, located in the town of Bluffton, South Carolina, is important due to its position as the commercial hub of southern Beaufort County from 1880–1930. The area includes 46 buildings of residential and commercial architecture, two landscape features that contribute to the district's historic character, and 17 buildings that do not contribute. Important eras are represented in the district, including the Antebellum Resort Era (1815-1860), Civil War and Reconstruction (1860-1880), and the Commercial Growth and Decline (1880-1945). The Bluffton Historic District was listed in the National Register on June 21, 1996.
