= The Store (Bluffton, South Carolina) =

Coordinates: 32.2343°N 80.8628°W

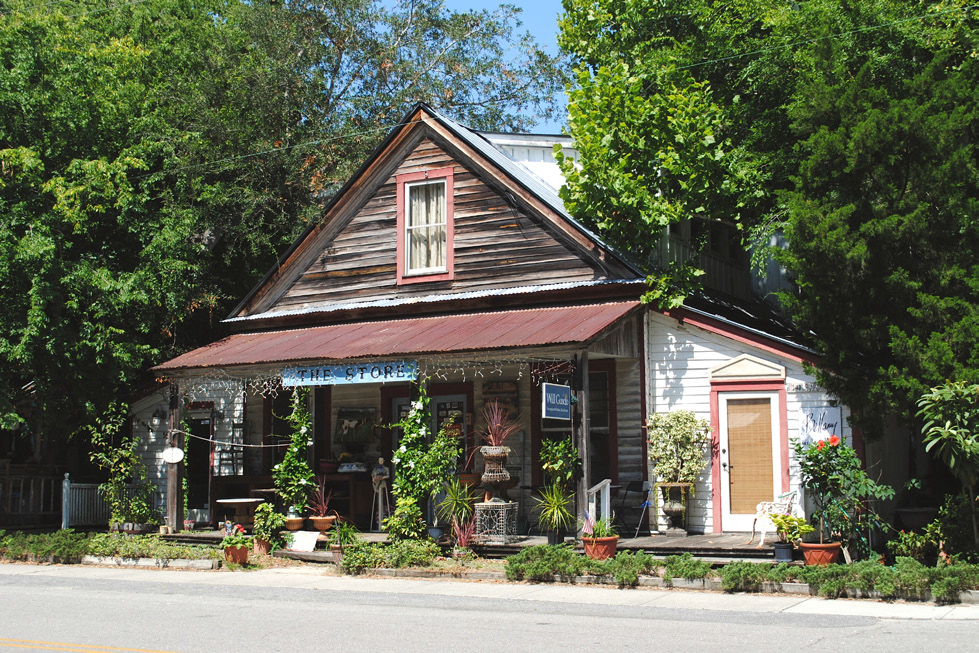
The Store

The Store, is located in Bluffton, South Carolina. It was built in 1904. The Store sits on a large tract of land which is thought to have been the property of Mrs. John Hais Hardee, née Harriet Saussy. She was listed as the "Head of Household" and a "Planter" in both the 1850 and 1860 Census. There are no known records of who owned the property from 1865 to 1900 when it was owned briefly by the Trustees of the School District #2. In 1904, Jesse Davidore Peeples of Scotia, SC bought the property and built a store and a home beside it for his family. He had five children by his first wife, Willie Mae Stokes and ten by his second wife, Maud Estella Guilford. The house contained six bedrooms and a large sleeping porch.

The Store, until the late 1990s was a one-story structure surmounted by a high gable roof and which flanking enclosed side wings with shed roofs. It has been called Peeples Store. The double front doors which have glass panels in the transom, open under a shed roof front porch supported by four square posts.
