= Allen-Lockwood House =

1850 cottage in South Carolina

Coordinates: 32.2319°N 80.8633°W

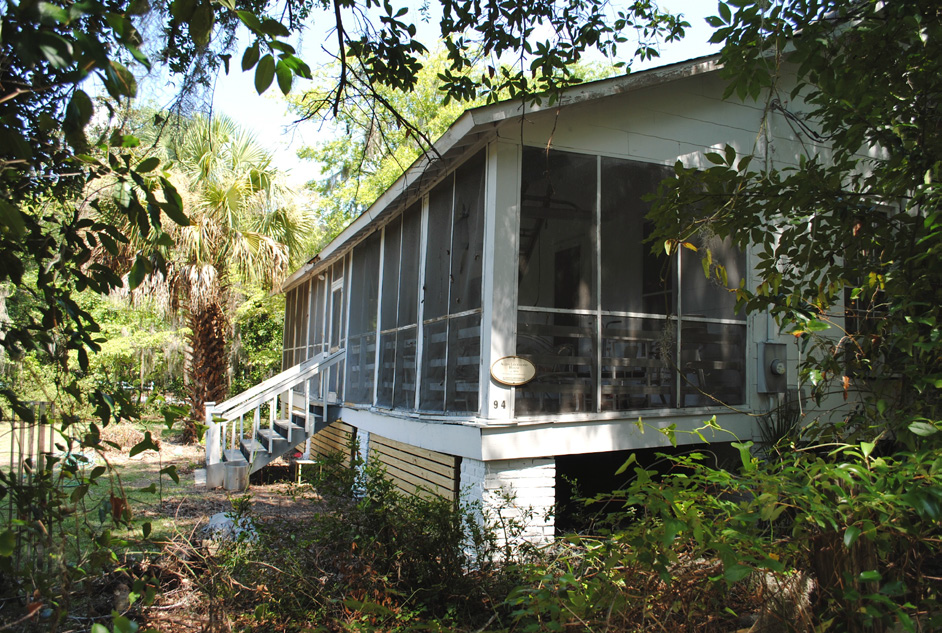
The Allen-Lockwood House

The Allen-Lockwood House is located in Bluffton, South Carolina. It was built in 1850. This cottage was built by William Gaston Allen on the northwest corner of Calhoun and Water Streets for his wife Susan Virginia Bolan and their six children. It is a classic example of the Lowcountry summer cottage with its gabled roof, high-ceiling rooms and numerous windows for cross-ventilation. Raised on brick piers, a wide porch spans the south facade.

Colonel Allen was a planter of the May River Neck area. In 1866, he went bankrupt. At a forced sale in 1873 to his daughter, Susan Virginia (married to a Thomas Postell Lockwood) bought the house for $10. It remained in the Allen-Lockwood family until 1953.
