= Cordray House =

House in Bluffton, South Carolina, US

Coordinates: 32.2370°N 80.8618°W

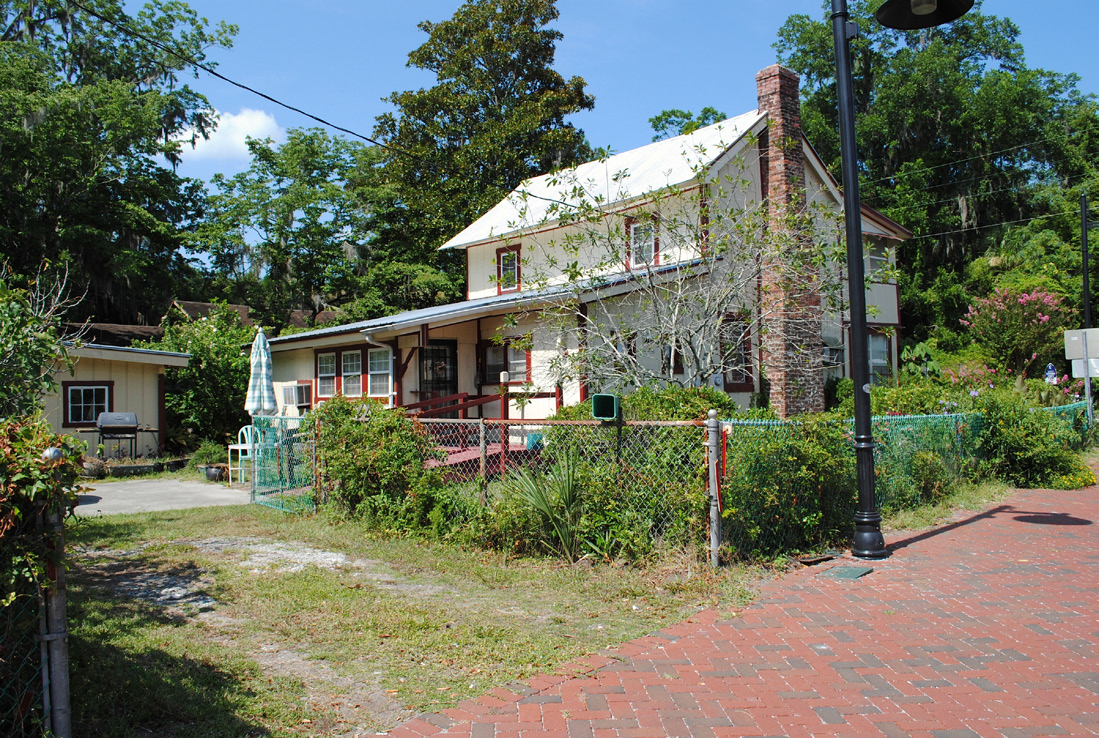
The Cordray House

The Cordray House is located in Bluffton, South Carolina. It was built in 1910.

In the 1860 Census for St. Luke's Parish, one Isaac H. Martin, mason and a free black man, his wife Pauline H. Martin and their children, Philip, Mary E., Isiah and John H were listed. In the Charleston Mercury account of the 1863 Burning of Bluffton, it is stated that the federal troops set fire to the Martin House. The 1913 Plat Map of the Town of Bluffton shows the Martin property had been divided into several lots, including the site of the present Cordray House. Several families have owned parts of this property.

The last remaining Praise House (built to house a new congregation while money was obtained to build a full size church) in the Historic District is behind the Cordray House.

== General references ==
- Huffman, Donna (2007). A Guide To Historic Bluffton. Bluffton Historical Preservation Society. p. 40. ISBN 978-1-60530-375-8.
