= Charlotte Corday (disambiguation) =

Charlotte Corday (1768–1793) assassinated Jean-Paul Marat in the French Revolution.

Charlotte Corday may also refer to:

- Charlotte Corday (painting), an 1860 painting by Paul Baudry
- Charlotte Corday (opera), a 1989 Italian opera
- Charlotte Corday (1919 film), a German silent film
- Operation Charlotte Corday, an assassination attempt against Charles de Gaulle in 1962
