= Christine Corday =

American painter and sculptor (born 1970)

Christine Corday (born in 1970, Fort Meade, Maryland) is an American painter and sculptor. Her work draws from earlier studies in astronomy, cultural anthropology, chemistry, and sensory perception science. Corday's artistic approach consist of manipulation of matter into different states, producing massive sculptures that viewers are meant to experience through touch, leaving memories on the surface of her work. Her works are found in private international collections: Paris, Madrid, Dublin, Tokyo, Los Angeles, San Miguel de Allende, Dubai, Brussels, Washington DC, and New York City. With Corday's first solo exhibition: PROTOIST SERIES: SELECTED FORMS, presented at the Los Angeles County Museum of Art.

== Early life and education ==
A Maryland native, Corday's interest in the arts and science was marked by her classical training in piano during her formative years. In 1991, before receiving her B.A. in Communication Arts (1992), she wrote an original research paper which led to an Astrophysics internship at NASA Ames Research Center. Corday continued her academic studies later on in graduate courses in cultural anthropology at Washington University. From 1992 to 1999, she worked in graphic and structural design for advertising companies, such as Wieden+Kennedy, Bartle Bogle Hegarty, and SKUzzio Design. In 1999 and 2000, Corday began devoting her time to painting. She spent one year in Tokyo, Japan, then would later go to Seville, Spain for three years working on her sound and tidal energy project called Instrument for the Ocean to Play. Corday's work and experiences in Spain shifted her palette to black, hand-making her own tar-like paint through raw pigments, charcoal, and synthetic polymers, and fabricated tools to apply the paint to raw linen and canvas. Corday's black palette painting are considered to be early blueprints of her sculptural work.

== Career ==
In 1992–99, Corday worked internationally for advertising and design agencies as a graphic and structural designer.

=== PROTOIST Series ===
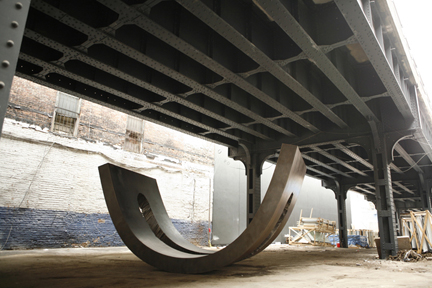
The Form entitled UNE under the New York City High Line at 508 West 25th Street.

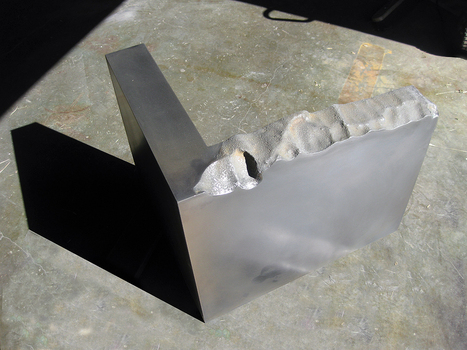
Corday's AHN places at the corner of an exterior or interior architecture.

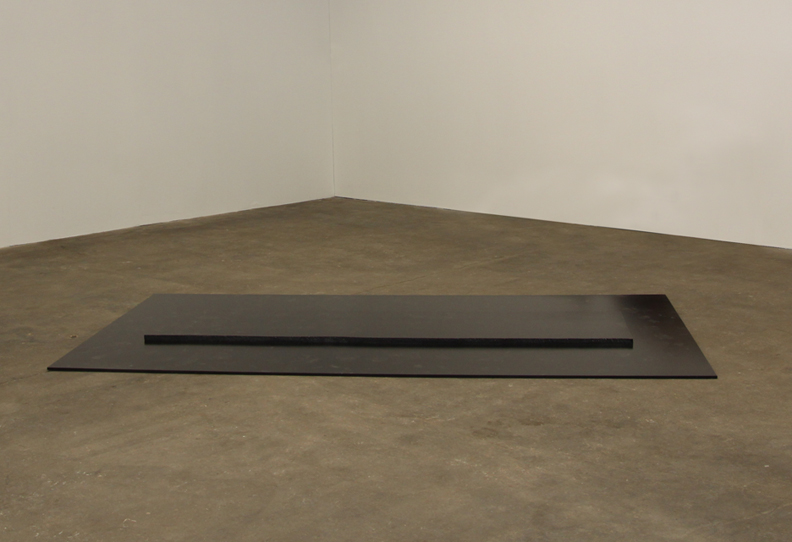
When standing on its touch-cut plateau, ÆPI hones the senses to the most subtle realms shifting perception minutely in a single dimension.

Corday's first steel work entitled UNE is a three-ton form beginning the artist's PROTOIST SERIES. "PROTOIST" is a term coined by the artist to describe the intermediary state between the known and the unknown. UNE is hewn from 3 tons of raw weathering steel, standing nearly 9 feet tall with a 13-inch thick arc spanning more than 16 feet. A 2.5-foot torch-cut void runs through the center of the arc; its resulting passage replaces the artist's hand, or the stroke, in an otherwise mechanical process. UNE began its international tour with a debut exhibition in Chelsea under the High Line, (November 7 – December 12, 2008; Curator: Beverly Allan), the Form "inspired local construction workers to make a three-inch steel effigy, which they gave to the artist as a present; what it will evoke elsewhere is anyone's guess."

The PROTOIST SERIES is conceived and constructed to be consumed by the hand, not only to be touched but to be worn down over time by the tide of human interaction. "Each piece in the PROTOIST SERIES is meant to be touched, to be entered, and even to be walked upon." The Forms are intervened for a sole evening or limited duration in locations—an abandoned interior, an urban alley, a marble piazza—that are selected to motivate the unexpected encounter.

AHN, Corday's second work in the PROTOIST SERIES was installed in the corner of a 5,000 sq ft art space in Greenpoint, Brooklyn: Allan Nederpelt. The 300 pound carbon steel piece supports the juxtaposition of three visible dimensional planes, reminding its experiencer of the intersecting choices constructing reality and the impermanence/permanence of time and place. Art reviewer Enrico Gomez spoke to AHN's "grounding resonance" saying, "It optically strums like an electric bass and has considerable gravitational pull."

In 2011, the 60 in × 120 in (150 cm × 300 cm) maquette of PROTOIST Form ÆPI was previewed during the exhibition, All That Is Unseen, curated by Meg O'Rourke and Caris Reid in New York City. The title of the Form fuses the meaning and pronunciation of the Greek root "epi" (upon) from the English words epicenter and epoch with the lost sound of Latin diphthong Æ. The Form's torch-cut center plate is an abstraction of the figurative self as plateau or stair––standing on its plane shifts a single dimension of perception by 1 and 1/2 inches thus acutely honing the senses to their most subtle realms––a quiet big bang, a floating grounded void, an intimate invitation to the unseen.

Corday has work in private collections in Dubai, Dublin, Mexico City, Madrid, Brussels, and Paris.

Corday's current works include a permanent abstract installation series entitled HELDAN as well as the production of a monumental outdoor form, INSTRUMENT FOR THE OCEAN TO PLAY, that harvests tidal power to create a low-frequency sound.

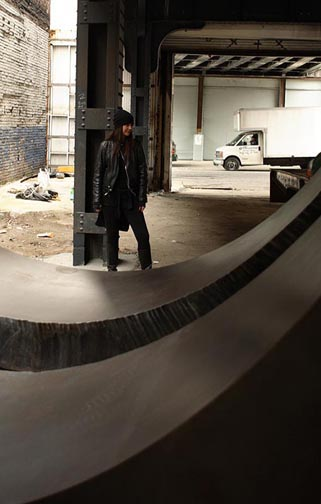
CORDAY at installation of UNE, 2008.

=== Paint ===
In 2000, Corday moved her studio from Tokyo, Japan to Seville, Spain. The years in Spain (2000–2004), Corday's palette was limited to black. Corday created her own paint mulling raw pigment and charcoal into a synthetic polymer base to create a tar-like substance and fabricated tools for its application to raw linen and canvas. Corday moved back to the United States in 2005 to a studio in Greenpoint, Brooklyn, New York. She created a series of painted works as abstract blueprints for the form HELDAN and the PROTOIST Series. In 2009, Corday's painted work entitled THAHLES (72×216 inches) was acquired by the Richard Meier collection installed at 165 Charles Street, New York City, New York. And in 2013, PROME was acquired by the collection of Skidmore, Owings & Merrill's San Francisco office, overseen by Craig W. Hartman.

== National September 11 Memorial ==
As seen in Making the 9/11 Memorial documentary by the History channel and Rising, Rebuilding Ground Zero documentary series by the Discovery Channel, National September 11 Memorial architect Michael Arad selected Corday's black patina for the finish of the bronze name parapets which carry the 2,983 victims names from the September 11 attacks and the 1993 World Trade Center bombing. The bronze name parapets border the edge of the North and South waterfall pools that occupy the former footprints of the North and South Towers.

The selection process for the finish of the bronze was directed by KC Fabrications, an art and architectural fabrication company in Gardiner, New York. KC Fabrications awarded the Bronze Name Parapets through their unique engineering idea in the fabrication and installation of the memorial. "Every name has run under the palm of my hand", Corday said. "Each name here is a life, and that's never been lost on anyone that's worked on this project."

== ITER and the Sans Titre Project ==
Over the last three decades, thirty-five countries have joined to build a sun on Earth––humanity's greatest terrestrial achievement of the celestial. The project is ITER, a 444-acre site in Saint-Paul-lès-Durance, France, dedicated to studying the power of stars through generating one for humankind.

Corday's five-year collaboration with ITER Directors resulted in ‘Art’ as the thirty-sixth and final global contributor with the installation of a single object within the infrastructure of the star. The untitled two-pound work, Sans Titre, now sites in the repeated anonymity of shared material and measurement within ITER's M30 Bolts––in permanent structural responsibility of the mega-heavy forms at the heart of the star: the Tokamak.

“We are the witnessing generation of a star being built on Earth—a human-made sun. As a sculptor my tools are the cosmological-scale hammer and chisel, temperature and pressure, and my materials come from suns. It was important for me that a single work of art be forged on Earth from the metals of stars and placed in support of science re-creating one,” notes Corday of the work Sans Titre.

ITER is an international collaboration between 35 countries to build a nuclear fusion reactor in the South of France, with the goal of investigating whether it's possible to draw on nuclear fusion as a future global energy source. The same nuclear fusion process also takes place in stars. That poetic notion caught the attention of artist Christine Corday. She states, “When I learned that there was a project that was realising a star on Earth, that 35 countries over the last three decades have been devoted to this unprecedented pulse of plasma, I was wholly magnetised.”

ITER will achieve first plasma in 2025 and Sans Titre will quietly observe it all. ITER Director-General Bernard Bigot says “The bolt will be looking down into the fusion process”, he says. “It will be a direct witness when we achieve the first burning plasma.”

Laban Coblentz, Communication Head of ITER notes Sans Titre is Corday's statement of Art's shared material support of "science's greatest terrestrial achievement of the celestial." With Art, not as decoration, but as a contributing and sustained presence.

On July 28, 2020, French President Emmanuel Macron hosted world dignitaries from Germany, European Commission, China, India, Japan, Korea, Russia, and United States in celebration of the collaborative achievement with start of ITER Tokamak assembly.

== United Nations Keynote Address ==
On October 28, 2024, Christine Corday was an invited keynote address at the 2024 Flagship Conference: Carbon-Free Cities: Climate Action in the Built Environment at the United Nations Headquarters in New York. Corday addressed the delegation, member states, and invited industry experts on her Foundation Civilization projects. The half-day event was co-organized by the Consortium for Sustainable Urbanization and UN Habitat.

== Awards and prizes ==
Corday was awarded a 2019 National Endowment for the Arts grant for the solo exhibition, Relative Points at the Contemporary Art Museum St. Louis. She was also honored as the 2019 recipient of the Pollock-Krasner Foundation Brian Wall Foundation grant for sculptors. In 2016, Corday was a nominee for the United States Artists fellow. Corday received the Edison Ingenuity Prize in Montreal, Canada, and has also won a number of international design awards for her patented glass bottle for The Republic of Tea. In 2000, Corday was selected for a short story prize from Francis Ford Coppola's fiction magazine Zoetrope.

== Personal life ==
Between 1996 and 2005, she lived and worked in Portland, Oregon; San Francisco, and Los Angeles, California; Tokyo, Japan; and Seville, Spain. During this time, Corday's work evolved solely in the fine arts, specifically into form such as sculpture and architecture.

Corday lives in New York.
