= Jorge Cordero (musician) =

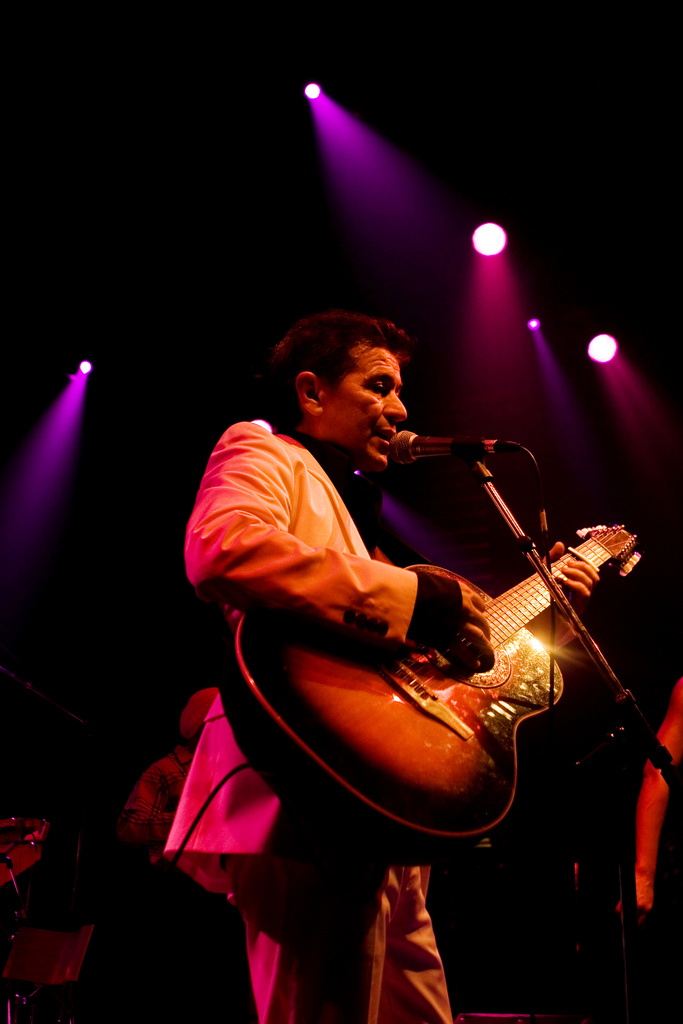
- Cordero with his guitar

Background information
- Born: Jorge Luis Jomarron Cordero; May 12, 1952; Holguín, Cuba
- Genres: Salsa; Son
- Occupations: Singer-songwriter; Music teacher
- Instruments: Vocals; guitar; drums
- Years active: 1970–present

Jorge Luis Jomarron Cordero (born, May 12, 1952) is a Cuban singer, guitarist and percussionist, known by his artistic name of Jorge Cordero.

== Bio ==
Born May 12, 1952 in Holguín, Cuba, resident of Denmark since 1969, Cordero, who also is a music teacher, has attended the Instituto Superior De Arte de la Habana taking several music courses and is in a musical ambient since the last 4 decades, where he has been immersed in rhythms such as Pop, Latinrock and Salsa. From 1970 and 1975 Jorge Cordero appeared as percussionist in the Anne Linnet and Steffen Brandt ensembles. 1975 saw him appear as guitarist in the Latin Rock band, La Luna, with whom he recorded their "Que Vida" single.

In 1979 Jorge Cordero joins the Denmark-based salsa orchestra, Salsa Na´ Ma, as tres (Cuban guitar) player and vocalist. He stayed active with this band (under the directorship of Danish percussionist Birger Sulsbrück) until 1987, the year well he embarked on a solo career in his own orchestra, Los Gran Daneses.

Cordero and his Los Gran Daneses went on to appear in Miami's prestigious Calle Ocho Festival in 1992, then in 1993 they recorded their debut album, Rompiendo El Hielo with the TTH label. This recording gave this orchestra worldwide recognition among the international salsa community. The title track from this record was included in Salsa Europe compilation. 1996 saw the release of Los Gran Daneses', Del Norte y Tropical album which contained a memorable version of Ernesto Duarte's bolero, Como Fue. The band gained further recognition with their 1999 release Al Tiempo, which won them a prize in the Danish Music Awards.

Cordero's fourth reléase Salsa Global (2001) was recorded both in Copenhagen and Miami and counted with the participation of salsa stars such as Alex Leon, Domingo Quiñones and Nino Segarra. The band's fifth and sixth album releases were Latino (Worldbeat Records) and Reflexiones (In the House Records), recorded in 2004 and 2008 respectively. The year 2009 sees Jorge Cordero joining his pianist son, Mick Cordero and percussionist Yannik "Vikingo" Hartig to form the Son Clasico trio, a group dedicated to educational concerts. Their debut album, Cubano was released in 2013.

A few years earlier in 2010, this Cuban musician from Holguín had distinguished himself as the Danish act with the most foreign presentations, including concerts in Spain, USA, Germany, Poland, Finland, Cuba, Italy, Sweden and Norway. In 2011 the Gran Daneses record their seventh album, Siempre Pa´ Lante, with guest artists including Alain Pérez, Luisito Quintero and Nelson Jaime Gazú. Cordero's most recent production and eighth release, Mi Universo enjoys the participation of Spanish arranger, Moise Gonzalez.

== Discography ==
- Rompiendo El Hielo (1993)
- Del Norte y Tropical (1996)
- Al Tiempo (1999)
- Salsa Global (2001)
- Latino (2004)
- Reflexiones (2008)
- Siempre Pa´ Lante (2011)
- Son Clasico (2013)
- Mi Universo (2016)

== Collaborations ==
- Salsa Na Ma (Salsa Na`Ma)
- Differente (Salsa Na`Ma)
- Que Vida (Luna)

== Awards ==
- 1999 Danish World Music Awards
- 2002 Danish World Music Awards
- 2004 Danish World Music Awards
